= 2025 in paleomammalogy =

This article records new taxa of fossil mammals of every kind that have been described during the year 2025, as well as other significant discoveries and events related to paleontology of mammals that have occurred in 2025.

== Afrotherians ==
=== Proboscideans ===
Name	Novelty	Status	Authors	Age	Type locality	Location	Notes	Image
Saegusaia	Gen. et comb. nov	Valid	Wang et al.	Miocene	Hujiagou	China	A member of the Amebelodontidae. The type species is "Protanancus" brevirostris; genus also contains "P." wimani.	

==== Proboscidean research ====
- Ahmed & Khan (2025) describe new proboscidean fossil material from the Miocene Chinji Formation (Pakistan), including fossils of members of the genera Prodeinotherium, Gomphotherium and Protanancus (the first record of the lower tusk of an adult individual belonging to this genus reported from the Siwalik Group).
- Saarinen et al. (2025) identify proboscidean fossil material from the Miocene strata from the Hayranlı-Haliminhanı locality (Turkey) as remains of a mastodon belonging or related to the species "Mammut" obliquelophus, and interpret it as supporting the affinities of late Miocene Eurasian mammutids with the genus Mammut.
- The first fossil material of "Mammut" borsoni from Turkey is reported from the Pliocene Ahmetçik Formation by Albayrak, Antoine & Çörekçioğlu (2025), found in association with remains of the rhinocerotid Pliorhinus megarhinus.
- Dooley et al. (2025) reevaluate the affinities of mastodon fossil material from Oregon and Washington (United States), Alberta (Canada) and Hidalgo and Jalisco (Mexico), extending known geographical range of Mammut pacificus, and providing probable evidence of presence of both M. pacificus and M. americanum in close geographical proximity.
- Karpinski et al. (2025) sequence mitochondrial genomes of the Pacific mastodon from Tualatin (Oregon, United States) and six American mastodons from eastern North America, and report evidence of deep divergence of the Tualatin mastodon (and likely other Pacific mastodons) relative to other mastodons, evidence that the range of Pacific mastodons extended beyond the contiguous United States and into Alberta (Canada), and evidence of at least three different episodes of expansion of American mastodons into northeastern coastal areas of North America during the Middle and Late Pleistocene.
- Jukar, Millhouse & Carrano (2025) revise the fossil material attributed to Amebelodon floridanus, assign a neotype specimen of this species and support its placement in the genus Amebelodon; their arguments are contested by Lambert (2025), who reaffirms the validity of the separate genus established for A. floridanus, Stenobelodon.
- Luna et al. (2025) study mandibular lesions in two specimens of Notiomastodon platensis from the Pleistocene strata from Argentina, and diagnose both individuals as affected by secondary chronic osteomyelitis of the mandible.
- Mothé et al. (2025) determine the age of remains of Notiomastodon platensis from Córdoba Province (Argentina), providing evidence of presence of the species in the studied area from Ensenadan to Lujanian.
- González-Guarda et al. (2025) report evidence of frugivory of Notiomastodon platensis, and argue that the studied proboscidean may have acted as a seed disperser and its extinction may have increased the extinction risk of plants whose seeds it used to disperse.
- Cruz, Faurby & Sawaya (2025) identify climatically suitable areas for Cuvieronius hyodon and Notiomastodon platensis in South America during major climatic events of the Quaternary, reporting evidence that climate changes contributed to fragmentation of habitats suitable for the studied species but did not result in the complete disappearance of those habitats, indicating that climate changes were not the primary driver of extinction of South American gomphotheres.
- Sankhyan, Abbas & Sehgal (2025) describe fossil material of Stegodon sp. from the Pliocene strata of the Tatrot Formation, representing the first confirmed record a member of this genus from Himachal Pradesh (India).
- Tablizo, van den Bergh & Fernando (2025) describe a partial skull of a member of the genus Stegodon from the Pleistocene strata of the Awidon Mesa Formation from Luzon, representing the first formally described Stegodon skull from the Philippines, and interpret the studied fossil as supporting island-hopping dispersal of Stegodon across the Philippines and Wallacea.
- A tooth of a member of the genus Stegodon with anatomy distinct from Stegodon orientalis and S. trigonocephalus is described from the Pleistocene strata in the state of Perak (Malaysia) by Amiruddin et al. (2025), representing the southernmost known record of Stegodon in continental Asia.
- Evidence from the study of carbon and oxygen isotope values of tooth enamel of Palaeoloxodon from Early and Middle Pleistocene localities in the Afar Rift (Ethiopia), indicative of dietary flexibility of members of the "Palaeoloxodon recki complex", is presented by Luyt, Sahle & Stynder (2025).
- Evidence of diets of Palaeoloxodon naumanni and mammoths from the Pleistocene sites in Japan, including possible evidence of different foraging behaviors of the studied proboscideans in Hokkaido, is presented by Naito (2025).
- A study on the affinities of Palaeoloxodon naumanni, as indicated by ancient mitochondrial DNA, is published by Segawa et al. (2025), who recover P. naumanni as a member of an early-diverging lineage within Eurasian Palaeoloxodon that survived until the Late Pleistocene, avoiding replacement by Palaeoloxodon namadicus because of geographical isolation in the Japanese islands.
- A study on the diets of the straight-tusked elephants and mammoths from the Pliocene and Pleistocene strata of the Ptolemais Basin, Mygdonia Basin, Drama Basin and the Neapolis-Grevena Basin (Greece) is published by Tsakalidis et al. (2025).
- A study on tooth wear patterns in Palaeoloxodon falconeri and Palaeoloxodon mnaidriensis is published by Strani et al. (2025), who report evidence of similar adaptations to feeding on abrasive plants in both species in response to different ecological conditions.
- Basilia et al. (2025) compare rib histology in Palaeoloxodon creutzburgi from Crete and in the straight-tusked elephant from mainland Greece, and report evidence of bone metabolic adaptation to the reduction of body mass in P. creutzburgi.
- Evidence from the study of carbon and oxygen isotope composition of tooth enamel of specimens of Palaeoloxodon from Pleistocene localities in Taiwan, indicative of reliance on C_{4} plants and running water sources, is presented by Biswas et al. (2025), who also report probable evidence of weaning in a juvenile specimen.
- A study on molars of Elephas recki from the Shungura Formation (Ethiopia) is published by Bedane, Mackaye & Boisserie (2025), who report evidence of stepwise rather than gradual changes in dental morphology, as well as evidence of a consistent diet throughout the evolution of the studied proboscidean, with no evidence of a correlation between changes of morphology and feeding preferences.
- Evidence from the study of remains of Mammuthus meridionalis from the Pleistocene strata from localities in the Barranc de la Boella complex (Spain), indicating that the studied mammoths were feeding in open environments dominated by C_{3} grasslands, and indicative of a spatial relationship between faunal remains and stone tools in the level II.2 of Pit 1 within the Barranc de la Boella ravine (consistent with the interpretation of this aggregation as resulting from butchering of the mammoth carcass), is presented by Fidalgo et al. (2025).
- A study on the evolutionary history of mammoths during the last million years, based on data from mitogenomes (including 34 newly reported ones), is published by Chacón-Duque et al. (2025).
- Description of the cranial morphology of Mammuthus meridionalis and its variation is published by Ferretti, Bellucci & Rustioni (2025).
- Ros-Montoya et al. (2025) revise the mammoth fossil material from the Dmanisi site (Georgia), and support its attribution to the species Mammuthus meridionalis.
- Krivokorin et al. (2025) study the carbon and nitrogen isotopic composition of woolly mammoth remains from the Late Pleistocene strata from the Shestakovo, Krasnoyarskaya Kurya, and Volchia Griva sites in the Western Siberian Plain (Russia), and report evidence of unusually high nitrogen isotopic values, interpreted as likely related to local environmental conditions that affected nitrogen cycling.
- A study on the possible age and nitrogen isotopic composition of a probable woolly mammoth molar from the Long Island (Nunavut, Canada) is published by Bateman & Larsson (2025).
- A study on mammoth teeth from the Pleistocene strata in Alberta (Canada), providing evidence of presence of three morphotypes – including a morphotype intermediate between the woolly mammoth and the Columbian mammoth – is published by Barrón-Ortiz, Jass & Cammidge (2025).
- A study on the dietary habits of Columbian mammoths from the Tultepec I and Tultpec II sites (Mexico), providing evidence of mixed C_{3}/C_{4} diet for the majority of the studied specimens, is published by Rodríiguez-Franco et al. (2025).
- Arrieta-Donato et al. (2025) recover 61 mitochondrial genomes of Columbian mammoths from central Mexico, providing evidence of presence of a lineage with a demographic history that differed from other North American mammoth lineages at the mitochondrial level, and formed a clade outside of the genetic variation of mammoths from Canada and the United States; the authors also report evidence of a static demographic trajectory for the studied mammoths, and find no evidence of a drastic bottlenecking at the end of the Pleistocene, as well as no evidence of an unequal proportion of males to females.
- Gardner, Jass & Hutchinson (2025) identify a probable distal prehallux and a fused sesamoid pair from the digits in Columbian mammoth specimens from the Mammoth Site of Hot Springs (South Dakota, United States), representing the first records of these elements reported in extinct elephantids.
- Evidence from the study of microbial DNA from mammoth remains spanning over 1 million years, indicative of presence of host-associated microbes related to extant members of the genera Actinobacillus, Erysipelothrix, Streptococcus and Pasteurella (including relatives of extant bacteria linked to the deaths of African elephants), is presented by Guinet et al. (2025).
- Evidence from genomic analysis of two mammoth molars from British Columbia (Canada), indicative of recurrent hybridization between Columbian and woolly mammoths resulting in an increased admixture signal over time (that would have gone undiscovered in the studies focusing on morphology and mitochondrial diversity), is presented by Dehasque et al. (2025).
- Mármol-Sánchez et al. (2025) report ancient RNA profiles from 10 Late Pleistocene woolly mammoths from northeastern Siberia (Russia), including the oldest preserved transcriptional signatures reported to date.
- Purported mammoth vertebra from the Holocene strata from interior Alaska with the youngest reported radiocarbon ages associated with mammoth specimens are reinterpreted as whale bones by Wooller et al. (2025).
- Belyaev & Prilepskaya (2025) compare morphology and intervertebral mobility of the vertebral column of extant elephants, steppe mammoths, woolly mammoths and American mastodons.
- Ruiz et al. (2025) estimate the maximum speed capabilities of Mammuthus primigenius, Mammut americanum, Mammuthus columbi, Deinotherium proavum, Mammuthus trogontherii, Mammuthus meridionalis, Palaeoloxodon antiquus and Mammut borsoni.

=== Sirenians ===
Name	Novelty	Status	Authors	Age	Type locality	Country	Notes	Images
Salwasiren	Gen. et sp. nov	Valid	Pyenson et al.	Miocene (Aquitanian)	Dam Formation	Qatar	A member of the family Dugongidae. The type species is S. qatarensis.	

==== Sirenian research ====
- Veress, Codrea & Venczel (2025) review the fossil material of Paleogene sirenians from Romania, and describe indeterminate sirenian material from the Oligocene strata from a new locality at Bizușa in the Sălaj County.
- Ducrocq et al. (2025) report the discovery of fossil material (including a well-preserved and almost complete skull) of a specimen of Metaxytherium medium from the Miocene strata in France, and estimate body size of the studied specimen.

=== Other afrotherians ===
==== Miscellaneous afrotherian research ====
- Crespo & Castillo (2025) reject the arguments of Furió, Minwer-Barakat & García-Alix (2024), who considered the fossil material of Europotamogale melkarti to be remains of a water-mole of the genus Archaeodesmana, and reaffirm the validity of E. melkarti.
- New information on the skull anatomy of Postschizotherium, based on the study of a nearly complete skull from the Pleistocene strata from the Longdan locality (China), is provided by Xing et al. (2025).
- Gheerbrant, Billet & Pickford (2025) describe new fossil material of Namatherium blackcrowense from the Eocene strata from the Black Crow site (Namibia), providing new information on the anatomy of the studied embrithopod.

== Euarchontoglires ==
=== Primates ===
Name	Novelty	Status	Authors	Age	Type locality	Country	Notes	Images
Algeripithecus minimissimus	Sp. nov		Marivaux in Marivaux et al.	Eocene		Tunisia	A member of the family Azibiidae.	
Azibius magnus	Sp. nov		Marivaux in Marivaux et al.	Eocene		Algeria	A member of the family Azibiidae.	
Lazibadapis	Gen. et sp. nov		Marivaux in Marivaux et al.	Eocene		Algeria	A possible member of the family Djebelemuridae. The type species is L. anchomomyinopsis.	
Pongo grovesei	Sp. nov		Cameron et al.	Pleistocene		Vietnam	An orangutan.	
Pongo nguyenbinheri	Sp. nov		Cameron et al.	Pleistocene		Vietnam	An orangutan.	

==== Primate research ====
- Avaria-Llautureo et al. (2025) interpret the areas of northern continents with variable but nontropical climates as the most likely ancestral locations for the crown group of primates, which only colonized tropical areas later in their evolutionary history.
- Evidence from the study of brain endocasts of extant and extinct mammals, indicative of cortical expansion in the areas of the brain involved in producing cognitive functions that began early on during the primate evolution, is presented by Melchionna et al. (2025), who argue that selection for complex cognition likely drove the evolution of primate brains.
- Lang et al. (2025) study the size of the olfactory bulbs in extant and fossil members of Euarchontoglires, and report evidence of a reduction of the olfactory bulb size at the base of the primate crown group, as well as subsequent reductions in different primate groups.
- A study on the diversity of craniofacial morphology of extant and extinct primates from Madagascar, providing evidence of similarity of cranial shapes in smaller taxa and more diverse cranial morphologies in larger taxa such as Megaladapis, is published by Toyoda (2025).
- Thompson et al. (2025) provide new estimates of body mass for 10 species of extinct lemurs.
- Evidence from the study of size of brain and its components in extant primates and Oligocene and Miocene simians, interpreted as indicative of convergent brain enlargement in multiple simian lineages and of shifts in brain proportions before brain enlargement in simians, is presented by Kay et al. (2025).
- Evidence from the study of extant and fossil primates, providing evidence of a significant association between brain size and manual dexterity throughout the evolutionary history of primates, is presented by Baker, Barton & Venditti (2025).
- Kirk et al. (2025) describe a primate frontal bone from the Eocene Devil's Graveyard Formation (Texas, United States), with similarities to the frontal bone of Rooneyia viejaensis, and interpret its anatomy as indicating that both the studied specimen and Rooneyia as more likely to be stem haplorhines than stem simians.
- Evidence from the study of the anatomy of manubria and sternebrae of extant and fossil simians, indicating that the anatomy of the sternum can provide information on the form of the thorax and the positional repertoire of the clavicles in fossil simians, is presented by Middleton, Alwell & Ward (2025).
- Novo et al. (2025) study the phylogenetic affinities of Soriacebus and Mazzonicebus, and interpret them as more likely to be pitheciines than stem-platyrrhines.
- Perry et al. (2025) describe new fossil material of Homunculus patagonicus from the Miocene Santa Cruz Formation (Argentina), provide new body mass estimates for the studied species, and interpret H. patagonicus as an arboreal primate with a mixed diet of fruits and leaves.
- A study on tooth wear and probable diets of Miocene and Pliocene Old World monkeys from the Turkana Basin (Kenya) is published by Fehringer et al. (2025).
- A study on the phylogenetic relationships of extant and fossil members of Colobinae is published by Arenson (2025).
- Pallas et al. (2025) revise elbow anatomy and locomotor adaptations of Microcolobus on the basis of the study of known fossils and new specimens from the Miocene Nakali Formation (Kenya), reporting evidence of arboreal adaptations, and evidence that elbow anatomy of Microcolobus can be distinguished from those of Cercopithecoides bruneti and Paracolobus enkorikae.
- Brasil et al. (2025) revise the species-level taxonomy of South African Parapapio, and argue that the available evidence does not support assignment of the studied fossil material to more than one species.
- The oldest known adult femora of Theropithecus cf. oswaldi darti and Theropithecus cf. oswaldi oswaldi, providing evidence of early appearance of anatomical adaptations to squatting behavior in the Theropithecus lineage, are described from the Afar Depression (Ethiopia) by Pallas et al. (2025) .
- A study on the diet of Theropithecus atlanticus from the Plio-Pleistocene site of Ahl al Oughlam (Morocco), as indicated by tooth wear, is published by Louail et al. (2025).
- A mandible of an indeterminate primate (either an ape or, more likely, a member of Pliopithecoidea) comparable in size with small gibbons is described from the Miocene strata from Moghara (Egypt) by Pickford & AbdelGawad (2025), expanding known diversity of primates from Moghara.
- A study on the ulnar morphology of Pliobates cataloniae, providing evidence of an extensive range of movement in the forearm, is published by Raventós-Izard et al. (2025).
- Bouchet et al. (2025) identify fossil material of a purported pliopithecid from the Miocene strata from the Trinxera del Ferrocarril-Sant Quirze site and a purported crouzeliid from the Can Feliu 2 site (Vallès-Penedès Basin; Spain) as likely belonging to a single, medium-sized crouzeliid species belonging to the subfamily Anapithecinae.
- Description of the anatomy of the skull and teeth of Laccopithecus robustus and a study on its affinities is published by Harrison (2025).
- Ungar, Wilcox & Begun (2025) compare tooth wear in primates from the Miocene site Rudabánya (Hungary), and report evidence indicating that the studied individuals of Rudapithecus hungaricus on average consumed harder foods than individuals of Anapithecus hernyaki.
- Beaudet et al. (2025) study the morphology of the atlas of Otavipithecus namibiensis and Nacholapithecus kerioi, and report evidence of similarities with the vertebrae of baboons, gibbons and members of the genus Pan, with Otavipithecus similar in particular to Pan in the overall morphology of the atlas.
- Kithinji, Kikuchi & Nakatsukasa (2025) describe a catarrhine talus from the Miocene strata from the Nachola site (Kenya), likely belonging to a member of the genus Nyanzapithecus, and interpret its anatomy as indicating that Nyanzapithecus was less agile while walking and running in the trees than extant Old World monkeys of similar size.
- Pugh, Strain & Gilbert (2025) study the anatomy of teeth of Samburupithecus kiptalami and interpret it as a late-occurring African member of the family Oreopithecidae.
- A study on the morphology of the lumbar vertebrae of Ekembo nyanzae, Morotopithecus bishopi and Pierolapithecus catalaunicus, and on its implications for the knowledge of the locomotion of the studied apes, is published by Williams et al. (2025).
- Revision of the fossil material and species differences of members of the genus Ekembo is published by McNulty, Begun & Kelley (2025).
- A study on the morphology and affinities of Kapi ramnagarensis is published by Gilbert et al. (2025), who interpret the studied primate as a stem-hylobatid.
- Radović et al. (2025) describe a molar of an indeterminate member of Graecopithecini from the vicinity of Veles, representing the first late Miocene hominid reported from North Macedonia.
- A study on the tooth wear of Lufengpithecus lufengensis, providing evidence of a diet that included tough foods such as leaves, is published by Fan et al. (2025).
- Li et al. (2025) determine hominoid-bearing strata of the Yuanmou Basin (Yunnan, China) to be approximately 7.7 million years old on the basis of dating of carbonate crystals within hyena coprolites, report palynological evidence of presence of a diverse vegetation growing in a subtropical humid climate, and interpret the studied area a preserving favorable environmental conditions for hominoids such as Lufengpithecus during the late Miocene, unlike other parts of Eurasia where hominoids declined at that time.
- Evidence from the study of faciodental remains of pongines from northern Vietnam, interpreted as consistent with the presence of two large and two small species of orangutans during the Late Pleistocene, is presented by Cameron et al. (2025); in a subsequent study the same authors revise the diversity of the Middle and Late Pleistocene pongines from northern Vietnam on the basis of variability of post-canine teeth, recognize two new species of Pongo from the Late Pleistocene of Làng Tráng and Kéo Lèng caves, and reclassify "Pongo" hooijeri and "Pongo pygmaeus" kahlkei as species belonging to the genus Langsonia, interpreted as a primitive member of the Ponginae.
- Evidence from the study of fossil hominid teeth and from experiments with human brain organoids, indicative of exposure of hominids to lead over 2 million years and its possible impact on evolution of human social and behavioral functioning, is presented by Joannes-Boyau et al. (2025).

==== General paleoanthropology ====
- Sekhavati, Prang & Strait (2025) study the evolution of foot morphology in early hominins, and interpret their findings as supporting the hypothesis of a Pan-like chimpanzee–human last common ancestor.
- Casado et al. (2025) compare ligament insertion sites on the radius in extant humans and apes and fossil hominins, and interpret them as indicative of diverse locomotor behaviors in fossil hominins, including arboreal locomotion in Australopithecus and Paranthropus.
- Steer et al. (2025) compare the scaphoid morphology in extant humans and African apes and fossil hominins, and report evidence of morphological differences between scaphoids of different hominin taxa which might be related to diverse functional pressures acting upon their wrists.
- Mateos et al. (2025) revise the assumptions made in archaeology and paleoanthropology about hominin scavenging, argue that scavenging is part of the foraging repertoire of all hominin species and population, and argue that scavenging and hunting by hominins were not mutually exclusive.
- Marchal, Reed & Prat (2025) review the stratigraphic and taxonomic distribution and history of discovery and publication of hominin fossils from the Omo-Turkana Basin.
- Evidence of adaptations to vertical climbing in the talus of Ardipithecus ramidus similar to those seen in gorillas and chimpanzees is presented by Prang et al. (2025), who interpret their findings as consistent with evolution of the human lineage from an African ape-like ancestor rather than from a generalized arboreal ape-like ancestor.
- Braga, Alemseged & Gilissen (2025) compare the relationships between endocranial and facial growth, dental development and basicranial morphology in African apes, extant humans and extinct hominins, reporting evidence of developmental differences during early ontogeny in fossil hominins.
- Lawrence, Hammond & Ward (2025) compare the orientation of the acetabulum in fossil hominins and extant primates, reporting evidence of humanlike condition in early Australopithecus.
- Evidence from the study of nitrogen and carbonate carbon isotope composition of tooth enamel of Australopithecus from the Sterkfontein Member 4 (South Africa), interpreted as indicating that the studied specimens had a plant-based diet and did not regularly eat mammalian meat, is presented by Lüdecke et al. (2025).
- Madupe et al. (2025) provide evidence of protein preservation in tooth enamel of the Australopithecus africanus specimen Sts 63 from Sterkfontein Member 4, and identify the studied individual as a male.
- Martin et al. (2025) argue that the morphology of the Little Foot specimen does not support its referral to the species Australopithecus prometheus, and consider A. prometheus to be most likely a junior synonym of Australopithecus africanus.
- Evidence from the study of internal bone structure of phalanx bones of Australopithecus sediba and Homo naledi, interpreted as indicative of different dexterous abilities and climbing strategies of the studied hominins, is presented by Syeda et al. (2025).
- A study on the surface organization of the endocast of the Taung Child is published by Hurst et al. (2025).
- Haile-Selassie et al. (2025) describe new fossil material of Australopithecus deyiremeda from Burtele (Ethiopia), assign the foot described by Haile-Selassie et al. (2012) to the same species, and report that A. deyiremeda had a more primitive dental and postcranial morphology than Australopithecus afarensis, that its feet had greater ability for grasping than modern most fossil hominins, and that it had a diet dominated by C_{3} foods, similar to the earlier Australopithecus anamensis.
- Evidence of morphological variation among maxillae of specimens of Australopithecus afarensis from Hadar (Ethiopia), possibly linked to sexual dimorphism, is presented by Hanegraef & Spoor (2025).
- A study on curvature of occipital condyles of Australopithecus afarensis and extant hominins, providing evidence that A. afarensis was Pan-like in condylar morphology and development, is published by Grider-Potter et al. (2025).
- Evidence from the study of clavicles of Australopithecus afarensis, interpreted as consistent with continued arboreal behavior throughout life of the studied hominin, is presented by Farrell & Alemseged (2025).
- Hanegraef, David & Spoor (2025) determine the range of variation of size and shape of dental arcades of Australopithecus afarensis, and argue that their findings can be used to assess whether other Plio-Pleistocene hominin specimens fall within the range of variation of A. afarensis, helping with their taxonomic interpretations.
- New fossil material of Australopithecus afarensis, providing new information on the morphological variation of members of this species, is described from the Upper Laetolil Beds (Tanzania) by Harrison, Rein & Kwekason (2025).
- Evidence of more significant sexual dimorphism in Australopithecus afarensis and A. africanus compared to chimpanzees and modern humans is presented by Gordon (2025).
- A study on the inner structural morphology of teeth of Australopithecus sediba, providing evidence of closer similarity to teeth of other members of the genus Australopithecus than to teeth of early members of the genus Homo, is published by Davies (2025).
- Zanolli et al. (2025) study the anatomy and affinities of the Pleistocene hominin mandible SK 15 from Swartkrans Member 2, South Africa (the holotype of Telanthropus capensis), and interpret this specimen as belonging to a previously unrecognized species of Paranthropus, P. capensis.
- Mongle et al. (2025) describe hand and foot bones of Paranthropus boisei from Koobi Fora (Kenya), providing evidence that hands of P. boisei were likely capable of grips similar to those of modern humans but also that they likely differed in habitual thumb use, and report evidence of morphological similarities in the hand morphology of P. boisei and modern gorillas, possibly related to use of hand in processing of plants for food.
- Evidence indicating that derived skull morphology of Paranthropus boisei might have resulted in a reduction of its capacity for morphological evolution toward new adaptive peaks is presented by Jung et al. (2025).
- A study on the morphology of the oval window in Paranthropus robustus, interpreted as spanning the ape-human spectrum, is published by Fernandez & Braga (2025).
- Fossil material of a young adult hominin specimen, including a complete tibia and a nearly complete femur articulating with a partial hip bone, is described from the Hanging Remnant of the Swartkrans Formation (South Africa) by Pickering et al. (2025), who assign the studied individual to the species Paranthropus robustus.
- Madupe et al. (2025) identify sex of four specimens of Paranthropus robustus on the basis of their enamel peptides, and report probable evidence of existence of distinct subgroups within this species.
- Sillen, Dean & Balter (2025) reconstruct life histories of individuals of Paranthropus robustus from Swartkrans and Kromdraai (South Africa) on the basis of the analysis of strontium isotope composition of their teeth, and report evidence of exploitation of both savanna and riparian woodlands, as well as evidence of dispersal and lifelong local residence of different individuals.
- Evidence from the study of paleosols from the hominin and archaeological sites from the Gona Paleoanthropological Project area (Ethiopia) ranging from the Oldowan to the Late Stone Age, interpreted as indicative of reliance of hominins on riverine ecosystem edge and gallery forest resources throughout their evolutionary history, is presented by Stinchcomb, Rogers & Semaw (2025).
- Williams et al. (2025) interpret early members of the genus Homo and, after the emergence of the Acheulean, Paranthropus boisei as the most likely makers of the Oldowan tools.
- Prat (2025) reports evidence of association of Oldowan tools from Lower Pleistocene sites and localities in East Africa both with members of the genus Homo and members of the genus Paranthropus, and interprets members of both genera as likely Oldowan toolmakers.
- Evidence of consistent production of Oldowan technology throughout a period of approximately 300,000 years (from 2.75 to 2.44 million years ago) is reported from the Namorotukunan site (Koobi Fora Formation; Kenya) by Braun et al. (2025).
- Evidence from the study of Oldowan tools from the Nyayanga site (Kenya), indicating that hominins living at least 2.6 million years ago produced the studied tools from nonlocal stones transported over long distances, is presented by Finestone et al. (2025).
- Villmoare et al. (2025) describe new fossil material of members of the genera Australopithecus and Homo from the Ledi-Geraru Research Project area (Ethiopia), providing evidence of coexistence of members of the two genera in the Afar Region before 2.5 million years ago.
- A study on the phylogenetic relationships of members of the genus Homo is published by Ni et al. (2025), who recover African and Asian Homo erectus/Homo ergaster populations as not forming a monophyletic group, and recover Harbin, Dali, Jinniushan, Xiahe and Hualongdong hominins as forming a monophyletic group closely related to Homo sapiens.
- Fannin et al. (2025) report evidence of behavioral shifts of early members of the genus Homo after 2.3 million years ago involving avoidance of C_{4} plants and ingestion of ^{18}O-depleted waters, possibly related to shift towards consumption of plant underground storage organs such as tubers, and report evidence indicating that these behavioral shifts preceded changes in tooth morphology.
- Coil (2025) proposes that the expansion of hominins out of Africa was facilitated by rich Eurasian carnivore community that created multiple scavenging opportunities for early hominins, and reports evidence that sustained hominin presence in Eurasia was followed by decrease in carnivore richness at the end of the Early Pleistocene.
- Curran et al. (2025) describe cut-marked bones interpreted as evidence of presence of hominins at the Grăunceanu site (Romania) at least 1.95 million years ago; their conclusions are contested by Kindler et al. (2025), who do not find the interpretation of purported cut marks as produced by hominins to be robustly supported.
- Doiron et al. (2025) report evidence indicating that early Pleistocene hominins from Olduvai Gorge (Tanzania) lived in environment with stable proportions of C_{3} and C_{4} plants throughout wetter and drier period, and with changing lake chemistry through time, including increased lake alkalinity during drier intervals.
- Evidence of systematic production of technologically and morphologically standardized bone tools by hominins living 1.5 million years ago is reported from Olduvai Gorge by de la Torre et al. (2025).
- A study on facial features of infants of early members of the genus Homo from the Lower Omo Valley (Ethiopia), Drimolen and Kromdraai (South Africa), providing evidence of presence of diagnostic facial features in the studied individuals from South Africa, is published by Braga & Moggi-Cecchi (2025).
- Evidence indicating that Homo habilis, unlike most australopiths but like modern humans, was not adapted to bite forcefully on its molar teeth is presented by Ledogar et al. (2025).
- Bae & Manthey (2025) revise the Out of Africa I model on the basis of anthropological discoveries from preceding years and advances in evolutionary biology, interpreted as indicating that not only Homo erectus, but also smaller-bodied, anatomically variable hominins might also have been capable of long-distance dispersal out ot Africa.
- Pietrobelli et al. (2025) study the anatomy of fibular ends of Homo floresiensis, interpreted as indicative of presence of a versatile ankle joint consistent with a locomotor repertoire including obligate bipedalism as well as climbing.
- Hakim et al. (2025) report the discovery of stone artifacts from fossiliferous layers from the Calio site (Sulawesi, Indonesia) that are at least 1.04 million years old and possibly up to 1.48 million years old, providing evidence that hominins colonized Sulawesi as early as (or earlier than) Flores.
- Burhan et al. (2025) report evidence of early human presence at the Leang Bulu Bettue site (Sulawesi, Indonesia) at least from the late Middle Pleistocene, as well as evidence of a technological shift at the site approximately 40,000 years that might have been caused by replacement of an early hominin population by modern humans or by different, uncertain trigger.
- Evidence linking the decline of Homo floresiensis and one of its primary prey (Stegodon florensis insularis) at Liang Bua to severe summer aridification of their environment is presented by Gagan et al. (2025).
- Chapman et al. (2025) reconstruct the skeleton of the leg of Homo naledi, and interpret its anatomy as casting doubt on the capabilities of H. naledi for endurance running.
- Baab (2025) presents a virtual reconstruction of the skull of the Turkana Boy.
- Suwa et al. (2025) present new magnetostratigraphic data for the KGA19 locality of the Konso Formation (Ethiopia), and argue that purported 2.0-1.9 million-years-old Melka Kunture site-complex reported by Mussi et al. (2023) might actually be approximately 1.6 million years old.
- Melis & Mussi (2025) reconstruct the landscape at Melka Kunture at the time of its settlement by early hominins, providing evidence of presence of a floodplain with a meandering river, and evidence of recurrent occupation of well-drained spots by Homo erectus and Homo heidelbergensis.
- Samim et al. (2025) determine distinct geochronological ages for the Lower, Middle and Upper Nariokotome tuffs (Turkana Basin, Kenya), improving age constraints for archaeological sites within the Nachukui Formation.
- Baab et al. (2025) present a reconstruction of the cranium of the DAN5/P1 specimen of Homo erectus from Gona, Ethiopia, providing evidence of presence of a mosaic of morphological features seen in Homo erectus and in more basal members of the genus Homo.
- Mercader et al. (2025) present evidence indicating that Homo erectus occupying the Engaji Nanyori locality (Olduvai Gorge, Tanzania) one million years ago lived in extremely dry environment, and showed ability to adapt to such environment through the strategic use of water resources present in the studied area.
- Falk, Zollikofer & Ponce de León (2025) hypothesize that structures buried within the lunate sulcus expanded and became part of the external cortical surface during the hominin evolution, resulting in fragmentation of the lunate sulcus, and report possible evidence of fragmentation of the lunate sulcus in Dmanisi hominins.
- Evidence from the study of hominin teeth from the Dmanisi assemblage, interpreted as indicative of presence of two distinct, coexisting hominin species at the Dmanisi site, is presented by Nery et al. (2025).
- Huguet et al. (2025) report the discovery of the midface of a hominin living between 1.4 million and 1.1 million years ago from the Sima del Elefante site (Spain), representing the oldest hominin face from Western Europe reported to date, and assign it to Homo aff. erectus.
- Review of known record of technologies used by hominins living in Europe from 1.4 million years ago to 600,000 years ago is published by Rodríguez-Álvarez & Lozano (2025).
- Vialet et al. (2025) reevaluate the age and morphological affinities of the frontal bone of a Pleistocene hominin from Kocabaş (Turkey) studied by Mori et al. (2024), and determine the studied fossil to be between 1.6 and 1.2 million years old.
- Fan et al. (2025) provide evidence of presence of open vegetative landscapes at the Majuangou site (China) during the Early Pleistocene, interpreted by the authors as facilitating dispersal and cultural development of hominins.
- Review of the nomenclature of the Middle Pleistocene hominins is published by Reed (2025).
- A study aiming to determine the connection between facial morphology and geography in Middle Pleistocene hominins is published by Olsen & White (2025).
- Review of the studies of skeletal proteomes of Middle and Late Pleistocene hominins, as well as of challenges in the proteomic analyses of the Pleistocene material, is published by Welker et al. (2025).
- Schroeder & Komza (2025) study the morphological variation of skull of Middle Pleistocene hominins from Africa, and interpret it as consistent with attribution of the studied hominins to a single ecological species lineage.
- Balzeau et al. (2025) revise the morphology of the Florisbad Skull, do not confirm the presence of pathological features reported by Curnoe & Brink (2010), and report evidence of presence of anatomical traits different from those of Homo sapiens.
- Miedzianogora, Shipton & Pope (2025) interpret the lithic assemblage from the Middle Pleistocene strata from the Kabwe mine (Zambia) as a likely transitional Early Stone Age/Middle Stone Age industry, and interpret this assemblage as indicating that early Middle Stone Age might be associated with hominins other than Homo sapiens.
- Evidence from the study of starch grains found on basalt tools from the Gesher Benot Ya'aqov site (Israel), indicating that Middle Pleistocene hominins from the site processed diverse plants, is preserved by Ahituv et al. (2025).
- Evidence from the study of stone tools, ochre fragments, animal remains likely accumulated by hominins and funerary practices of hominins from the Tinshemet Cave (Israel), interpreted as indicative of development of uniform behavior among mid-Middle Palaeolithic Levantine hominins that was likely related to interactions between different Homo groups, is presented by Zaidner et al. (2025).
- Yeshurun et al. (2025) interpret the assemblage dominated by aurochs from Unit III in Nesher Ramla (Israel) as more consistent with multiple episodes of isolated, planned and selective hunting by Middle Paleolithic archaic humans than with mass hunting, as interpret the studied assemblage as consistent with the interpretation of archaic humans occupying the site as living in small, disconnected groups.
- Nishiaki et al. (2025) determine that the hominin occupations of the Anghilak Cave (Uzbekistan) represent late Middle Paleolithic.
- Key et al. (2025) report evidence of hominin occupation of the Chequer's Wood and Old Park site (United Kingdom) during the Marine Isotope Stages 17–16, as well as evidence of occupation of the site by Acheulean hominins during the Anglian glacial stage.
- Evidence of controlled fire-making 400,000 years ago is reported from the Barnham site (United Kingdom) by Davis et al. (2025).
- Falguères et al. (2025) determine a minimum age of approximately 286,000 years for the Petralona skull, and interpret this individual as a member of a hominin lineage distinct from Neanderthals and modern humans.
- A study on the Middle Pleistocene elephant butchery site of Casal Lumbroso (Italy), providing evidence that the pre-Neanderthal hominins occupying the site exploited the straight-tusked elephant carcass from the site not only as a food source but also as a source of raw material for tool production, is published by Mecozzi et al. (2025).
- Liu et al. (2025) report the discovery of a new assemblage of wooden tools from the 300,000-year-old site of Gantangqing (甘棠箐) in southwest China, interpreted as digging sticks and small pointed tools, and expanding known range of hominins using wooden tools during the early Paleolithic.
- A study on teeth of Hualongdong people, providing evidence of presence of a mixture of primitive and derived dental features, is published by Wu et al. (2025).
- Evidence from the study of carbon isotopic data from tooth enamel of Pleistocene mammals from the Hualongdong site, indicating that Hualongdong people lived in environment that included a mosaic of dense forests and open woodlands, is presented by Ma et al. (2025).
- Hui, Wu & Balzeau (2025) study internal structures of the Maba Man, and report evidence of presence of combination of morphological features also present in different hominin species.
- Shao et al. (2025) determine that hominin occupation of the Xujiayao site (China) occurred in a period covering the Marine Isotope Stages 7 and 6.
- Evidence from the Donggou site in the Nihewan Basin (China), indicating that hominins occupied the site between 76,000 and 74,000 years ago and used flexible strategies to adapt to unstable environment, is presented by Xu et al. (2025).
- Curnoe et al. (2025) describe a hominin tooth from the Late Pleistocene strata from Gua Dagang (Trader's Cave) in the Niah National Park (Sarawak, Malaysia), interpreted as evidence of presence of an archaic hominin population in northern Borneo at the time or shortly before the first appearance of Homo sapiens in the studied area.
- Feng et al. (2025) present a new reconstruction of the Yunxian 2 cranium, and interpret this individual as an early member of the Homo longi lineage that also includes the majority of Asian Chibanian hominins.
- Tsutaya et al. (2025) identify the Penghu 1 mandible as belonging to a male Denisovan individual on the basis of paleoproteomic evidence.
- Fu et al. (2025) retrieve mitochondrial DNA from dental calculus of the Pleistocene hominin skull from Harbin (China) which is the holotype of Homo longi, and report that it falls within the variation of previously sequenced Denisovan mitochondrial DNA; Fu et al. (2025) retrieve 95 endogenous proteins from the same individual, and interpret them as supporting the assignment of the Harbin individual to a Denisovan population.
- Mishol et al. (2025) compare the Middle Pleistocene hominin skulls with the Denisovan anatomical profile reconstructed by Gokhman et al. (2019), recover the holotype of Homo longi, Dali Man and Kabwe 1 as showing particularly high resemblance to the predicted Denisovan profile, and interpret Kabwe 1 as more likely to be close to the root of the Neanderthal–Denisovan clade than to be a Denisovan.
- Trájer (2025) compares the climatic suitability of habitats occupied by Denisovans for development of several diseases, and argues that Denisovan genetic legacy might have contributed to pathogen resistance in modern humans.
- Yang et al. (2025) study variation in Denisovan ancestry across East Asia, interpreted as resulting from admixture among diverse early modern human lineages with differing levels of Denisovan ancestry, and report evidence of exceptionally limited Denisovan ancestry in Jōmon people.
- Ruan et al. (2025) report the discovery of a Quina technological system from the Longtan site, providing evidence that Middle Paleolithic technologies similar to those used by European Neanderthals were also used in southwest China 60,000-50,000 years ago.
- Evidence from the study of the mortality pattern of bisons from the TD10.2-BB bone bed layer from the Gran Dolina site in the Sierra de Atapuerca (Spain), interpreted as indicating that human groups occupying the site exploited bison sustainably, is presented by Rodríguez-Gómez et al. (2025).
- A study on evolutionary processes that resulted in the emergence of a mosaic of primitive and derived anatomical traits in the Middle Pleistocene hominin populations from the Neanderthal lineage is published by Rosas et al. (2025).
- Evidence indicating that, on average, Neanderthals had thicker cranial vault and its individual layers compared to modern humans is presented by Natahi et al. (2025).
- Review of evidence of biological and technological adaptations of Neanderthals to cold environments is published by Holliday et al. (2025).
- Macak et al. (2025) link the variant of AMPD1 present in Neanderthals to reduced AMPD activity in muscle extracts, and find possible evidence of its impact on athletic performance, but find no evidence of its significant impact on average human physiology.
- Possible evidence of impact of Neanderthal-derived single nucleotide variants within the EC1.45 enhancer cluster on SOX9 expression and jaw development in modern humans is presented by Uttley et al. (2025).
- Palancar, García-Martínez & Bastir (2025) study the morphology of the Neanderthal cervical spine, and report evidence that Neanderthals may not have a reduced cervical lordosis compared to modern humans.
- Beasley, Lesnik & Speth (2025) argue that reconstructions of Neanderthal diets based on studies of bulk collagen nitrogen stable isotope ratios should take into account that results of stable nitrogen isotope analyses might be affected by consumption of animal foods laced with maggots by Neanderthals.
- Evidence from the Velika Balanica cave (Serbia), indicating that toolkit originally thought to be devised for cervid processing in the Near East was used by Neanderthals occupying the site for ibex exploitation, is presented by Milošević et al. (2025).
- Radović et al. (2025) describe new hominin dental remains from the Velika Balanica cave, reinforcing evidence for Neanderthal presence in the central Balkans approximately 300,000 years ago.
- Buzi et al. (2025) describe complete inner nasal structures of the early Neanderthal skeleton from Altamura (Italy), and interpret their anatomy as indicating as the characteristic facial morphology of Neanderthals was not a direct result of adaptations of their upper airways to cold climate.
- Piccirilli et al. (2025) identify the human tooth from the Grotta del Poggio site (Italy) as belonging to a Neanderthal, and identify the human talus from the same site as belonging to a modern human from the Middle Bronze Age.
- Evidence of presence of inner ears with morphology similar to those seen in late Neanderthals is reported in Middle Pleistocene Neanderthals from Ehringsdorf and Reilingen (Germany) by Urciuoli et al. (2025).
- Evidence indicating that Schöningen spears are approximately 200,000 years old is presented by Hutson et al. (2025).
- Urciuoli et al. (2025) report evidence of reduction of morphological diversity of bony labyrinths in the Neanderthal lineage after the start of Marine Isotope Stage 5, interpreted as possibly related to a population bottleneck.
- Evidence from the study of body parts of large mammals from Neumark-Nord (Germany), interpreted as indicating that Neanderthals occupying the site during the Last Interglacial intensively processed carcasses of large mammals for marrow and grease, is presented by Kindler et al. (2025).
- Evidence from the study of Neanderthal stone tools from the Mousterian levels from the El Castillo cave (Cantabria, Spain), indicating that flint used to produce the tools was sourced from locations ranging between 23 and 420 km from the site, is presented by Herrero-Alonso et al. (2025).
- A study on remains of animals hunted by Neanderthals from the level D of the Axlor site (Spain), providing evidence of Neanderthals hunting different prey depending on the season, is published by Uzunidis et al. (2025).
- Evidence indicating that Neanderthals from the Scladina cave (Belgium) crafted bone tools from remains of cave lions, and selected long bones (tibia) for production of chisel-like tools that were subsequently fractured to produce bone retouchers, is presented by Abrams et al. (2025).
- A study on Neanderthal remains from the Goyet Caves (Belgium), providing evidence that Neanderthal cannibalism was targeted towards gracile, short-statured female individuals and possibly towards immature individuals, is presented by Cosnefroy et al. (2025), who interpreted cannibalistic behavior of Neanderthals from the studied site as possibly resulting from conflict between different Neanderthal groups.
- A modified part of a reindeer femur, identified as a tool used by Neanderthals for flaying carcasses, is described from the Abri du Maras site (France) by Doyon et al. (2025).
- Neanderthal tracks produced in coastal dune landscapes are reported from two new tracksites from Portugal by Neto de Carvalho et al. (2025).
- Evidence from the study of calcium and stable strontium isotope composition of remains of the Neanderthal individual from Gabasa (Spain), interpreted as indicative of a hypercarnivorous diet, is presented by Dodat et al. (2025).
- Degioanni et al. (2025) determine the extent of environments that were suitable from Neanderthal occupation in Europe between 90,000 and 50,000 years ago, report that the extent of suitable areas did not significantly decrease immediately prior to the disappearance of Neanderthals, and argue that the climate change was not the primary cause of the decline of European Neanderthals.
- Evidence from the study of a hip bone from the El Sidrón site (Spain), indicative of a previously unrecognized variability of the morphology of the Neanderthal pelvis, is presented by Torres-Tamayo et al. (2025).
- Pigott et al. (2025) mitochondrial genome from a bone of a 46 to 45,000 years old Neanderthal from the Starosele site (Crimea), and report evidence of affinities of the studied individual with Neanderthals from the Altai region of Russian Siberia.
- A study on ochre use by Neanderthals associated with the Crimean Micoquien is published by d'Errico et al. (2025), who identify ochre pieces in the studied sample with characteristics that are hard to explain through utilitarian activities alone, and might be evidence of symbolic use of ochre by Neanderthals.
- Amadei, Lin & Fattorini (2025) calculate that recurrent gene mixing resulting from small-scale Homo sapiens immigrations could have resulted in genetic assimilation of Neanderthals with modern humans.
- The first association of shell beads and Châtelperronian industry is reported from the La-Roche-à-Pierrot site (France) by Bachellerie et al. (2025).
- Villanea et al. (2025) identify one of the haplotypes of the MUC19 gene in modern humans as inherited from Neanderthals who in turn likely inherited it from Denisovans, and find this haplotype to be under positive selection in modern humans and possibly linked to adaptations of Indigenous Americans to their environment.
- Evidence from the study of the Bété I site from the Anyama locality (Ivory Coast), indicative of human occupation of West African wet tropical forests dating to around 150,000 years ago, is presented by Ben Arous et al. (2025).
- Velliky et al. (2025) describe Middle Stone Age artifacts made from ochre from the Blombos Cave (South Africa), interpreted as retouchers and pressure flakers.
- Hallett et al. (2025) report evidence of expansion in human niche breadth that began around 70,000 years ago, resulting in distinctive ecological flexibility of humans contributing to their successful dispersal out of Africa.
- Röding et al. (2025) study the morphology of teeth of a juvenile hominin individual from the Pleistocene Mugharet el'Aliya cave site (Morocco), and interpret it as consistent with affinities with the Homo sapiens lineage.
- Timbrell et al. (2025) provide evidence of ecological differences between northwestern and eastern Africa during the Middle Stone Age, and argue that those differences might have been drivers of cultural diversification between human populations producing Middle Stone Age technology.
- A study on the timing of transition between the Middle and Late Stone Age at Olduvai Gorge (Tanzania), as indicated by new chronology of middle and upper units of Naisiusiu Beds, is published by Stanistreet et al. (2025).
- Godinho et al. (2025) report limited effectiveness of machine learning models trained on data from collections of late modern individuals from the Luis Lopes collection (Portugal) in sex determination of mandibles from the temporally and geographically distant Late Pleistocene population from Jebel Sahaba (Sudan).
- Falcucci & Kuhn (2025) compare stone tool assemblages from northern Ahmarian and post-Ahmarian layers at Ksar Akil (Lebanon) with Protoaurignacian assemblages from Italy, and find no evidence indicating that Protoaurignacian originated from Levantine Ahmarian technologies.
- Jiang et al. (2025) provide evidence of rapid increase in fire activity in the East China Sea region since 50,000 years ago, interpreted as linked to increase in fire utilization by humans.
- Kaifu et al. (2025) report evidence from sea travel from Taiwan to Yonaguni conducted in 2019, using a dugout canoe produced with Upper Paleolithic tools, indicating that Paleolithic people were capable crossing the strait separating Taiwan and the Ryukyu Islands in spite of strong currents; Chang et al. (2025) report that such sea crossing required awareness of the Kuroshio Current, adjustment of paddling to counteract it, and choice of the right departure place by the Paleolithic people.
- A study on the Late Paleolithic Dadong site in the Changbai Mountains (China), providing evidence of three distinct phases of human occupation overlapping with major climatic shifts of Marine Isotope Stage 3, Last Glacial Maximum and post-Last Glacial Maximum, is published by Xu et al. (2025).
- Evidence from experiments with raw and roasted turtle remains processed with replicated Paleolithic stone tools, interpreted as indicating that in-shell roasting of turtles observed at the Paleolithic sites in the Mediterranean Basin and the Iberian Peninsula resulted in reduction of labor during processing of cooked animals, is presented by Nabais et al. (2025), who interpret cooking and processing of turtles observed at the Paleolithic sites as likely to be a cognitively sophisticated and socially transmitted behavior.
- Evidence from the study of mammalian remains from the Isturitz cave (France), indicative of stability of hunting strategies of people occupying the site during the Marine Isotope Stage 3 in spite of climate cooling and opening of landscapes, is presented by Berlioz et al. (2025).
- Kitagawa et al. (2025) report evidence from ballistic experiments with arrows and spears shot using crossbow, bow and spear-thrower, from the study of their damage type and size and from comparison with Aurignacian osseous projectile points, indicating that breakage patterns of the studied armatures depend mostly on the raw material and size of the armature rather than on the launching mechanism, and argue that hunting gears with diverse launching mechanisms might have been used from the onset of the early Upper Paleolithic.
- Matthews et al. (2025) study new palaeoclimatic record from Llangorse (South Wales, United Kingdom) near the earliest British archaeological sites, and find that repopulation of the northwest margin of Europe by humans after the Last Glacial Maximum was supported by local summer warming.
- Schürch, Conard & Schmidt (2025) study the raw material sourcing of tools from the Gravettian and Magdalenian sites in Germany, and interpret their findings as indicating that territories of foraging groups that occupied the studied sites spanned across 300 km.
- Lahaye et al. (2025) use hyperspectral imaging to identify previously unknown paintings from the Mayenne-Sciences cave (France).
- Sparacello et al. (2025) study projectile impact marks from remains of a Paleolithic individual from the Riparo Tagliente site (Italy), interpreted as possible evidence of a conflict between different groups of hunter-gatherers, and among the oldest possible evidence of such conflicts.
- Evidence of exploitation of diverse birds for food, utilitarian purposes and ornamentation by Upper Paleolithic human groups from the Romito Cave (Italy) is presented by Carrera & Martini (2025).
- Mori et al. (2025) confirm that the AC12 cranium from the Upper Paleolithic Arene Candide site (Italy) represents the oldest human skull with evidence of artificial modification from Europe reported to date.
- Marginedas et al. (2025) interpret evidence of manipulation of human remains from the Magdalenian site Maszycka Cave (Poland) as consistent with cannibalistic behavior.
- Evidence from the study of a large mitogenome dataset from human populations from Sahul and western Pacific, indicating that settlement of Sahul began by 60,000 years ago through at least two distinct routes, is presented by Gandini et al. (2025).
- The oldest evidence of human occupation of high-altitude territories in Australia reported to date, indicative of occupation of Dargan Shelter in the upper Blue Mountains during the Last Glacial Maximum, is presented by Way et al. (2025).
- Archer et al. (2025) find evidence indicating that a cut on a sthenurine kangaroo tibia from the Mammoth Cave in Western Australia reported by Archer, Crawford & Merrilees (1980) was produced long after the death of the animal and likely after the fossilization of the bone, interpret the tooth of Zygomaturus trilobus gifted to Kim Akerman by Indigenous Australians from Mount Hart in the Kimberley region as originating from southern Australia, and argue that the First Peoples in Australia collected fossils and transported them over long distances.
- New evidence interpreted as supporting dating of the White Sands footprints to the Last Glacial Maximum is presented by Holliday et al. (2025).
- Madsen et al. (2025) review stone tool assemblages from North America that are older than cultural deposits of Clovis age and preserve evidence of technological similarities with approximately 20,000-years-old tools from northern Japan, and characterize them as representing American Upper Paleolithic lithic technology.
- Wygal et al. (2025) revise evidence of ecology and behavior of the first Alaskans from the study of stone and mammoth ivory tools from the Holzman site in the Tanana Valley.
- A study on the human distribution in South America during the late Pleistocene is published by Becerra-Valdivia (2025), who reports evidence of adaptation of humans to cold environments during the Antarctic Cold Reversal and widespread occupation of the continent that likely happened after the Younger Dryas.
- A study on mammalian assemblages from sites in southern South America dated before 11.600 calibrated years B.P. and on evidence of their associations with humans is published by Prates, Medina & Perez (2025), who report evidence indicating that extinct megafauna were the principal prey item of early foragers in the studied area, who broadened their diet by including other animals only after the decline of abundance of megafauna.
- Labarca, Prieto & Massone (2025) reconstruct subsistence strategies of early hunter–gatherers in southern South America, based on faunal remains from the Late Pleistocene sites Cueva Lago Sofía 1 and Tres Arroyos 1, and interpret the people occupying the sites as primarily exploiting canids and camelids, with extinct mammals exploited as supplementary resources.
- Ben-Dor & Barkai (2025) argue that cultural and technological innovations of the Upper Paleolithic were driven by human need to restore non-protein energy intake in the aftermath of Late Pleistocene extinctions of large-bodied, fat-rich megafauna.
- Guagnin et al. (2025) identify rock art and artifacts from sites south of the Nafud desert (Saudi Arabia) as evidence of human occupation of the interior of northern Arabia during the Pleistocene-Holocene transition, made possible by use of seasonal water bodies.
- A late Epipalaeolithic clay figure depicting an interaction between a woman and a goose, interpreted as presenting a mythological scene consistent with an animistic belief system, is described from Nahal Ein Gev II (Israel) by Davin, Munro & Grosman (2025).
- Stimpson et al. (2025) describe a skeleton from the Thung Binh 1 cave site (Tràng An Landscape Complex World Heritage Site, Vietnam) dated 12 500–12 000 years before present, interpreted as belonging to an individual with affinities with a Late Pleistocene indigenous hunter–gatherer population and unrelated to East Asian farmer populations, and preserving evidence of a neck injury interpreted as likely caused by a small projectile.
- Hung et al. (2025) revise 54 hunter-gatherer burials from archaeological sites from southern China and Southeast Asia ranging from the latest Pleistocene to the Middle Holocene, and identify early examples of smoke-dried mummification of the dead similar to practices recorded in Australian and New Guinean societies, with the oldest confirmed examples of mummification from Huiyaotian in China predating both Chinchorro mummies and Ancient Egyptian mummies.
- Evidence from the study of ribcages of fossil Homo sapiens, indicative of impact of climatic conditions on size and shape of ribcages in the studied individuals, is presented by López-Rey et al. (2025).
- Alperson-Afil & Rabinovich (2025) report evidence from experimental burial of a wild boar in a Natufian-like open-air grave, indicative of post-depositional modifications of the grave and its contents similar to those observed in Natufian grave sites, interpret Natufians as possessing deep knowledge of the different phases of postmortem changes, and interpret Natufian funerary practices as requiring collective effort and likely reinforcing social cohesion.
- Evidence from the study of ancient DNA of individuals living in Eurasia in the time interval spanning from 45,000 to 1700 years ago, indicative of persistence of individuals with dark or intermediate skin colors in Europe up to the Iron Age (coexisting with individuals with light skin colors since the Mesolithic), is presented by Perretti et al. (2025).
- Guyon, Heyer & Chaix (2025) study kinship systems in Neolithic and Bronze Age European populations as indicated by ancient DNA evidence, and interpret genetic diversity observed in Neolithic and Bronze Age sites as compatible with a patrilocal residence system, but do not firm evidence conclusively supporting a patrilineal descent in the studied populations.
- Weber et al. (2025) study the clinical consequences of injuries of Ötzi, and argue that the studied individual likely survived for several hours after being subjected to interpersonal violence, and that he was able to bandage his wounds.
- Nogué et al. (2025) review studies from the precedings years and methods used in the study of long-term human influences on past ecosystems.
- Glantz & Radovčić (2025) review the history of study of paleoanthropological records from Croatia and Central Asia, and argue that geopolitical and scientific hegemonies resulted in paleoanthropology disproportionately representing the work of scholars studying the material from areas such as western Europe, Levant and Africa and the theoretical perspectives emanating from these scholars, while the paleoanthropological records from the former socialist sphere were interpreted as discontinuous or as edges and outposts, resulting in their marginalization.

=== Rodents ===
Name	Novelty	Status	Authors	Age	Type locality	Country	Notes	Images
Dolocylindrodon farkei	Sp. nov	Valid	Lofgren et al.	Eocene (Uintan)	Dell Beds Formation	United States (Montana)		
Episiphneus orkhonensis	Sp. nov		Golovanov & Zazhigin	Pliocene-Pleistocene		Mongolia	A zokor.	
Episiphneus pentasolenis	Sp. nov		Golovanov & Zazhigin	Pliocene-Pleistocene		Mongolia	A zokor.	
Farangimys	Gen. et sp. nov	Valid	Calede & Socki	Hemingfordian	Pawnee Creek Beds	United States (Colorado)	A stem geomyoid. The type species is F. megalotrogos.	
Golunda mohandensis	Sp. nov		Singh et al.	Pliocene		India	A species of Golunda.	
Kowalskia weni	Sp. nov		Feroz et al.	Miocene		China	A member of the family Cricetidae.	
Maneramus	Gen. et comb. nov	Valid	Kimura et al.	Miocene	Nagri Formation	India; Pakistan	A member of the family Muridae belonging to the subfamily Murinae. The type species is "Progonomys" morganae Kimura, Flynn & Jacobs (2017).	
Mesocricetus fengi	Sp. nov		Qiu et al.	Miocene		China	A species of Mesocricetus.	
Progonomys mixtus	Sp. nov	Valid	Van Dam & Zachariasse	Miocene		Greece	A member of the family Muridae belonging to the subfamily Murinae.	
Proharrymys ophietes	Sp. nov	Valid	Bell, Storer & Gilbert	Oligocene (Whitneyan)	Cypress Hills Formation	Canada (Saskatchewan)		
Protabrocoma chasicoensis	Sp. nov		Olivares et al.	Miocene	Cerro Azul Formation	Argentina	A chinchilla rat.	
Pseudadjidaumo primoris	Sp. nov	Valid	Korth & Boyd	Oligocene	Brule Formation	United States Nebraska		
Rhinocerodon linxiamys	Sp. nov		Qiu et al.	Miocene		China	A member of the family Cricetidae.	
Sibirosiphneus	Gen. et sp. et comb. nov		Golovanov & Zazhigin	Pleistocene		Russia	A zokor. Genus includes new species S. obensis, as well as "Prosiphneus" razdoleanensis Golovanov & Zazhigin (2023).	
Sinocricetus primus	Sp. nov		Qiu et al.	Miocene		China	A member of the family Cricetidae.	
Storchipedetes	Gen. et sp. nov	Valid	Fazal et al.	Miocene		China	A member of the family Pedetidae. The type species is S. afroasiaticus.	
Tenuicricetodon	Gen. et sp. nov	Valid	Maridet et al.	Oligocene (Rupelian)	Dâncu Formation	Romania	A member of the family Cricetidae belonging to the subfamily Eucricetodontinae. The type species is T. arcemis.	
Vasseuromys balatonicus	Sp. nov	Valid	Hír	Miocene (Turolian)	Csodabogyós Cave	Hungary	A dormouse.	

==== Rodent research ====
- Quintana Cardona & Riera Pons (2025) study the morphology of the cribriform plate of a member of the genus Hypnomys from the Ses Tapareres Cave in Menorca (Spain), and interpret the sensory systems of Hypnomys as better developed than those of Myotragus balearicus and Nuralagus rex.
- Sinitsa (2025) revises known fossil record of members of the genus Glis.
- Čermák (2025) revises the anatomy and affinities of Ameniscomys selenoides on the basis of the study of known and new fossil material, and names a new subfamily Ameniscomyinae.
- Grau-Camats et al. (2025) describe new fossil material of Miopetaurista webbi from the Gray Fossil Site (Tennessee, United States) and interpret the species as likely closely related to the Eurasian species M. thaleri.
- Zonneveld et al. (2025) interpret the accumulation of middle Pleistocene mammal bones from the Làng Tráng cave complex (Vietnam) as mainly resulting from scavenging activities of porcupines.
- Candela, García-Esponda & Noriega (2025) revise the holotype of Paradoxomys cancrivorus from the Miocene strata in northeast Argentina, and reassign it to the species Coendou magnus.
- Fernández et al. (2025) revise the fossil material of late Pleistocene caviines from the Buenos Aires Province (Argentina), and reaffirm the validity of Galea tixiensis.
- White et al. (2025) describe fossil material of 44 specimens of Neochoerus aesopi from the fossil outcrops at Térapa, representing the northernmost late Pleistocene (Rancholabrean) record of Neochoerus in Mexico reported to date.
- Escamilla et al. (2025) describe fossil material of members of the genera Prolagostomus and Chasicomys from the Miocene strata in the Calahoyo locality (Jujuy Province, Argentina), representing the first recorded co-occurrence of members of the two genera and extending known temporal range of Prolagostomus.
- Rasia (2025) revises the composition of the dinomyid assemblage from the Miocene Ituzaingó Formation (Argentina), and reduces its taxonomic diversity from 18 genera and 27 species to 13 genera and 19 species.
- New information on the anatomy and affinities of Telicomys giganteus, based on the study of a new specimen, is provided by Rasia et al. (2025).
- A study on the brain morphology of Pliocene specimens of Eumysops chapalmalensis is published by Fernández Villoldo et al. (2025).
- Netto et al. (2025) report evidence indicating that morphology of atlas and axis in extant members of the family Echimyidae is shaped by phylogenetic relatedness and by ecological factors, and interpret the vertebral morphology of Eumysops chapalmalensis as consistent with the interpretation of this rodent as terrestrial or semi-fossorial.
- Peralta et al. (2025) describe a tooth of a member of the tribe Echimyini from the Greenlandian strata in the Entre Ríos Province (Argentina), with morphology indicative of affinities with the extant Amazonian genus Lonchothrix, and interpret this finding as consistent with existence of a biogeographic connection between Amazonia and the southern cone of South America during the early Holocene.
- Busker, Pérez & Krause (2025) describe the first fossil material of Perimys erutus and P. intermedius from the Miocene (Colhuehuapian) strata from the Sacanana locality (Sarmiento Formation; Chubut Province, Argentina), increasing known diversity of caviomorph rodents from the site.
- Solórzano et al. (2025) identify fossil material of Acarechimys minutus from the Miocene strata from the Laguna del Laja site (Cura-Mallín Formation, Chile), and interpret this finding as indicating that the Santacrucian mammalian fauna from Laguna del Laja was not fully endemic.
- Bogel, Vassallo & Becerra (2025) reconstruct jaw adductor muscles of Actenomys priscus, estimate its bite force, and report evidence of closer similarity of its musculature and (estimated) bite force to those of octodontids than to those of extant tuco-tucos.
- De Santi & Verzi (2025) revise the Pleistocene tuco-tuco species Ctenomys latidens, interpreting it as a distinct species and likely a senior synonym of C. dasseni and C. intermedius.
- A study on the evolution of the morphological variation of skulls and mandibles of tuco-tucos, based on data from extant and extinct taxa, is published by De Santi, Álvarez & Verzi (2025).
- A study on the phylogenetic relationships and evolutionary history of extant and fossil birch mice is published by Zhu et al. (2025).
- Crespo et al. (2025) study the composition of the early Miocene muroid assemblage from the Ribesalbes-Alcora Basin (Spain), and interpret the studied rodents as living in an environmental that was transitional between forests of west Europe and drier interior of the Iberian Peninsula.
- A study on the evolutionary history of the family Platacanthomyidae, as indicated by genomic data from extant species and by fossil record, is published by Kang et al. (2025).
- Chang et al. (2025) describe new fossil material of Eospalax simplicidens from the Pleistocene Sanmen Formation (Shaanxi, China), extending known geographical range of this species and providing new information on its skull anatomy.
- A study on changes of the first molar during the evolutionary history of the Kislangia lineage in Western Europe during the late Pliocene and early Pleistocene is published by Agustí, Lozano-Fernández & Piñero (2025).
- A study on the evolution of tooth morphology of arvicoline rodents, as indicated by data from fossil record and by data on development of teeth of extant arvicolines, is published by Lafuma et al. (2025), who interpret their findings as indicating that morphological evolution of teeth was shaped by tooth development.
- A study on the affinities and evolutionary history of Megaoryzomys curioi, as indicated by mitochondrial sequences extracted from its remains, is published by Bover et al. (2025).
- Fox & Blois (2025) identify molars of pack rats from the Project 23 Deposits of the La Brea Tar Pits as belonging to big-eared woodrats.
- A study on the morphology of molars of Pleistocene large-bodied rats from the Mata Menge site (Flores, Indonesia) and on their affinities is published by Hayes et al. (2025), who report evidence of similarities of the studied molars with those of Hooijeromys nusatenggara and Verhoeven's giant rat.
- Vincent et al. (2025) describe the brain endocasts of the Tenerife giant rat and the Gran Canaria giant rat, providing evidence of changes of brain structure likely resulting in reduction of senses in the studied rats compared to their relatives.
- Hall & Storer (2025) study the composition of the Oligocene (Whitneyan) rodent assemblage from the Rodent Hill locality (Cypress Hills Formation; Saskatchewan, Canada), identifying four eomyid taxa, five cricetids and an early occurrence of Plesiosminthus geringensis.
- Review of the fossil record of rodent assemblages from the Siwaliks, and of changes of their composition throughout the Neogene, is published by Badgley et al. (2025).
- Rodríguez-Sánchez et al. (2025) study the composition of the rodent assemblage from the GIIb and GIIIa Subunits of Galería site (Spain), and interpret it as indicative of presence of an open grassland with a Mediterranean climate during the Middle Pleistocene.

=== Other euarchontoglires ===
Name	Novelty	Status	Authors	Age	Type locality	Country	Notes	Images
Paromomys borealis	Sp. nov		Scott et al.	Paleocene		Canada (Alberta)	A plesiadapiform belonging to the family Paromomyidae.	
Paromomys ignis	Sp. nov		Scott et al.	Paleocene		Canada (Alberta)	A plesiadapiform belonging to the family Paromomyidae.	
Sinolagomys guchengensis	Sp. nov	Valid	Wang, Qiu & Li	Miocene	Shangzhuang Formation	China	A pika.	

==== Miscellaneous euarchontoglires research ====
- Čermák et al. (2025) revise the taxonomy of Pliocene lagomorphs from the Tollo de Chiclana section of the Guadix Basin (Spain).
- A study on the morphology of skull and teeth of Prolagus michauxi from its type locality of Sète (France) is published by Sen (2025).
- Kalaitzi & Kostopoulos (2025) describe new fossil material of Trischizolagus from the Pliocene strata from the Megalo Emvolon-4 site (Greece), providing new information on the cranial anatomy of T. dumitrescuae.
- A study on the evolutionary history of the European rabbit in southwestern Europe, as indicated by fossil record of 55 populations spanning from the Middle to Late Pleistocene, is published by Pelletier (2025).
- Chester et al. (2025) describe a specimen of Mixodectes pungens from the Paleocene Nacimiento Formation (New Mexico, United States) representing the most complete mixodectid specimen reported to date, and interpret its anatomy as supporting the primatomorphan affinities of mixodectids.
- New information on the anatomy of the skull of Plesiolestes nacimienti is provided by Crowell, Beard & Chester (2025).
- Monclús-Gonzalo et al. (2025) study the relationship between tarsal shape and locomotor behavior in extant primates and apply their findings to plesiadapiforms and early euprimates, reporting evidence of diverse locomotor repertoires in the latter group.
- Patnaik et al. (2025) identify fossil material of Paraulacodus indicus in the Sivapithecus indicus locality of Rashole in Siwaliks (Jammu and Kashmir, India), and interpret this finding as indicating that fossils from the Rashole locality and nearby Sunetar-2 site (including fossils of Kapi ramnagarensis and Ramadapis sahnii) can be dated as approximately 13 million years old.
- Toussaint, Youlatos & Nyakatura (2025) determine possible vertical descent behaviors in 13 extinct members of Euarchontoglires, and argue that adaptations for vertical locomotion might have promoted use of upright postures in early euprimates.

== Laurasiatherians ==
=== Artiodactyls ===
==== Cetaceans ====
Name	Novelty	Status	Authors	Age	Type locality	Country	Notes	Images
Albacetus	Gen. et sp. nov	Valid	Bisconti et al.	Late Miocene	Sant'Agata Fossili Marls Formation	Italy	A member of the family Cetotheriidae. Genus includes new species A. salvifactus.	
Amphidelphis	Gen. et comb. nov	Valid	Lambert et al.	Early Miocene	Chilcatay Formation	United States (California) Peru	A derived odontocete. The type species is "Acrodelphis" bakersfieldensis Wilson (1935)	
Chilcacetus ullujayensis	Sp. nov	Valid	Lambert et al.	Miocene (Burdigalian)	Chilcatay Formation	Peru		
Cochimicetus	Gen. et sp. nov	Valid	Cedillo-Avila, González-Barba & Solis-Añorve	Oligocene	San Gregorio Formation	Mexico	A member of the family Eomysticetidae. The type species is C. convexus.	
Eophyseter	Gen. et sp. nov	Valid	Bisconti et al.	Pliocene	Sabbie d'Asti Formation	Italy	A member of the family Physeteridae. The type species is E. damarcoi.	
Flandriacetus	Gen. et sp. nov		Post, Bosselaers & Munsterman	Miocene (Tortonian)	Westerschelde, North Sea Basin	Netherlands	A member of the family Ziphiidae. The type species is F. gijseni.	
Janjucetus dullardi	Sp. nov	Valid	Duncan et al.	Oligocene	Jan Juc Marl	Australia	A member of the family Mammalodontidae.	
Megabalaena	Gen. et sp. nov	Valid	Tanaka et al.	Late Miocene (Tortonian)	Toyama Formation	Japan	A member of the family Balaenidae. The type species is M. sapporoensis.	

===== Cetacean research =====
- Peacock et al. (2025) study evolution of the hearing ability in Eocene cetaceans, and find no strong evidence of a link between changes in relative brain size and shifts toward high-frequency hearing.
- A study on changes of shape of the humerus in extant and extinct cetaceans is published by Ghazali et al. (2025).
- A study on the morphological variation of the mandibular symphysis in extant and extinct cetaceans is published by Strauch, Pyenson & Peredo (2025).
- Evidence indicating that shifts in morphology of the mandibular symphysis during the evolutionary history of cetaceans coincided with ocean restructuring and diversification of feeding modes is presented by Strauch et al. (2025).
- Park et al. (2025) study the mandibular shape variation in extant and extinct cetaceans with different feeding strategies, and find that adaptations of the cetacean mandibles to multiple functions (such as their adaptations to serve both as a part of feeding apparatus and as a part of auditory pathway) causes evolution of shapes resulting in decreased optimality of their adaptations to feeding.
- Berger et al. (2025) study the endocranial anatomy of Protocetus atavus, reporting evidence of a relatively larger brain compared to other Eocene non-basilosaurid cetaceans and no evidence of reduced sense of smell in Protocetus.
- Van Vliet et al. (2025) revise the fossil record of cetaceans from the Barton Clay Formation from Barton-on-Sea (Hampshire, United Kingdom), providing evidence of presence of three archaeocete taxa (Pachycetus cf. paulsonii, Pachycetus cf. humilis and "Zygorhiza" wanklyni).
- Paul & Larramendi (2025) provide new estimates of body size of Perucetus colossus, interpreted as most likely to have body length of 15 to 16 m and body mass of 35 to 40 tonnes.
- Redescription and a study on the affinities of Prosqualodon australis is published by Gaetán et al. (2025).
- Nelson, Lambert & Uhen (2025) revise the validity of European members of the family Squalodontidae, recognizing only 8 valid species, and redescribe Squalodon grateloupii and Eosqualodon langewieschei.
- Amane, Bianucci & Zouhri (2025) describe a mandible of an indeterminate member of Globicephalinae from the Pliocene strata of the Asilah Basin (Morocco), with a morphology intermediate between mandibles of dolphins adapted to suction feeding and those adapted to grasping.
- Watmore, Prothero & Madan Richards (2025) describe a tooth of a large-bodied member of Physeteroidea from the Miocene strata in California (most likely from the Capistrano Formation), providing evidence of presence of Livyatan-like macroraptorial sperm whales in the North Pacific.
- Redescription and a study on the affinities of Idiorophus patagonicus is published by Paolucci, Buono & Fernández (2025).
- Marx & Campbell (2025) describe fossil material of Llanocetus sp. from the Eocene strata from Chatham Island (New Zealand; probably Te Whanga Limestone), representing the first record of a member of this genus found outside Antarctica.
- Hernández Cisneros & Velez-Juarbe (2025) describe the skeletal anatomy of Fucaia goedertorum, and interpret the studied cetacean as a raptorial feeder with high maneuverability.
- Nobile et al. (2025) describe the skull of an archaic chaeomysticete, possibly closely related to the Oligocene Horopeta, from the Miocene (Burdigalian) Chilcatay Formation (Peru), representing the oldest chaeomysticete specimen from the southeastern Pacific reported to date.
- Davydenko et al. (2025) present a full-size 3D surface scan and a complete digital restoration of the skeleton of the holotype of Cetotherium riabinini.
- Solis-Añorve & Buono (2025) describe probable non-neobalaenine cetotheriid fossil material from the Miocene Puerto Madryn Formation (Argentina), expanding known diversity of baleen whale morphotypes from Patagonia.
- Farnkopf et al. (2025) report evidence of a link between the size of the cribriform plate in extant cetaceans and other artiodactyls and the number of olfactory receptor genes encoded in their genomes, and interpret the fossil record as indicative of loss of olfactory receptor genes by Eocene cetaceans before they became obligately aquatic, as well as suggestive of partial preservation of olfaction in some Miocene toothed whales.

==== Other artiodactyls ====
Name	Novelty	Status	Authors	Age	Type locality	Country	Notes	Images
Aegyptomeryx	Gen. et sp. nov	Valid	Pickford & Gawad	Miocene		Egypt	An anthracothere. Genus includes new species A. grandis.	
Brachyodus aequatorialis nacholaensis	Ssp. nov	Valid	Tsubamoto et al.	Miocene (Langhian)	Aka Aiteputh Formation	Kenya	An anthracothere.	
Brachyodus nancrayensis	Sp. nov	Valid	Pickford	Miocene		France	An anthracothere.	
Brachyodus pontigneensis	Sp. nov	Valid	Pickford	Miocene		France	An anthracothere.	
Capra crimiensis	Sp. nov	Valid	Vislobokova & Yarmolchyk	Pleistocene		Crimea	A species of Capra	
Chitenaymeryx	Gen. et comb. nov	Valid	Pickford	Miocene		France	An anthracothere. Genus includes "Brachyodus" intermedius Mayet (1908).	
Elomeryx starckae	Sp. nov	Valid	Richmond et al.	Arikareean		United States (South Dakota)	An anthracothere.	
Gobiomeryx santaohoensis	Sp. nov	Valid	Wang, Wang & Zhang	Oligocene		China		
Hypsodontus sinensis	Sp. nov	Valid	Jin, Jiangzuo & Wang	Miocene	Dongxiang Formation	China		
Labrangomeryx	Gen. et sp. nov		Wang et al.	Miocene		China	A stem-pecoran. Genus includes new species L. dorcapolis.	
Leptobos etruscus flerovi	Ssp. nov	Valid	Vislobokova, Titov & Yarmolchyk	Pleistocene		Crimea	A bovid. Published online in 2026, but the issue date is listed as December 2025.	
Lophiomeryx zongi	Sp. nov		Wang et al.	Eocene		China		
Lyrakeryx	Nom. nov		Rios & Solounias	Miocene	Chinji Formation	Pakistan	A member of the family Giraffidae; a replacement name for Lyra Rios & Solounias (2024).	
Masrimeryx	Gen. et comb. nov	Valid	Pickford & Gawad	Miocene		Egypt	An anthracothere. Genus includes "Afromeryx" palustris Miller et al. (2014).	
Mogharameryx	Gen. et comb. nov	Valid	Pickford & Gawad	Miocene		Egypt	An anthracothere. Genus includes "Brachyodus" mogharensis Pickford (1991).	
Nacholameryx	Gen. et sp. nov	Valid	Tsubamoto et al.	Miocene (Langhian)	Aka Aiteputh Formation	Kenya	An anthracothere belonging to the tribe Merycopotamini. The type species is N. baragoiensis.	
Oligokeryx	Gen. et sp. nov		Ducrocq et al.	Oligocene		Thailand	An anthracothere. Genus includes new species O. khiansaensis.	
Orea	Gen. et sp. nov	Valid	Solounias & Ríos	Miocene	Chinji Formation	Pakistan	A member of the family Giraffidae belonging to the subfamily Giraffinae. The type species is O. leptia.	
Ovis claudiusguerini	Sp. nov	Valid	Crégut-Bonnoure	Pleistocene		France	A species of Ovis.	
Pachyportax zhaotongensis	Sp. nov		Guo et al.	Miocene	Zhaotong Formation	China	A bovid belonging to the tribe Bovini.	
Praetragulus ordosianus	Sp. nov	Valid	Wang, Wang & Zhang	Oligocene		China		
Qilin	Gen. et comb. nov	Valid	Wang et al.	Miocene	Tunggur Formation	China	A member of the family Giraffidae belonging to the subfamily Giraffinae. Genus includes "Palaeotragus" tungurensis Colbert (1936).	
Soergelia longdanensis	Sp. nov		Bai & Wang	Pleistocene	Linxia Basin	China		
Speleotherium	Gen. et sp. nov	Valid	White, Mead & Morgan	Pleistocene		Belize; Mexico; United States (New Mexico)	An ovibovin bovid. Genus includes new species S. logani.	
Xenocervulus	Gen. et comb. nov	Valid	Croitor	Pliocene		France	A deer belonging to the subfamily Cervinae. The type species is "Cervus" ruscinensis Depéret (1890).	

===== Other artiodactyl research =====
- Robson & Theodor (2025) reevaluate the anatomy and affinities of Bunomeryx, and consider its classification as purported early tylopod to be uncertain.
- Robson et al. (2025) compare the petrosal and bony labyrinth anatomy of the extant vicuña, four early camelids and two oromerycids, and interpret the anatomy of Eotylopus as supporting the interpretation of oromerycids as closely related to camelids.
- Kalmykov (2025) studies the morphology of camel limb bones from the Middle Pleistocene strata from western Transbaikalia (Russia), assigns the studied fossil material to Camelus cf. knoblochi, and interprets the studied camel as larger than Pliocene and extant forms.
- Prothero & Kottkamp (2025) describe the skull of Hesperhys vagrans from the Miocene Barstow Formation (California, United States) reported by Lofgren et al. (2015), providing new information on the skull morphology of this species.
- A study on the dental morphology and on the affinities of "Parachleuastochoerus" valentini is published by Alba et al. (2025), who interpret the studied species as distinct from Conohyus simorrensis and Versoporcus steinheimensis, and interpret the genus Parachleuastochoerus as likely polyphyletic.
- Yang et al. (2025) report the first discovery of fossil material of a member of the genus Cainochoerus from the Miocene Lemudong'o Formation (Kenya).
- A study on tooth wear and probable dietary preferences of members of the genus Kolpochoerus from the Shungura Formation (Ethiopia) is published by Louail et al. (2025), who interpret their findings as suggestive of high consumption of low-abrasive grasses and forbs.
- A study on the morphology of the skull and teeth of Sus brachygnatus and Sus macrognathus is published by Pacheco-Scarpitta (2025).
- Lopatin (2025) describes a molar of a member of the genus Sus from the Villafranchian strata from the Taurida Cave (Crimea), and interpret the rarity of this finding as consistent with a decline in number rather than a complete disappearance of suids in Eastern Europe and Western Asia during the interval from 1.8 to 1.2 million years ago.
- A study on the morphological variation of the astragalus in extant and extinct ruminants is published by Orgebin et al. (2025).
- The first known plate/pat coprolites from the strata older than Pleistocene, likely produced by early ruminants, are described from the Miocene Harrison Formation (Nebraska, United States) by Hunt, Lucas & Retallack (2025), who name a new ichnotaxon Eobolitus milani.
- Evidence from the study of the digital endocast of Hoplitomeryx matthei, indicative of a brain morphology similar to those of bovids and likely of placement of this taxon within Pecora rather than Tragulina, is presented by Orgebin et al. (2025).
- Nascimento & Pires (2025) report evidence of impact of environmental changes, competition with proboscideans and predation by felines on the diversification of antilocaprids throughout the evolutionary history of the group.
- White & Mead (2025) describe fossil material from the late Pleistocene (Rancholabrean) strata from Térapa (Mexico), including remains Odocoileus virginianus couesi or a related deer ecomorph, and remains of three species of pronghorns interpreted as likely avoiding competition through resource partitioning.
- Marra (2025) reports the discovery of fossil material of Bohlinia attica from the Miocene strata from Cessaniti (Italy), representing the westernmost record of the species reported to date.
- Marra (2025) describes fossil material of Samotherium boissieri from the Miocene strata from Cessaniti, providing evidence of similarities of composition of Miocene faunas from Cessaniti and from the Greco-Iranian bioprovince.
- Laskos et al. (2025) describe two ossicones referrable to Bramatherium perimense from the Late Miocene Antonios Formation (Greece) and analyze the relationships between Bramatherium and Helladotherium, proposing the synonymy between them and recognizing only two distinct species, B. perimense and B. grande, in the former genus.
- Ratajczak-Skrzatek et al. (2025) describe fossil material of Megalovis latifrons and Metacervocerus rhenanus from the Črnotiče Quarry (Slovenia), providing evidence of presence of both taxa in the southern part of Central Europe during the Early Pleistocene.
- Evidence from the study of tooth enamel of Pleistocene cervids and bovids from Southeast Asia, interpreted as indicative of dietary shifts of chitals, Eld's deers, bantengs and gaurs that were likely related to habitat shift from open environments to forests, as well as indicating that extant wild water buffaloes and sambar deers have more restricted diets and habitat compared to Pleistocene ones, is presented by Shaikh, Bocherens & Suraprasit (2025).
- A study on tooth histology and growth of Procervulus ginsburgi is published by Cuccu et al. (2025).
- The first fossil material of Dicrocerus parviceros found outside France is reported from the middle Miocene strata in the Madrid Basin (Spain) by Azanza et al. (2025), who also identify fossil material of D. elegans in the Calatayud-Daroca Basin.
- Samuels et al. (2025) describe fossil material of Eocoileus gentryorum from the Gray Fossil Site (Tennessee, United States), and interpret the studied cervid as occupying similar niches to extant members of the genus Odocoileus.
- Wang et al. (2025) describe a new skull of "Nipponicervus" longdanensis from the Pleistocene strata from Longdan (Gansu, China), and assign this species to the genus Metacervocerus.
- Kessler et al. (2025) interpret Torontoceros hypogaeus as a probable distinct species within the genus Odocoileus on the basis of the study of ancient DNA.
- Kuo et al. (2025) study the anatomy of the American mountain deer, interpret it as a member of the genus Navahoceros that was distinct from Odocoileus and more closely related to the reindeer, and argue that the studied deer was not a specialized rock climber; Kuo & Prothero (2025) report evidence of different growth patterns of bones of forelimbs and hindlimbs of American mountain deer specimens from the San Josecito Cave (Nuevo León, Mexico).
- Van der Made et al. (2025) describe a reindeer tooth from the Galería site at Atapuerca (Spain), representing the southernmost record of a reindeer in Eurasia during Marine Isotope Stage 8.
- Canteri et al. (2025) reconstruct reindeer population dynamics throughout the past 21,000 years on the basis of the fossil record and ancient DNA, and argue that traits which enabled reindeer survival throughout the past environmental changes will no be sufficient to buffer reindeer against population declines from expected climate warming.
- Parparousi et al. (2025) describe fossil material of Pseudodama vallonnetensis from the Pleistocene strata from Cal Guardiola (Vallès-Penedès Basin, Spain), and review the biogeography of Dama-like deer in Europe during the Pleistocene.
- Evidence of delayed skeletal maturity in members of the genus Candiacervus (regardless of their body size) compared to the European fallow deer and similar-sized mainland deer is presented by Snoodijk et al. (2025).
- Aftab et al. (2025) describe new fossils of Mio-Pliocene bovids from the Middle Siwalik Subgroup (Pakistan), providing new information on the anatomy of Selenoportax vexillarius, Tragoportax punjabicus and Pachyportax latidens.
- A study on tooth wear in bovids from the Ethiopian fossil sites in the Lee Adoyta basin and the Maka'amitalu basin, indicating that the studied bovids were primarily grazers and indicative of wide availability of grasses in the studied areas during the Pliocene-Pleistocene transition, is published by Kirkpatrick et al. (2025).
- Malherbe et al. (2025) study the morphology of metacarpals and metatarsals of bovids from the Pleistocene Koobi Fora Formation (Kenya), interpreted as indicating that the studied bovids (and early hominins from the same formation) lived in the area dominated by open habitats throughout the Early Pleistocene.
- A study on the dietary preferences of bovids from Cradle of Humankind (South Africa), as indicated by tooth wear, is published by Malherbe et al. (2025), who interpret tooth wear in the studied bovids as indicating that there was no abrupt environmental shift in the studied area from woodlands to grasslands around 1.7 million years ago.
- Wang et al. (2025) report the discovery of new skull of "Gazella" nihensis from the Pliocene strata of the Zeku Composite Foreland Basin (China), preserving evidence of morphology is distinct from most other members of Antilopina.
- Xu & Shi (2025) describe fossil material of Antilospira cf. robusta from the Pleistocene strata of the Linxia Basin (Dongxiang Autonomous County, Gansu), representing the first known record of Antilospira in northwestern China.
- Bai et al. (2025) describe fossil material of Pliotragus cf. ardeus from the Pleistocene strata from the Xinyaozi locality (China), representing the first record of a member of the genus Pliotragus from eastern Asia.
- Costeur et al. (2025) describe the anatomy of the bony labyrinth of Myotragus balearicus.
- Jin et al. (2025) study the composition of the steppe bison diet as indicated by plant material in the intestinal tract of a specimen discovered at the Alazeya river bank in the Kolyma Lowland (Sakha Republic, Russia) in 2009, and report evidence indicating that the studied individual lived in a grassland composed of saline meadows, steppes and tundra.
- Evidence from study of ancient DNA of bovines from the Denisova Cave and other sites in western and southern Siberian sector of mid-latitude Asia, providing evidence of diversity of bovines (including bisons, aurochs and a previously unknown bovine lineage sister to but distinct from yaks) in the studied area during the Pleistocene, is presented by Gilardet et al. (2025).
- Fossil material of Brachyhyops neimongolensis representing the first confirmed record of Brachyhyops is described from the Eocene strata in Jeminay (Xinjiang, China) by Yu et al. (2025).
- Evidence of occlusion between upper canine teeth and canine-like first lower premolars rather than with incisor-like lower canines is reported in Masillabune martini from the Messel Formation (Germany) by Koenigswald, Lehmann & Wappler (2025).
- Purported mandible of the hippopotamus reported from the lower Pleistocene strata of the Yıldırımlı Formation (Turkey) by Tuna (1988) is reinterpreted as the earliest record of Hippopotamus antiquus from Anatolia reported to date by Tütenk & Mayda (2025).
- Evidence from the study of a mandible of Hippopotamus antiquus from the Middle Pleistocene strata from Mosbach (Germany) and other Pleistocene specimens, interpreted as indicative of decrease in body size in Middle Pleistocene H. antiquus compared to Early Pleistocene specimens, is presented by Martino et al. (2025).
- Description of the cranial anatomy of the Cypriot pygmy hippopotamus is published by Lyras et al. (2025).
- Martino et al. (2025) identify a mandible of the hippopotamus from the Amoroso Cave (Sicily, Italy), and interpret the hippopotamid fossil record from Sicily as indicative of presence of two taxa during the Pleistocene (the hippopotamus and Hippopotamus pentlandi).
- Evidence from the study of ancient DNA of hippopotamids from fossil localities in the Upper Rhine Graben (Germany), indicative of genetic ties of Late Pleistocene hippopotamus from Europe and extant African hippopotamus, is presented by Arnold et al. (2025), who also report evidence from radiocarbon dating of hippopotamids remains indicative of presence of the hippopotamus in southwestern Germany during the Marine Isotope Stage 3.
- Bouaziz et al. (2025) study the morphology of the anterior teeth of Indohyus indirae, and interpret the studied teeth as forming a grasping device used to capture preys, similar to teeth of stem cetaceans.

=== Carnivorans ===
Name	Novelty	Status	Authors	Age	Type locality	Country	Notes	Images
Amphicyon zhinu	Sp. nov		Farjand et al.	Miocene		China		
Bonisictis	Gen. et comb. nov	Valid	Morales et al.	Oligocene		France	A member of Musteloidea belonging to the family Amphictidae. The type species is "Viverra (Amphictis)" ambigua Gervais (1872); genus also includes "Plesictis" milloquensis Helbing (1928).	
Circamustela bhapralensis	Sp. nov	Valid	Sankhyan et al.	Pliocene	Dhok Pathan Formation	India	A member of the family Mustelidae belonging to the subfamily Guloninae.	
Civettictis vulpidens	Sp. nov	Valid	Churcher et al.	Pliocene	Varswater Formation	South Africa	A member of the family Viverridae, a species of Civettictis.	
Huntictis	Gen. et sp. nov		De Bonis, Gardin & Escarguel	Oligocene	Quercy Phosphorites Formation	France	An early member of Musteloidea. The type species is H. minima.	
Huracan borissiaki	Sp. nov.	Valid	Lopatin	Miocene	Kosyakino	Russia (Stavropol Krai)	A bear (Ursidae, Ailuropodinae, Agriotheriini). Although not registered in ZooBank, the printed issue of journal was available in December 2025 latest.	
Icaphoca	Gen. et sp. nov	Valid	Dewaele & de Muizon	Miocene	Pisco Formation	Peru	A monachine seal. Genus includes new species I. choristodon.	
Ictonyx harrisoni	Sp. nov	Valid	Werdelin & Fourvel	Plio-Pleistocene		Tanzania	A species of Ictonyx.	
Mioparadoxurus micros	Sp. nov		Abbas et al.	Miocene	Dhok Pathan Formation	Pakistan	A member of the family Viverridae belonging to the subfamily Paradoxurinae.	
Panthera uncia lusitana	Ssp. nov		Jiangzuo et al.	Pleistocene		Portugal	A subspecies of the snow leopard.	
Parakichechia	Gen. et sp. nov		Abbas et al.	Miocene	Chinji Formation	Pakistan	A member of the family Viverridae belonging to the subfamily Paradoxurinae or Hemigalinae. Genus includes new species P. sikandari.	
Paratethyphoca	Gen. et sp. nov	Valid	Otriazhyi et al.	Miocene		Moldova	An earless seal belonging to the subfamily Phocinae. The type species is P. libera.	
Prionodon hualongensis	Sp. nov	Valid	Jiangzuo et al.	Pleistocene		China	An Asiatic linsang.	
Rothictis	Gen. et comb. nov	Valid	Morales et al.	Miocene		Germany	A member of the family Ailuridae belonging to the subfamily Magerictinae. The type species is "Amphictis" wintershofensis Roth in Heizmann & Morlo (1994); genus also includes "Amphictis" prolongata Morlo (1996).	
Sivaonyx sarwari	Sp. nov	Valid	Mahmood et al.	Miocene	Dhok Pathan Formation	Pakistan	An otter.	
Taotienimravus	Gen. et sp. nov		Jiangzuo et al.	Oligocene	Qingshuiying Formation	China	A nimravid. The type species is T. songi.	
Urva fanchangensis	Sp. nov		Jiangzuo et al.	Pleistocene		China	A mongoose, a species of Urva.	
Vishnuictis plectilodous	Sp. nov	Valid	Sankhyan et al.	Pliocene	Dhok Pathan Formation	India	A member of the family Viverridae.	

==== Carnivoran research ====
- Evidence from the study of extant and extinct carnivorans, indicating of the morphology of the mandible is correlated with functional ecology in carnivorans, is presented by Salcido & Polly (2025).
- Schwab, Figueirido & Jones (2025) find that the study of the morphology of individual vertebrae can provide clearer insights into the locomotion of carnivorans than the study of multiple vertebrae or entire regions of the spinal column, report evidence of contrasting signals of locomotor mode and ecology of the dire wolf in the morphology of the vertebrae along its spine, and argue that the dire wolf likely practiced endurance-based pursuit as well as in opportunistic scavenging.
- Evidence of increased skeletal diversifications of carnivorans in the aftermath of extinctions at the Eocene-Oligocene transition and after the Mid-Miocene Climate Transition is presented by Law, Hlusko & Tseng (2025).
- Castellanos (2025) studies the diversity of North American carnivorans adapted to different types of hunting during the Eocene and Oligocene, and reports evidence of increase of proportion of ambush predators during the early Oligocene, and of cursorial predators during the Arikareean.
- A study on the ecology of Pliocene carnivorans from the Hadar Formation (Ethiopia), based on data from carbon and oxygen isotope composition of tooth enamel, is published by Robinson et al. (2025), who find evidence of only limited partitioning of dietary niches of Homotherium and Crocuta venustula.
- Tucker & Farlow (2025) study the composition of the assemblage of Blancan carnivorans from the Pipe Creek Sinkhole (Indiana, United States).
- A study on the composition of the early Pleistocene carnivoran assemblage from Chlum 4S (Czech Republic) is published by Marciszak & Wagner (2025).
- Todorov & Alroy (2025) report evidence of a strong relationship between high basal metabolic rate, diurnality and extinction risk in Pleistocene and Holocene terrestrial carnivorans, probably resulting from increased exposure to humans and reduced recovery capacity.
- Le Verger et al. (2025) describe the anatomy of the skull of Cynodictis lacustris.
- Tseng & Wang (2025) describe new fossil material of canids from the Miocene Monarch Mill Formation (Nevada, United States), providing evidence of presence of Cynarctus cf. C. saxatilis and Paracynarctus kelloggi in the Eastgate Local Fauna.
- Lopezalles (2025) provides body mass estimates for the dire wolf, Hesperocyon gregarius and Phlaocyon multicuspus inferred from 3D geometric morphometrics of their limb bones.
- Lopezalles (2025) reports evidence indicating that maximum running speed of extant canids can be estimated on the basis of the study of their humerus shape, and provides estimates of maximum running speed for the dire wolf, Hesperocyon gregarius, Phlaocyon multicuspus and a fossil coyote.
- Savvidou & Kostopoulos (2025) describe new fossil material of Villafranchian canids from the Dafnero-3 site (Greece), and identify the first fossil material of Nyctereutes vulpinus from southeastern Europe reported to date.
- A study on the anatomy and affinities of Eucyon monticinensis, based on data from a new specimen from the Miocene strata from Verduno (Italy), is published by Azzarà et al. (2025), who interpret Eucyon debonisi as a junior synonym of E. monticinensis.
- Peri et al. (2025) simulate the bite of Eucyon davisi, and interpret their finding as consistent with ecology similar to those of extant members of the genus Lupulella.
- Ruiz et al. (2025) compare the morphology of Speothos pacivorus and the extant bush dog, and support the classification of the two species as distinct.
- Baryshnikov et al. (2025) describe new fossil material of Xenocyon lycaonoides from the Pleistocene strata in eastern Siberia (Russia), and interpret the morphology of the mandible of the studied canid as similar to those of smaller hypercarnivorous canids such as the dhole or the African wild dog, in spite of the greater size of the mandible of X. lycaonoides.
- Hill et al. (2025) describe new fossil material of the dire wolf from two localities in southwestern Iowa and revise the dire wolf material from the Peccary Cave in Arkansas; the authors also revise Canis mississippiensis and interpret it as a junior synonym of the wolf.
- Jensen-Seaman et al. (2025) review the results and ethical aspects of breeding of genetically modified wolves purported to replicate the phenotype of the dire wolf by the Colossal Biosciences Dire Wolf Project.
- Bartolini-Lucenti et al. (2025) identify fossil material of Canis arnensis and Canis etruscus at the Pleistocene Fonelas P-1 site (Spain), expanding known geographical and temporal range of the former species, and argue that co-occurrence of the two species was possible because of their ecological niche partitioning.
- Runge et al. (2025) identify two permafrost-preserved Pleistocene canids from Tumat (Russia) as littermates, and report evidence of their diverse diet that included woolly rhinoceros, but find no evidence linking the studied canids to human activities.
- New information on the morphology and ecology of Indarctos anthracitis, based on the study of known and new fossil material, is presented by Faggi et al. (2025).
- A study on mitogenomes of specimens of Arctodus simus is published by Salis et al. (2025), who find no evidence of genetic differences compatible with the previously proposed subspecies, but report probable evidence of sexual dimorphism.
- A study on the mandibular morphology of Ursus minimus, interpreted as consistent with omnivorous diet, is published by van Heteren (2025).
- Van Heteren & Luft (2025) study the evolution of dental development in bears, and report evidence of at least two deviations from the inhibitory cascade model proposed by Kavanagh, Evans & Jernvall (2007), resulting in a shift towards a disproportionately large second molar related to a shift towards omnivory between Ursus boeckhi and Ursus minimus, and in a shift towards a disproportionately large third molar related to a shift towards herbivory between Ursus minimus and Ursus deningeri.
- Marciszak et al. (2025) document the presence of fossil material of two bear taxa in the Pleistocene strata from the Tunel Wielki cave (Poland), including abundant fossils of Ursus deningeri hercynicus and fossil material of Ursus arctos taubachensis which might represent one of the earliest records of this taxon from Europe.
- A study on dietary preferences of cave bears from the southeastern regions of Europe, as indicated by tooth wear, is published by Duñó-Iglesias et al. (2025), who report evidence of dietary flexibility of the studied bears and adaptations of their foraging strategies to local environmental conditions.
- Evidence from stable isotope analysis of bone collagen, indicative of lifetime dietary variation in Late Pleistocene cave bears from the Romanian Carpathians likely resulting from foraging experience, is presented by Meleg et al. (2025).
- Gimranov, Zykov & Kosintsev (2025) study the wear of incisors of Ursus rossicus and Ursus kanivetz kanivetz from Pleistocene deposits in the Middle and Southern Urals, and interpret their findings as indicative of a distinctive feeding behavior of U. rossicus, involving feeding on coarser vegetation and more frequent feeding on plant roots compared to other cave and brown bears.
- Albrecht et al. (2025) report evidence from the study of extant bears and from stable isotope analyses of collagen from remains of fossil bears, indicating that bears in general change their diets in response to changes of resource availability and climate, and that European brown bears specifically shifted to more herbivorous diets at the onset of the Holocene, more likely in response to enhanced resource availability than as a result of extinction of cave bears.
- Wang et al. (2025) describe fossil material of Promephitis cf. parvus from the Baogeda Ula Formation (China), and interpret this finding as supporting the assessment of the fossil record from the studied formation as reaching to the early Late Miocene.
- Fossil material of the youngest European member of the genus Promephitis reported to date is described from the Pliocene (Ruscinian–Villafranchian) strata from the Lucești locality (Moldova) by Araslanov et al. (2025).
- Revision of the fossil material of mustelids from the Early Pleistocene site of Schernfeld (Germany) is published by Marciszak & Rössner (2025).
- Adrian et al. (2025) study the morphology of limb elements of Siamogale melilutra, interpreted as consistent with behaviors similar to those of extant members of the genus Aonyx.
- New fossil material of Lutra simplicidens is described from the Pleistocene strata from the Corton site (United Kingdom) and Żabia Cave (Poland) by Marciszak & Bower (2025).
- Tseng (2025) revises dental and jaw materials of leptarctine mustelids from the collections of the University of California Museum of Paleontology, and reports the first evidence of presence of Leptarctus wortmani in Nevada (Esmeralda and Thousand Creek formations).
- Fernández-Reyes et al. (2025) describe new fossil material of members of the genus Eomellivora from the Miocene strata from the Shouyang Basin (China), including the first cranial material of E. wimani described since the initial description of the genus and species.
- Tseng & Wang (2025) describe fossil material of mustelids Sthenictis dolichops (the youngest record of the species reported to date) and Hoplictis cf. H. grangerensis and ailurids Alopecocyon leardi and Alopecocyon cf. A. parverratis from the Miocene Caliente and Green Valley formations (California, United States), providing evidence of continued presence of habitats suitable for members of these immigrant carnivoran lineages along the western coast of North America during the Clarendonian.
- New information on the anatomy of Monachopsis pontica, based on the study of new fossil material from the Miocene localities in Crimea, is provided by Otriazhyi et al. (2025).
- Tsubamoto, Kunimatsu & Nakatsukasa (2025) describe fossil material of a mongoose (cf. Galerella sp.) from the Miocene Nakali Formation (Kenya), and consider the generic placement of purported fossils of members of the genus Herpestes smaller than the Egyptian mongoose to be uncertain, arguing that fossils from Langebaanweg and Lemudong'o might belong to members of the genus Galerella, while Miocene fossils from the Siwaliks of Pakistan might belong to a member of the genus Urva.
- Paparizos et al. (2025) describe new fossil material of Hyaenictis graeca from the Miocene strata in Greece and revise fossils attributed to this species in earlier studies.
- Khantemirov et al. (2025) redescribe remains of Hyaena eldarica reported from the upper Miocene site of Eldari (Azerbaijan), and reinterpret them as the first known fossil material of Dinocrocuta gigantea from Caucasus.
- Revision of the fossil material of Plioviverrops faventinus from the type locality of Cava Monticino (Italy) and a study on the affinities of the species is published by Loddi, Madurell-Malapeira & Bartolini-Lucenti (2025).
- Martínez-Navarro et al. (2025) revise the hyaenid fossil material from Dmanisi (Georgia), and assign the studied specimens to the single species Pachycrocuta brevirostris.
- Nikolskaia, Rabinovich & Sotnikova (2025) identify fossil material of Pachycrocuta brevirostris from the Pleistocene strata from the localities of Zasukhino-3 (Buryatia, Russia) and Nalaikha (Mongolia) and study the evolution of lower teeth of P. brevirostris, recognizing two distinct, successive tooth morphotypes.
- Liu et al. (2025) revise purported fossil material of the spotted hyena from cave or fissure fillings near Huainan (Anhui, China) described by Tseng et al. (2008), reinterpret the mandibular fragment from the probable Middle Pleistocene strata from the Dadingshan site as belonging to cf. Crocuta ultima and the fossil material from the probable Early Pleistocene strata from the Xiliexi site as belonging to Pachycrocuta perrieri, revise the morphological differences between Crocuta and Pachycrocuta, and interpret the fossil material of ruminants from the Xiliexi site (with is predominance of Axis shansius and a significant proportion of juvenile individuals) as indirect evidence that P. perrieri possessed active hunting ability.
- Salari et al. (2025) describe new fossil remains of cave hyenas from Grotta Guattari (Lazio, Italy), including some of the largest specimens from Western Europe reported to date.
- Flink et al. (2025) study the endocranium of a specimen of the spotted hyena from the Pleistocene strata from Megenta (Ethiopia), report that the brain of the studied individual was indistinguishable from those of extant spotted hyenas, and interpret this finding as indicating that sociality of spotted hyenas dated back to at least 350,000 years ago.
- Tseng & Chatar (2025) provide evidence indicating that the unique jaw torus of Nimravus increased bite force and efficiency.
- Porto, de Oliveira & Fiedler (2025) study changes speciation and extinction rates and changes of body mass of felids throughout their evolutionary history, interpreted as influenced by major environmental changes.
- Madurell-Malapeira (2025) reviews the fossil record of Pliocene and Pleistocene felids from Europe.
- Sotnikova & Sizov (2025) describe fossil material of Amphimachairodus horribilis from the Miocene (Turolian) strata of the Khyargas Nuur Formation, representing the first record of the species from Mongolia, interpret Amphimachairodus irtyshensis as a taxon distinct from A. horribilis, and consider both A. horribilis and A. irtyshensis to be possible close relatives of Adeilosmilus kabir.
- A study on the microstructure of hairs of the frozen mummy of a cub of Homotherium latidens described by Lopatin et al. (2024) is published by Chernova, Klimovsky & Protopopov (2025).
- Lopatin et al. (2025) reconstruct the habitat of the frozen mummy of a cub of Homotherium latidens described by Lopatin et al. (2024) on the basis of organic microfossils and phytoliths from the site of the discovery of the mummy, providing evidence that the environment of this individual included floodplain mature larch forest and mesic sedge-grass-forb meadows, and interpret this finding as possible evidence that Homotherium lived in areas with a mosaic of woodlands and grasslands to reduce competition with cave lions.
- Isolated teeth interpreted as belonging to a dwarf form of Megantereon, possibly distinct from known species within this genus, are described from the Pleistocene strata from Java (Indonesia) by Jiangzuo et al. (2025).
- Evidence from the study of a new skull of Megantereon inexpectatus from Bajiazui (Qingyang, China) and several skulls of Megantereon nihowanensis from Longdan (Gansu, China), supporting direct ancestor-descendant relationship between the two species, is presented by Guo et al. (2025).
- A study on feeding behavior of specimens of Smilodon gracilis and Smilodon fatalis from Florida, as indicated by their tooth wear, is published by Pardo-Judd & DeSantis (2025), who interpret the studied species as generalist predators throughout the Pleistocene, with differences in the diet of S. gracilis during glacial and interglacial periods.
- Fossil material of Smilodon fatalis representing the southernmost record of the species reported to date is described from the Lujanian Dolores Formation (Uruguay) by Manzuetti et al. (2025).
- Nascimento & Pires (2025) link the diversification dynamics of machairodontines to the availability of their prey, and link the extinction of machairodontines to reduction of richness of their probable prey.
- The first well-documented and preserved fossil material of Lynx issiodorensis from northeastern Caucasus is described from the Pleistocene strata from the Muhkai 2 site (Dagestan, Russia) by Lyubimov, Iltsevich & Sablin (2025).
- Jimenez et al. (2025) study the age of members of the late Pleistocene Iberian lynx populations from the Terrasses de la Riera dels Canyars and Cova del Gegant sites (Spain), reporting evidence of two distinct mortality profiles, and interpret their findings as consistent with the idea that different populations of the Iberian lynx were adapted to different regional settings.
- Koufos et al. (2025) describe feline fossil material from the Pleistocene strata from the Dafnero-3 site, including fossil material of Lynx issiodorensis and the first record of Puma pardoides from Greece.
- New fossil material of Panthera gombaszoegensis is described from the Pleistocene strata from the Corton site (United Kingdom) and from the Rogóżka Cave (Poland) by Marciszak & Bower (2025).
- Prat-Vericat et al. (2025) describe fossil material of leopards from the Pleistocene strata from the Eastern Pyrenean sites of Grotte de la Carrière (France), Cova 120, Cova s' Espasa and Tut de Fustanyà (Spain), and report evidence of increase of body mass of the studied leopards throughout the Pleistocene, reduced sexual dimorphism compared to modern leopards, and anatomical convergences with snow leopards.
- Jiangzuo et al. (2025) describe a skull of Panthera spelaea from the Pleistocene strata of the Salawusu Formation in northern China, belonging to an individual larger than members of the Beringian subspecies Panthera spelaea vereshchagini.
- Rodrigo & Bohingamuwa (2025) revise the type material of Panthera leo sinhaleyus from the Pleistocene strata from Sri Lanka, and report evidence of presence of dental characteristics intermediate between those of modern lions and Middle Pleistocene Panthera spelaea.

=== Chiropterans ===
Name	Novelty	Status	Authors	Age	Type locality	Country	Notes	Images
Madanycteris	Gen. et sp. nov	Valid	Samonds et al.	Miocene		Madagascar	A member of the family Hipposideridae. Genus includes new species M. razana.	
Rhinophylla garbogginii	Sp. nov		Salles et al.	Quaternary		Brazil	A species of Rhinophylla.	

==== Chiropteran research ====
- Losco & Martin (2025) describe a specimen of Cuvierimops sp. from the Oligocene (Rupelian) strata from the Céreste site (France), preserving evidence of adaptations to fast and enduring flight, and interpret the studied individual as likely hunting in open area of the Oligocene lake system of Céreste.
- Cailleux, van den Hoek Ostende & Joniak (2025) describe bat faunas from the Miocene (MN9 to MN11) strata from the Borský Svätý Jur, Studienka A and Krásno sites (Slovakia), reporting evidence of presence of a diverse fauna including six distinct species at the Krásno site.
- Morgan, McDonald & Czaplewski (2025) interpret evidence from the fossil record and genomic data as indicating that vampire bats evolved in South America in the Miocene, and argue that they might have originally fed on the blood of large-bodied South American mammals such as large xenarthrans and South American native ungulates, that the dispersal of vampire bats into North America resulted from the dispersal of the mammals they preferentially fed on, and that the extinction of Desmodus stocki and Desmodus draculae might have been linked to late Pleistocene extinctions of mammalian megafauna.

=== Eulipotyphlans ===
Name	Novelty	Status	Authors	Age	Type locality	Country	Notes	Image
Dinosorex kaelini	Sp. nov		Cailleux et al.	Miocene		Switzerland		
Dobenflorinia	Nom. nov	Valid	Hutterer et al.	Miocene		Germany	A shrew; a replacement name for Soricella Doben-Florin (1964).	
Isterlestes	Gen. et sp. nov	Valid	Cailleux, van den Hoek Ostende & Joniak	Miocene		Slovakia	A shrew. The type species is I. aenigmaticus.	
Vulcanoscaptor	Gen. et sp. nov		Linares-Martín in Linares-Martín et al.	Pliocene		Spain	A mole belonging to the tribe Scalopini. The type species is V. ninoti.	

==== Eulipotyphlan research ====
- Turvey et al. (2025) study the variation of the body size of the Puerto Rican nesophontes throughout its evolutionary history, reporting evidence of increase of body size after the Last Glacial Maximum, as well as evidence of association of the older, smaller morph with savanna-type habitats and association of the more recent, larger morph with forest habitats.
- Furió et al. (2025) reinterpret purported treeshrew Sivatupaia ramnagarensis as more likely to be a white-toothed shrew of uncertain generic placement.
- An almost complete skull of Asoriculus gibberodon is described from the Pliocene strata from the Jradzor site (Armenia) by Bert et al. (2025), who interpret the anatomy of the studied specimen as closer to the anatomy of skull of terrestrial shrews rather than semi-aquatic taxa.
- Li, Li & Wang (2025) describe new fossil material of Exallerix pustulatus from the Oligocene strata in China, and revise the fossil record of brachyericine hedgehogs in China.
- Cailleux et al. (2025) describe new fossil material of Miocene hedgehogs from the Kohfidisch site (Austria), and interpret the composition of the studied assemblage as consistent with spread of a few large hedgehog forms throughout Europe during the Turolian.

=== Perissodactyls ===
Name	Novelty	Status	Authors	Age	Type locality	Country	Notes	Images
Cormohipparion sofularensis	Sp. nov	Valid	Kahya Parıldar et al.	Miocene (Turolian)		Turkey		
Epiaceratherium itjilik	Sp. nov		Fraser et al.	Miocene	Haughton Formation	Canada (Nunavut)		
Turpanotherium qiui	Sp. nov		Lu & Deng	Oligocene	Qingshuiying Formation	China	A member of the family Paraceratheriidae.	

==== Perissodactyl research ====
- Evidence indicating that Eocene lophiodontids from southern France were folivores and browsers rather than frugivores, as well as indicative of adaptation of Lophiodon lautricense to eating harder and more abrasive food compared to earlier lophiodontids, is presented by Hullot et al. (2025).
- Kampouridis, Kyriakouli & de Souza Ferreira (2025) describe a pathological fusion of proximal and medial phalanges in a chalicotheriine specimen from the Miocene strata from Höwenegg (Germany), mirroring the non-pathological fusion of phalanges seen in schizotheriines.
- Quan et al. (2025) report the first discovery of a mammal fossil (partial mandible of Schizotherium ordosium) from the Oligocene Tala Formation (Gansu, China).
- A study on changes of proportion of limb bones of Moropus elatus during their growth is published by Potter, Prothero & Welsh (2025).
- Pandolfi et al. (2025) describe new fossil material of Tapirus priscus from the Vallesian strata of the Vallès-Penedès Basin (Spain), providing new information on the anatomy of members of the species and extending its known chronostratigraphic range in Western Europe.
- Li et al. (2025) report the discovery of postcranial skeletal elements of Paraceratherium huangheense from the Oligocene Xianshuihe Formation (China).
- A study on the growth of limb bones of Menoceras arikarense and Teleoceras proterum is published by Santos et al. (2025).
- Kampouridis et al. (2025) compare the anatomy of the postcranial skeletons of Chilotherium persiae, C. habereri and C. schlosseri.
- A study on adaptations to different locomotory types in limbs of Prosantorhinus germanicus, Lartetotherium sansaniense and Plesiaceratherium fahlbuschi from the Miocene locality Sandelzhausen (Germany) is published by Schellhorn (2025).
- Paterson et al. (2025) recover partial sequences of enamel proteins of a member of the genus Epiaceratherium from the Miocene strata of the Haughton Formation (Nunavut, Canada), and recover the studied specimen as belonging to a rhinocerotid lineage that diverged before the Rhinocerotinae–Elasmotheriinae split.
- Purported tooth fragments of Brachypotherium sp. from the late Miocene strata in Japan is reinterpreted as fossil material of an indeterminate member of Aceratheriinae by Handa & Taru (2025).
- A study on the anatomy of skull and teeth of Chilotherium schlosseri is published by Svorligkou et al. (2025).
- Evidence from the study of carbon, oxygen and strontium isotope composition of tooth enamel of Teleoceras major from the Miocene Ashfall Fossil Beds (Nebraska, United States), interpret as indicative of limited mobility of the studied rhinocerotids, is presented by Ward, Crowley & Secord (2025).
- Pandolfi, Cerdeño & Antoine (2025) study the variability of the cranial anatomy of the narrow-nosed rhinoceros, and argue that there is no evidence supporting the differentiation of subspecies within this species at morphological or chronological level.
- Revision of the rhinocerotid material from the Lower Pleistocene localities in northern Greece is published by Chitoglou et al. (2025).
- The longest horn of a woolly rhinoceros reported to date is described from the permafrost in the Sakha Republic (Russia) by Boeskorov et al. (2025), who determine the horn to belong to oldest known woolly rhinoceros individual and probably to a female individual.
- A study on the phylogenetic relationships and evolutionary history of extant and fossil rhinocerotids is published by Borrani et al. (2025).
- Fossils of late Miocene or early Pliocene perissodactyls, including Sivalhippus platyodus, Proboscidipparion pater, Shansirhinus ringstroemi and an indeterminate rhinocerotine, representing the first confirmed record of the Jingxing Hipparion fauna from the eastern foothills of the Taihang Mountains (China), are described by Zhang et al. (2025).
- Solounias & Gerard (2025) compare the preorbital fossae of extant domesticated horses, Merychippus insignis, Pliohippus mirabilis and Protohippus pernix, and interpret the extinct equids as likely grazing less than modern horses.
- Cirilli & Bernor (2025) revise Pliohippus mirabilis and place this species at the base of the Neogene radiation of North American members of the tribe Equini.
- A study on the ecology of Equus neogeus and Hippidion principale from the Argentine Pampas is published by Bellinzoni, Valenzuela & Prado (2025), who report evidence of greater dietary flexibility of E. neogeus and greater vulnerability of H. principale to environmental changes.
- Revision of the morphological variation in the fossil material of North American caballine horses is published by Eisenmann, Barrón-Ortiz & Montellano-Ballesteros (2025).
- Weingarten et al. (2025) reconstruct largely complete mitochondrial genomes of two specimens of Equus mosbachensis from the Schöningen site (Germany).
- A study on the taxonomy of horses from the Farneta, Selvella and Pietrafitta localities from the Villafranchian Farneta Faunal Unit (Italy) is published by Borchi et al. (2025).
- Running Horse Collin et al. (2025) report evidence indicating that horses from Alaska and northern Yukon repeatedly crossed Bering land bridge during the last glacial interval, and that climate and environmental changes during the late Pleistocene restricted mobility and food availability for American horses, impeding their population growth.
- Eisenmann & Vasiliev (2025) describe two skulls of Equus ovodovi from the Pleistocene strata from Khakassia (Russia), providing new information on the anatomy of members of this species.
- Kusliy et al. (2025) study the mitochondrial genetic diversity of the Pleistocene Equus ovodovi from southern Siberia, providing evidence of greater maternal genetic closeness between Pleistocene populations from Siberia and Holocene populations from northeast China than between Pleistocene populations from Siberia and China; the authors also extend known geographical range of the studied horse up to 56° north latitude, and determine that E. ovodovi lived in Siberia at least until 15,000–11,000 years ago.
- Evidence from the study of isotopic composition of remains of Equus ovodovi from northern China, interpreted as indicative of a long-term dietary transition in the studied horse, is presented by Sheng et al. (2025).
- Evidence from the study of genomic data from remains of horses living in the Iberian Peninsula throughout the last 26,800 years, indicative of presence of a local wild horse lineage that lasted until Late Iron Age, is presented by Lira Garrido et al. (2025).

=== Other laurasiatherians ===
Name	Novelty	Status	Authors	Age	Type locality	Country	Notes	Images
Bastetodon	Gen. et comb. nov		Al-Ashqar et al.	Oligocene	Jebel Qatrani Formation	Egypt	A member of Hyaenodonta belonging to the family Hyainailouridae. The type species is "Pterodon" syrtos.	
Hyaenodon lingbaoensis	Sp. nov		Li et al.	Eocene	Chuankou Formation	China		
Ichhutherium	Gen. et sp. nov	Valid	Armella et al.	Miocene (Burdigalian)	Potrero Grande Formation	Argentina	A mesotheriid notoungulate. The type species is I. wayra.	
Itaboraitemnus	Gen. et sp. nov		Castro, Bergqvist & García-López	Paleogene (Itaboraian)	Itaboraí Formation	Brazil	A notoungulate belonging to the group Toxodontia. Genus includes new species I. macrodon.	
Maizotemnus	Gen. et sp. nov		Fernández et al.	Paleocene-Eocene (Thanetian–Ypresian)	Maíz Gordo Formation	Argentina	A notoungulate belonging to the group Toxodontia. Genus includes new species M. archaeios.	
Sekhmetops	Gen. et comb. nov		Al-Ashqar et al.	Oligocene	Jebel Qatrani Formation	Egypt	A member of Hyaenodonta belonging to the family Hyainailouridae. The type species is "Pterodon" africanus, genus also includes "P." phiomensis.	S. phiomensis

==== Miscellaneous laurasiatherian research ====
- Zack, Rose & O'Leary (2025) describe new fossil material of Wyolestes iglesius from the Las Tetas de Cabra Formation (Mexico), W. apheles from the Willwood Formation and W. dioctes from the Wasatch Formation (Wyoming, United States), and study the phylogenetic affinities of the genus Wyolestes, recovering it as a member of Hyaenodonta.
- Weidtke et al. (2025) reconstruct the chewing cycle and probable diet of Lesmesodon edingeri.
- Evidence from the study of tooth wear of Dissacus praenuntius, interpreted as indicative of a dietary shift involving more bone consumption across the Paleocene–Eocene Thermal Maximum, is presented by Schwartz, DeSantis & Scott (2025).
- Asai et al. (2025) describe new fossil material of desmostylians from the Tonokita Formation, providing evidence of co-occurrence of members of the genera Neoparadoxia and Paleoparadoxia in Japan during the middle Miocene, and study the diversity patterns of desmostylians throughout their evolutionary history.
- Nara, Imai & Fujino (2025) describe a well-preserved feeding pit from the Miocene Shirahama Formation (Japan) assigned to the ichnotaxon Piscichnus waitemata, and interpret it as most likely produced by a large mammal feeding on benthic organisms (probably a desmostylian).
- Mulcahy, Constenius & Beard (2025) report the first discovery of fossil material of a uintathere from the Kishenehn Formation (Montana, United States), representing the northernmost record of the group in North America reported to date.
- Del Campo, Chimento & Agnolín (2025) describe a calcaneus of an indeterminate member of Panperissodactyla and a part of a humerus of an indeterminate eutherian with similarities to bones of archaic ungulates (both from the Paleocene Salamanca Formation, Argentina), providing evidence of early evolution of ungulates in South America.
- Van Orman et al. (2025) describe fossil material of a probable new uruguaytheriine astrapothere taxon from the Miocene strata of the Quebrada Honda Basin (Bolivia), and interpret early to middle Miocene astrapotheres from Bolivia as likely browsers with dietary habits similar to those of extant black rhinoceros.
- New didolodontid and litopterns fossil material, including the most complete mandibular fragment of Didolodus magnus recovered to date, is described from the Eocene Sarmiento Formation (Argentina) by Vera, Folino & Migliaro (2025).
- A study on the morphology of litoptern hindlimbs, providing evidence of similarities to rodents and even-toed ungulates and evidence of different adaptations for locomotion in macraucheniids and proterotheriids, is published by Lorente, Schmidt & Croft (2025).
- Lorente, Bond & Kramarz (2025) describe two partial hindlimbs of a small litoptern from the Eocene strata of the Sarmiento Formation (Argentina), likely from a lineage predating the divergence between proterotheriids and macraucheniids, and representing the most complete postcranial material of a litoptern from the pre-Deseadan strata reported to date.
- A study on the microstructure of enamel of postcanine teeth of Notiolofos arquinotiensis, Phoradiadius divortiensis and an indeterminate sparnotheriodontid from the Eocene La Meseta Formation (Antarctica) is published by Kalthoff, Gelfo & Mörs (2025).
- McGrath et al. (2025) describe new fossil material of litopterns from the Miocene strata from La Venta (Colombia), providing new information on the morphology of the deciduous teeth of Mesolicaphrium sanalfonense and on the lower adult dentition of Theosodon sp.
- Vera, Romano Muñoz & Krapovickas (2025) describe proterotheriid tracks from the Miocene strata of the Toro Negro and Huayquerías formations (Argentina), preserving evidence of coordinated group movement at the Toro Negro tracksite interpreted by the authors as consistent with social behavior and evidence of unrestricted group movement at the Huayquerías tracksite, and name a new ichnotaxon Okana andina.
- The most complete mandible of Oxyodontherium zeballosi reported to date is described from the Neogene strata in Kiyú (Uruguay) by Corona, Badín & Perea (2025), providing new information on the anatomy of members of the species and expanding its known geographical range.
- A study on toxodontid fossils from the Ribeira of Iguape Valley (Brazil) is published by Costa, Chahud & Okumura (2025), who identify a tooth likely representing the southernmost record of Mixotoxodon larensis reported to date, and identify cut marks on bones of Toxodon platensis.
- Medina-González & Moreno (2025) study adaptations for digging in the forelimb of Caraguatypotherium munozi, and report evidence of forelimb configurations that were functionally distinct from those of extant digging mammals.
- Medina-González (2025) compares the morphology of the astragali of Caraguatypotherium munozi and Trachytherus spegazzinianus, and reports evidence suggestive of ecological differences between the studied species and scansorial tendencies in C. munozi.
- Cerdeño et al. (2025) provide new information on changes of dentition of mesotheriid notoungulates during their ontogeny on the basis of the study of young specimens of Typotheriopsis chasicoensis from the Miocene strata from the Arroyo Chasicó locality (Argentina).
- New fossil material of Brachyhyops neimongolensis and the first fossil material of Eomoropus major from the Erlian Basin reported to date is described from the Eocene Shara Murun Formation (China) by Bai et al. (2025).
- A study on the ecology of Oligocene-Miocene ungulates from Oregon is published by Reuter et al. (2025), who report evidence of partitioning of food resources by the studied ungulates, and evidence of a shift to consumption of isotopically similar C_{3} plants after Middle Miocene Climatic Optimum.
- Evidence from the study of tooth enamel of Miocene antilocaprids, camelids and equids from the Dove Spring Formation, indicating that the studied ungulates selectively consumed C_{3} plants throughout the period of 8.5 million years in spite of expansion of C_{4} vegetation, is presented by Hardy et al. (2025).
- New fossil material of Percrocuta carnifex and members of nine artiodactyl species is described from the middle-late Miocene outcrops in the Chakwal District (Pakistan) by Samiullah et al. (2025).
- Wu et al. (2025) report the discovery of fossils of a new assemblage of late Miocene mammals from the Dongmen fossil site (Baode Formation; Gansu, China), including hyaenids, perissodactyls and artiodactyls.
- A study on dietary habits of ungulates living in northern part of the Iberian Peninsula during the Middle to Upper Palaeolithic Transition an on their environment, as indicated by tooth wear of individuals from the Covalejos cave (Cantabria, Spain), is published by Sanz-Royo, Berlioz & Marín-Arroyo (2025).
- Barakat et al. (2025) study the ecology of ungulates from the Late Pleistocene sites Roc de Marsal, Pech de l'Azé IV and Combe Grenal in southwestern France as indicated by sulfur, carbon and nitrogen isotope compositions of bone collagen extracted from their remains, interpreted as indicating that the studied ungulates occupied different areas of the landscape.
- Bertacchi et al. (2025) study the habitat of Late Pleistocene ungulates from the Kasitu Valley (Malawi) on the basin of strontium isotope composition of their remains, find no evidence of migratory behavior in members of extant migratory species, and interpret their findings as indicating that human foragers from the studied area hunted small bovids locally and hunted large prey near bodies of water and in the Afromontane grasslands to the southeast of the study area, with their prey likely available year-round.
- Evidence from the study of sedimentary ancient DNA, indicative of changes of distribution of marine mammals from northern Greenland throughout the Holocene, is presented by Schreiber et al. (2025).
- Evidence indicating that changes of diversity of artiodactyls, carnivorans and perissodactyls throughout the Cenozoic corresponded to paleoclimate states on multi-million-year timescales is presented by Bekeraitė et al. (2025).

== Xenarthrans ==
=== Cingulatans ===
Name	Novelty	Status	Authors	Age	Type locality	Country	Notes	Images
Clypeotherium mobilis	Sp. nov		Ciancio, Pujos & Cerdeño	Oligocene		Argentina	A glyptodont.	
Mendozaphractus	Gen. et sp. nov		Ciancio, Pujos & Cerdeño	Oligocene		Argentina	A member of the subfamily Euphractinae. Genus includes new species M. cumpuchu.	
Peltephilus quebradensis	Sp. nov		Ciancio, Pujos & Cerdeño	Oligocene		Argentina	A member of the family Peltephilidae.	

==== Cingulatan research ====
- A study on the morphology of the osteoderms of Quaternary pampatheriids and a revision of their taxonomy is published by Ferreira et al. (2025)
- A probable pampatheriid tooth is described from the Oligocene strata in Peru by Pujos et al. (2025), substantiating the presence of pampatheriids in western Amazonia during the Oligocene.
- New evidence of trauma-induced alterations of the body armor of glyptodont specimens is presented by Lima, Porpino & Ribeiro (2025).
- Lima, Porpino & Ribeiro (2025) identify first potential tungiasis cases in members of five genera of glyptodonts, and the first case of fungal lesions on the external surface of a glyptodont armor.
- Olivieri et al. (2025) describe new juvenile specimens of Paraeucinepeltus cf. raposeirasi from the Miocene strata of the Collón Curá Formation (Argentina), providing new information on the variation of the anatomy of glyptodonts during their ontogeny.
- Magoulick et al. (2025) determine that environmental conditions in Central America during the Plio-Pleistocene enabled dispersal of Glyptotherium from South America to North America, and possibly also its migration back to South America during the Rancholabrean.
- Le Verger & Sánchez-Villagra (2025) study ossifications of nasal cartilage of glyptodonts belonging to the group Neosclerocalyptini, focusing on the oldest Pleistocene species Neosclerocalyptus pseudornatus, and interpret the studied ossifications as originally having a structural function, with possible function in hydric and thermal regulation in later members of the group interpreted as an exaptation.
- Fossil material of Pucatherium parvum, representing the first finding of a mammal from the Eocene Río Nío Formation (Argentina), is described by Gaudioso et al. (2025).
- Barasoain et al. (2025) identify fossil material of euphractine and dasypodid armadillos from the late Pleistocene strata of the Río Bermejo Formation (Formosa Province, Argentina), providing evidence of presence of taxa previously thought to have retreated to northern areas during the Marine Isotope Stage 2.

=== Pilosans ===
==== Pilosan research ====
- Hachemi-Rachedi et al. (2025) identify differences in the snout morphology of anteaters belonging to the families Cyclopedidae and Myrmecophagidae, and identify the anteater skull from the Miocene strata from La Venta (Colombia) reported by Jiménez-Lara & González (2020) as belonging to a member of the family Myrmecophagidae.
- Boscaini et al. (2025) study the evolution of ground sloths and its drivers, and interpret rapid extinction of ground sloths as likely related to human-driven factors.
- Fariña et al. (2025) identify an indentation in a calcaneus of a 33,000-year-old specimen of Lestodon armatus from the Arroyo del Vizcaíno site (Uruguay), interpreted as likely produced by a wooden shaft with an attached conical tip, and thus as likely resulting from human agency.
- Evidence from the study of remains of strontium isotope composition of remains of Lestodon armatus from six localities in Uruguay, interpreted as indicative of limited movement and ruling out extensive seasonal migrations, is presented by Varela & Fariña (2025).
- New megatherioid ground sloth specimen, possibly representing a new taxon, is described from the Miocene strata of the La Venta site (Colombia) by Miño-Boilini et al. (2025).
- A study on the anatomy and affinities of members of the genus Eucholoeops is published by de Iuliis et al. (2025), who interpret E. latifrons as a valid species distinct from E. ingens.
- Bravo Cuevas, Villanueva Amadoz & Espinosa Ortiz (2025) describe fossil material of a member of the genus Megalonyx from the Blancan strata from the Los Hornitos locality in Sonora, representing the first record of the genus from the Pliocene of Mexico.
- Vázquez et al. (2025) describe a lower jaw of a member of the genus Nothrotheriops from the Arroyo Cobos site (Mexico), and interpret the tooth wear of the studied specimen as indicating that the individual was a mixed feeder with the diet that involved both browsing and grazing.
- McDonald & Ruddell (2025) report the first discovery of fossil material of a member of the genus Nothrotheriops from the central Mississippi River drainage in Arkansas (United States), providing a connection between records of Nothrotheriops from Florida and those from Mexico and southwestern United States.
- Potter & Prothero (2025) report possible evidence of presence of sexual dimorphism in the skulls of Nothrotheriops shastensis.
- Evidence interpreted as indicating that megathere ground sloths had lower body temperatures than reported in other large terrestrial mammals, as well as indicative of varied fur coverage depending on the environment, is presented by Deak et al. (2025).
- Isolated ribs of Eremotherium laurillardi affected by spondyloarthropathy and osteomyelitis are described from the Lagoa da Pedra Quaternary tank deposit (Brazil) by Andrade (2025).
- Straulino Mainou et al. (2025) study diagenetic features of a specimen of Megatherium from the Pleistocene strata from the Quebrada Maní 35/7 site (Chile), and study the impact of environmental changes since the death of this individual on the preservation of its remains.
- Evidence from the study of tooth wear of Nothrotheriops shastensis and Paramylodon harlani from the La Brea Tar Pits, indicating that P. harlani consumed harder foods than N. shastensis and that diets of ground sloths differed from those of co-occurring herbivores, is presented by Kurre & DeSantis (2025).

== Other eutherians ==
Name	Novelty	Status	Authors	Age	Type locality	Country	Notes	Images
Ravjaa	Gen. et sp. nov	Valid	Okoshi et al.	Late Cretaceous (Cenomanian-Santonian)	Bayanshiree Formation	Mongolia	A member of the family Zhelestidae. The type species is R. ishiii.	
Zoslestes	Gen. et sp. nov	In press	Novacek et al.	Late Cretaceous (Santonian or Campanian)	Zos Formation	Mongolia	A member of the family Zalambdalestidae. The type species is Z. gongori.	

=== Miscellaneous eutherian research ===
- A petrosal bone of a eutherian of uncertain affinities (possibly an asioryctitherian) is described from the Cenomanian Khodzhakul Formation (Uzbekistan) by Averianov & Sinitsa (2025).
- Chen et al. (2025) describe new fossil material of Zhangolestes jilinensis from the Upper Cretaceous Quantou Formation (Jilin, China), possibly belonging to the same individual as the holotype lower jaw, and interpret the additional mandibular fragment originally included in this species as belonging to a different individual, and possibly to a different eutherian taxon.
- A study on the bone histology and life history of Conoryctes comma, providing evidence of growth rates similar to those of extant placentals of comparable size, is published by Funston et al. (2025).

== Metatherians ==
Name	Novelty	Status	Authors	Age	Type locality	Country	Notes	Images
Chitinodectes	Gen. et sp. nov	Valid	Churchill, Archer & Hand	Probably early Miocene	Riversleigh World Heritage Area	Australia	A member of the family Malleodectidae. The type species is C. wessechresti.	
Dimartinia	Gen. et sp. nov		Suarez et al.	Miocene (Chasicoan)	Cerro Azul Formation	Argentina	A member of Sparassodonta. The type species is D. pristina.	
Dorcopsoides cowpatensis	Sp. nov	Valid	Kerr & Prideaux	Miocene	Waite Formation	Australia		
Eudolops martini	Sp. nov		Goin et al.	Eocene		Argentina	A member of the family Polydolopidae.	
Exosmachus	Gen. et sp. nov	Valid	Churchill, Archer & Hand	Probably late Oligocene and early Miocene	Riversleigh World Heritage Area	Australia	A member of the family Malleodectidae. The type species is E. robinbecki.	
Malleodectes arenai	Sp. nov	Valid	Churchill, Archer & Hand	Miocene	Riversleigh World Heritage Area	Australia		
Oryctodelphys	Gen. et sp. nov	Valid	Carneiro et al.	Eocene	Itaboraí Basin	Brazil	A member of the family Derorhynchidae. The type species is O. tropicalis.	
Protamalleus	Gen. et sp. nov	Valid	Churchill, Archer & Hand	Probably late Oligocene	Riversleigh World Heritage Area	Australia	A member of the family Malleodectidae. The type species is P. stevewroei.	
Swaindelphys solastella	Sp. nov		Miller & Beard	Paleocene	Black Peaks Formation	United States (Texas)		
Weirdodectes	Gen. et sp. nov	Valid	Churchill, Archer & Hand	Miocene	Riversleigh World Heritage Area	Australia	A probable member of the family Malleodectidae. The type species is W. napoleoni.	

=== Metatherian research ===
- Carneiro, Bampi & Lages (2025) study the morphology and occlusion of the molars of Xenocynus crypticus, and interpret their findings as supporting the taxonomic validity of the studied species.
- Carneiro et al. (2025) study adaptations to diverse trophic niches in early members of Pucadelphyda (the group including pucadelphyids and sparassodonts), interpret Xenocynus as a sparassodont with a unique trophic niche, and interpret sparassodonts as already occupying carnivorous trophic niches during the early Paleocene.
- A study on the braincase endocasts of ten species of sparassodonts is published by Gaillard et al. (2025), who report evidence of similarity of neuroanatomy of the studied species (with exception of Thylacosmilus atrox) to that of extant marsupials.
- A study on the variability of the infraorbital foramen in sparassodonts is published by Suarez et al. (2025), who find that the infraorbital foramen area in Thylacosmilus is comparable to those of active predators, and interpret this finding as challenging the idea that the infraorbital foramen area in Thylacosmilus is consistent with scavenging behavior.
- Rangel et al. (2025) describe a sparassodont canine from the Tremembé Formation (Brazil) providing evidence of presence of a large proborhyaenid predator in the studied area during the late Oligocene.
- Chornogubsky et al. (2025) study the body mass of members of the family Polydolopidae, providing evidence of increase of body size over time, but not evidence that Bergmann's rule applied to members of the group.
- Description of new fossil material of Lestodelphys juga from the Pleistocene (Lujanian) strata near the Arrecifes River (Buenos Aires, Argentina) and a study on the morphological variability of members of the genus Lestodelphys is published by Suarez et al. (2025).
- A study on tooth wear in extant and fossil kangaroos is published by Arman, Gully & Prideaux (2025), who interpret their findings as indicating that Pleistocene kangaroos had more generalist diets than indicated by the anatomy of their skull and teeth, and likely indicating that extinctions of Pleistocene kangaroos were not driven by climate and environmental changes.
- Evidence from the study of the strontium isotope composition of tooth enamel of members of the genus Protemnodon from Mt Etna caves (Queensland, Australia), indicative of limited foraging ranges of the studied specimens, is presented by Laurikainen Gaete et al. (2025).
- Evidence of habitat partitioning and limited foraging ranges of kangaroos from the Middle Pleistocene strata from Mt Etna caves is presented by Laurikainen Gaete et al. (2025).
- Kerr et al. (2025) provide new information on the morphology of limbs of Dorcopsoides fossilis, interpreted as indicative of the earliest adaptation of a macropodine kangaroo to open habitats reported to date.
- Paleogenomic and comparative genomic evidence linking ancestral gene losses with shift towards hypercarnivory and greater body size in thylacines, as well as indicative of olfactory receptor loss and relaxed selection in the studied marsupials, is presented by Salve & Vijay (2025).
- Buckley et al. (2025) study the affinities of Zygomaturus, Palorchestes, Thylacoleo, Protemnodon and Simosthenurus on the basis of peptide sequence data from bones from sites in Tasmania, providing evidence of a close phylogenetic relationship between Thylacoleo and the koala.

== Monotremes ==
=== Monotreme research ===
- Hand et al. (2025) report evidence of adaptations to semiaquatic lifestyle in the microstructure of the humerus of Kryoryctes cadburyi.

== Other mammals ==
Name	Novelty	Status	Authors	Age	Type locality	Country	Notes	Images
Cambelodon	Gen. et sp. nov		Carvalho et al.	Late Jurassic (Tithonian)	Freixial Formation	Portugal	A multituberculate belonging to the family Pinheirodontidae. The type species is C. torreensis.	
Magallanodon terrwerr	Sp. nov		Chimento et al.	Late Cretaceous (Maastrichtian)	Chorrillo Formation	Argentina		
Notopolytheles	Gen. et sp. nov	Valid	Gelfo, Goin & Vega	Late Cretaceous (Maastrichtian)	La Colonia Formation	Argentina	A multituberculate, possibly a member of the family Neoplagiaulacidae. The type species is N. joelis.	
Novaculadon	Gen. et sp. nov	In press	Weston et al.	Early Cretaceous (Berriasian)	Lulworth Formation	United Kingdom	A multituberculate belonging to the family Plagiaulacidae. The type species is N. mirabilis.	
Yeutherium	Gen. et sp. nov		Püschel et al.	Late Cretaceous	Dorotea Formation	Chile	A member of the family Reigitheriidae. The type species is Y. pressor.	

=== Other mammalian research ===
- Averianov et al. (2025) study the replacement pattern of molariform teeth in Acinacodus on the basis of data from a new specimen, and argue that replacement of molariform teeth was widespread in stem mammals.
- Skutschas et al. (2025) identify tooth marks on the maxilla of Kundurosaurus nagornyi, interpreted as probable evidence of extensive gnawing by multituberculates.
- Lopatin & Averianov (2025) describe partial humerus of a multituberculate from the Gurilin Tsav locality (Nemegt Formation; Mongolia), possibly belonging to a member of the genus Buginbaatar, sharing similarities with the humerus of Meniscoessus robustus from the Hell Creek Formation and potentially supporting the assignment of Buginbaatar to the family Cimolomyidae.
- A multituberculate tooth with similarities to teeth of the North American eucosmodontid Stygimys is described from the Maastrichtian Udurchukan Formation (Russia) by Averianov et al. (2025).
- Hoffmann & Krause (2025) revise the fossil material of Taeniolabis taoensis, and interpret it as a ground-dwelling, likely fossorial mammal.
- Burger (2025) reports evidence of association of Eocene multituberculates from North America with forests dominated by Metasequoia and Glyptostrobus, and interprets the decline of multituberculates as more likely linked to decline of such forests than to competition with rodents.
- Luo et al. (2025) provide new information on the anatomy of the internal cranial structures and the middle ear of Origolestes lii.
- New fossil material of Peligrotherium tropicalis, providing new information on dentition of members of this species, is described from the Paleocene Salamanca Formation (Argentina) by Rougier et al. (2025).

== General mammalian research ==
- Bertrand & Krubitzer (2025) review paleontological and neurobiological evidence of evolution of the mammalian brain structure.
- Review of studies on the early evolution of the mammalian skull anatomy and its impact on the mammalian feeding efficiency and hearing ability is published by Schultz (2025).
- Evidence from the study of extant mammals, indicating that olfactory capabilities of fossil mammals can be studied on the basis of data from olfactory bulb endocasts, is presented by Martinez et al. (2025).
- Evidence from the study of melanosome geometry and its relation to hair coloration in extant therian mammals and Vilevolodon diplomylos, indicative of limited range of melanosome geometry and likely limited color variation in Mesozoic mammals, is presented by Li et al. (2025).
- Wang et al. (2025) provide new information on the morphology of skull and teeth of Acristatherium, and reconstruct the evolution of the dental formula in early therians, metatherians and eutherians.
- Janis et al. (2025) study postcranial remains of latest Cretaceous and earliest Paleogene therian mammals from Montana, Wyoming, North Dakota (United States) and Alberta (Canada), and interpret the studied fossils as indicative of a shift of the preference of therians from arboreal to terrestrial habitats towards the end of the Cretaceous.
- Pinkert et al. (2025) study the distribution of extant burrowing and non-burrowing terrestrial mammals and the timing or origination of burrowing mammal lineages, find that the diversity of burrowing lineages peaked during the Cretaceous-Paleogene transition, and argue that burrowing behavior promoted survival of mammals during the Cretaceous–Paleogene extinction event.
- Evidence from the study of morphology, puncture performance and breakage resistance of saber teeth, interpreted as indicating that repeated evolution of saber teeth in mammalian carnivores is a result of selection for functionally optimal morphology, is presented by Pollock et al. (2025).
- Pollock & Anderson (2025) review the studies of functional biomechanics of pointed teeth and study the morphological diversity of teeth of thylacosmilids, nimravids and felids, reporting evidence of morphological diversity of saber teeth that was likely related to functional diversity.
- Salcido & Polly (2025) study the shape, biomechanical properties and evolution of the mandible in metatherian, mesonychian, "creodont" and carnivoramorph carnivores.
- Aureliano et al. (2025) compare the microstructure of appendicular bones in non-avian dinosaurs and large-bodied mammals, and interpret it as indicating that gigantism was achieved through divergent evolutionary pathways in the two groups.
- Ugarte, Nascimento & Pires (2025) study the distribution and completeness of the fossil record of Cenozoic mammals from South America, as well as its implications for the knowledge of the evolution of South American mammals.
- Blanco et al. (2025) report evidence of prolonged ecological stability of continental assemblages of proboscideans, odd-toed ungulates and even-toed ungulates during the Cenozoic, interrupted by two major reorganizations related to the formation of a land bridge between Eurasia and Africa 21 million years ago and to aridification and expansion of C_{4}-dominated grasslands around 10 million years ago.
- Sweedler, Rust & Beard (2025) revise the Paleocene mammalian assemblage from the Titanoides locality in the Bison Basin (Wyoming, United States), and reinterpret it as dating to the Ti4 rather than the Ti5 substage of the Tiffanian.
- Tabuce et al. (2025) report the discovery of a new mammalian fauna from Albas (France), providing evidence that metatherians, "creodonts", rodents and paromomyids dispersed into Europe before the Paleocene–Eocene Thermal Maximum, possibly during the pre-onset excursion preceding PETM.
- Lihoreau et al. (2025) describe fossil material of Ypresian mammals from three new localities in the south of France, providing new information on the biochronology of early Paleogene European mammals.
- Montheil et al. (2025) provide new age estimates for the Eocene sites Çamili Mezra, Ciçekdagi and Bultu-Zile, indicating an early Lutetian minimum age for the endemic mammal fauna of Balkanatolia.
- McCarroll et al. (2025) study the composition of the Uintan mammalian assemblage from the uppermost unit of the Adobe Town Member of the Washakie Formation (Wyoming, United States).
- Montheil et al. (2025) present a new geographical reconstruction of the Neotethyan and the Atlantic domains during the middle to late Eocene, and identify most likely routes of dispersal of terrestrial mammals from Asia to other continents.
- A study on the diversity dynamics of South American mammals during the Paleogene, providing evidence of a diversity decline from the middle Eocene followed by a taxonomic turnover in the Oligocene which were likely related to environmental changes, is published by Buffan et al. (2025).
- A study on the composition and age of the early Miocene mammal assemblage from the Maysville Local Fauna (Belgrade Formation; North Carolina, United States) is published by MacFadden et al. (2025).
- Fox et al. (2025) reconstruct early Miocene terrestrial environments at Rusinga Group localities on Rusinga Island (Kenya) on the basis of the study of carbon and oxygen isotope composition of tooth enamel of mammals from the Hiwegi and Kulu Formations, and report evidence of presence of a range of habitats and their differential exploitation by various mammals.
- A study on the longevity of mammal species from the southern cone of South America from late Miocene to early Pleistocene is published by Prevosti et al. (2025).
- Valenzuela-Toro et al. (2025) describe a new, nearly complete skeleton of Thalassocnus natans from the Miocene strata of the Bahía Inglesa Formation (Chile) and review the fossil record of marine mammal herbivores from western coast of South America, reporting that the studied mammals did not reach body sizes comparable to their counterparts from North Pacific.
- Wilson et al. (2025) update the faunal list for the Miocene Castilletes Formation (Colombia) on the basis of new fossil material, reporting the first records of cf. Pericotoxodon sp., Miocochilius cf. anomopodus and "Scleromys" sp. from the studied formation.
- Green et al. (2025) recover small enamel proteomes from fossil remains of proboscideans (including Prodeinotherium hobleyi, Zygolophodon sp., an indeterminate gomphothere and Palaeoloxodon recki), Arsinoitherium, rhinocerotids, anthracotheriids and hippopotamids from sites in the Turkana Basin ranging from the Oligocene to Pleistocene.
- Werner et al. (2025) report evidence indicating that East African uplift and atmospheric CO_{2} changes promoted grassland expansion across East and Central Africa during the Miocene and facilitated shifts in mammalian communities at the time.
- Wang et al. (2025) identify two peaks of contribution of Central Asian mammalian faunas to the formation of mammalian faunas of northern continents during the Miocene, linking the more recent peak to the formation of formation of the modern large-mammalian faunas, and interpret the expansion of Central Asian mammals as related to the uplift of the Tibetan Plateau and expansion of open and arid environments.
- Evidence of emergence of open savanna landscapes in northern China beginning in the late early Miocene, and of adaptation of large mammalian herbivores to the new savanna habitats, is presented by Li et al. (2025).
- Iqbal et al. (2025) describe new fossil material of Miocene mammals from the Gazlope fossil locality in the Sulaiman Range (Pakistan), including the first records of Sivatherium giganteum, Dorcatherium minus and Percrocuta carnifex in the studied region.
- Konidaris et al. (2025) study the composition of the mammalian assemblage from the new Turolian vertebrate locality Kayaca (Beyağaç Basin, Turkey), reporting evidence of similarities with the faunas from Samos.
- Evidence from the study of pollen data from the eastern part of the North China Plain, indicative of climate changes in northern China since the late Pliocene that coincided with shift in composition of the mammalian fauna, is presented by Hua et al. (2025).
- Mulè et al. (2025) revise fossil material of large mammals from Le Riège and Saint-Palais localities (France), and interpret the studied fossils as evidence of presence of two distinct mammalian assemblages (a Pliocene one and a Pleistocene one).
- A study on mammalian communities from western North America across the Pliocene-Pleistocene transition is published by Shupinski et al. (2025), who report that the Great American Interchange and environmental changes related to glaciation did not result in significant changes of the structure of the studied communities, in spite of changes of their composition.
- Motta & Quental (2025) study the composition of mammalian assemblages from North and South America after the Great American Interchange, report that the assemblages closer to the point of entrance in both continents had higher proportion of immigrant taxa, and find that this relationship became weaker in South America during the later stages of the Pleistocene but remained strong in North America.
- Evidence from the study of Plio-Pleistocene mammal communities from Esquina Blanca (Uquía Formation, Argentina), Laetoli (Tanzania) and Thum Wimam Nakin (Thailand), indicating that niche exploitation profiles of tropical mammal communities can be used to determine past climate conditions of their environment, is presented by Kovarovic & Lintulaakso (2025).
- Bromage et al. (2025) study the biology and environment of mammals from Plio-Pleistocene localities in Olduvai Gorge (Tanzania), Chiwondo Beds (Malawi) and Makapansgat (South Africa) on the basis of metabolomes recovered from their remains.
- Aguilar et al. (2025) revise the fossil record of Quaternary (mostly Rancholabrean) large herbivorous mammals from Jalisco (Mexico).
- Review of the history of reporting of large mammals from the cave sites from the Cradle of Humankind (South Africa), their biochronology and their implications for paleoenvironmental reconstructions is published by Malherbe et al. (2025).
- Linchamps et al. (2025) reconstruct past climate in the Cradle of Humankind area as indicated by mammalian fossil assemblages, finding no evidence of a progressive shift toward aridification during the past 3.5 million years.
- Geraads et al. (2025) study the composition of the Pliocene-Pleistocene vertebrate fauna from Lomekwi (Kenya), including possible new species of Lutra and Panthera.
- Linchamps et al. (2025) study the composition of the assemblage of small mammals from the Pleistocene strata of the Lower Bank of Member 1 at the Swartkrans cave site (South Africa), and interpret the studied fossils as indicative of environment dominated by grassland and bushland habitats, with components of forest and woodland habitats.
- Domínguez-Rodrigo et al. (2025) confirm the identification of tooth marks on remains of two individuals of Homo habilis from Olduvai Gorge (Tanzania) as produced by leopards, indicating that early members of the genus Homo were still preyed upon by carnivorans.
- Evidence from the study of strontium isotope ratios in tooth enamel of Pleistocene herbivores from the Tighennif site (Algeria), indicating that the variance in the strontium isotope patterns is related to niche partitioning of the studied herbivores and possibly also to the differences of their digestive system physiologies, is presented by Armaroli et al. (2025).
- Curran et al. (2025) study the taphonomy of the Gelasian assemblages (dominated by large mammals and including cut-marked bones described by Curran et al., 2025) from the sites in the Olteţ River Valley (Romania), interpreted as consistent with accumulation of fossils from the studied sites in flooding events in an alluvial plain.
- Duval et al. (2025) determine that the mammalian assemblage from Incarcal-I (Spain) dates to the latest part of the Early Pleistocene.
- Bai et al. (2025) study the composition of Pleistocene mammalian faunas from parts of China affected by summer monsoons, and interpret the studied faunas as providing information on Pleistocene forest and steppe dynamics.
- Hu et al. (2025) report the discovery of new fossil material of Pleistocene mammals from the Dayakou pit (Chongqing, China), including first records of Ailuropoda melanoleuca wulingshanensis, Tapirus sinensis and Leptobos sp. in the Yanjinggou area, and providing new information on changes of mammal faunas from south China during the Early-Middle Pleistocene transition.
- Berghuis et al. (2025) describe a vertebrate assemblage (including mammals) from a subsea site in the Madura Strait off the coast of Surabaya, living in the now-submerged part of Sundaland during the Middle Pleistocene, and report differences in the composition of this assemblage compared to the vertebrate assemblage from Ngandong (Java, Indonesia), including evidence of survival of Duboisia santeng, Epileptobos groeneveldtii and Axis lydekkeri in Java until the end of the Middle Pleistocene; Berghuis et al. (2025) describe two cranial fragments of Homo erectus from this site, while Berghuis et al. (2025) report evidence from the study of ruminant remains from the site indicative of selective hunting of prime adult prey by hominins, as well as of marrow processing by hominins.
- Matthews et al. (2025) describe a new assemblage of fossils of 17 mammalian taxa (including 6 kangaroos) from the Kiana Cliff site (Eyre Peninsula, Australia), determined to date to the Last Interglacial.
- Evidence from enamel-bound zinc and nitrogen analyses of teeth of Pleistocene mammals from the Coc Muoi and Duoi U'Oi sites (Vietnam), interpreted as indicative of greater dietary flexibility of mammals with extant counterparts in the studied area compared to extinct ones, is presented by Bourgon et al. (2025).
- Neto de Carvalho et al. (2025) describe tracks of carnivorans, artiodactyls, horses and straight-tusked elephants dating to the Last Interglacial from the southeastern coast of Spain, interpreted as suggestive of use of beaches and dune systems as travel corridors by straight-tusked elephants.
- A study on the composition the Pleistocene mammalian assemblage from the Upper Yana basin (Sakha Republic, Russia) is published by Maschenko, Lebedev & Voskresenskaya (2025).
- Jacobs et al. (2025) reconstruct the chronology of occupation of Denisova Cave by hominins and other mammals on the basis of the study of mitochondrial DNA, skeletal remains and artefacts.
- Petrova, Burova & Bessudnov (2025) link the formation of assemblages of mammalian bones from the Upper Paleolithic site Kostenki 17 (Voronezh Oblast, Russia) to human hunting and gathering activities, and report evidence of specialized hunting of arctic foxes by people occupying the site.
- Mecozzi, Zorzin & Tomelleri (2025) describe the mammalian assemblage from Selva Vecchia (Italy) living between 0.85 and 0.78 million years ago, and interpret its composition as indicative of a faunal turnover just before the beginning of the Middle Pleistocene.
- Oertle et al. (2025) use paleoproteomic techniques to identify bone fragments from the Pleistocene strata from Grotta di Castelcivita (southern Italy), and report the identification of canid, Ursus sp. and rhinoceros material from deeper Mousterian deposits from the site than earlier known records, extending known record of presence of these mammals in the region.
- Domínguez-García et al. (2025) study the composition of the small mammal assemblage from the Late Pleistocene stratigraphic layers from the Los Casares cave (Spain), interpreted as indicative of transitional temperate-Mediterranean climate in the studied area at the time of its occupation by some of the last known Neanderthals from the inland Iberian Peninsula.
- Gelabert et al. (2025) study sedimentary ancient DNA from the El Mirón Cave (Spain), reporting evidence of presence of 28 taxa (humans, 21 herbivores and 6 carnivores), evidence of longer survival of leopards and hyenas in the Iberian Peninsula than indicated by fossil record, and evidence of the presence of a stable human population in the region of the cave during and after the Last Glacial Maximum.
- Syverson & Prothero (2025) study changes of the size or robustness of mammals from the La Brea Tar Pits, and find evidence of previously undetected changes in the studied taxa, but report no evidence of a clear relationship between those changes and changes in temperature.
- Evidence from the study of large mammal remains from a hyena den from the Besaansklip site (South Africa), indicative of increased moisture increased and possible expansion of grassy vegetation in the Cape Floristic Region during the Late Glacial Period, is presented by Sokolowski et al. (2025).
- Choe et al. (2025) study the composition of assemblages of small mammals from the Chongphadae Cave Site (North Korea), reporting evidence of alterations between communities adapted to different climates during the Late Pleistocene.
- Bellinzoni et al. (2025) identify a new mammalian assemblage from the Salto de Piedra paleontological locality, and report evidence of temporal overlap of index taxa used to define Quaternary biozones in the Argentine Pampas.
- Fernández-Monescillo et al. (2025) study trace found on remains of Mesotherium cristatum and an indeterminate camelid from the Quaternary strata from the Corralito fossil site (Argentina), and name two new ichnotaxa: Corralitoichnus conicetensis, interpreted as traces of rodent incisors possibly produced by a tuco-tuco, and Katagmichnus myelus, interpreted as bite traces produced by a medium–large carnivoran that broke bones to access the bone narrow.
- Ribeiro et al. (2025) interpret the mammalian fossil accumulation from Lagoa do Rumo (Bahia, Brazil) as most likely resulting from multiple attritional events related to prolonged droughts and subsequent redepositions of mammalian remains during the rainy seasons.
- McGrath et al. (2025) study worked bone objects from late Paleolithic sites from the Bay of Biscay area, reporting evidence indicating that Magdalenian peoples were utilizing the remains of at least five species of large whales, and evidence of previously undocumented diversity of whales at this time period in the studied area.
- Faria et al. (2025) determine the age of teeth of extinct members of mammalian megafauna from Itapipoca and the Rio Miranda valley in the Brazilian Intertropical Region, and report evidence of survival of the studied mammals until the middle and late Holocene, including survival of Palaeolama major and Xenorhinotherium bahiense until approximately 3500 years Before Present.
- A systematic review of the scientific literature on the late Quaternary megafauna extinction since the 1950s is published by Stewart et al. (2025).
- Lemoine et al. (2025) study the relationships between traits of late Pleistocene and Holocene mammals and their vulnerability to extinction, and find evidence of greater resistance to extinction of Paleotropical species and their relatives on other continents, possibly resulting from extinctions before the late Pleistocene, driven by early hominins, filtering out Paleotropical species with vulnerable traits.
- Evidence from the study of Pleistocene and Holocene mammal assemblages, indicative of disruption of structures of Holocene communities by introduction of domesticated animals and other human impacts, is presented by Brook et al. (2025).
- Valenzuela-Toro, Viglino & Loch (2025) review publications on fossil aquatic mammals from Latin America and their citation trends from 1990 to 2022, and find that Latin American and women researchers were underrepresented in the analyzed studies compared to Global North-based researchers and men, and that studies with a higher proportion Latin American authors and those published in languages other than English had lower citation rates.
- Evidence of impact of preservation and collector biases favouring the sampling of large taxa on known distributions of body sizes of Cenozoic mammals from North America is presented by Lindholm & Close (2025).
- Ceylan Wood (2025) compares the distribution of areas of potential sediment accumulation in mountainous areas in western United States with occurrences of extant mammals, and interprets her findings as indicating that mammalian taxa living at low elevations are unlikely to be overrepresented in sedimentary basins preserving well-sampled mammalian fossil assemblages.
- Ercoli et al. (2025) develop methods for reconstruction of mass and relative size of masticatory muscles in extinct herbivorous mammals, and apply them to Archaeotherium, Diprotodon, Megaladapis, Telicomys, Paedotherium and Argyrolagus.
