= Harbin cranium =

Archaic human from China, 146,000 BP

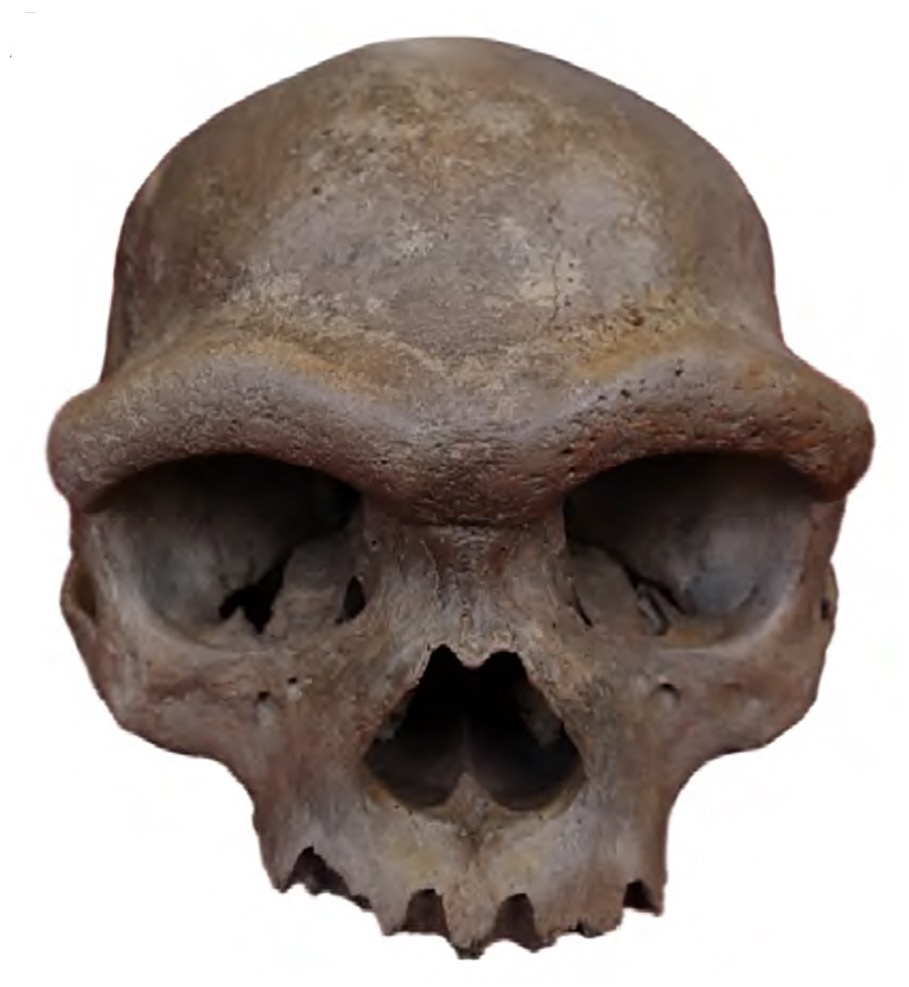
- Harbin cranium
- Common name: Harbin cranium
- Species: Homo longi
- Age: late Middle Pleistocene, minimum age of 146,000 years ago, probably younger than 309,000 years ago
- Place discovered: Likely within the vicinity of Harbin, Heilongjiang Province, China

The Harbin cranium is a nearly complete skull of an archaic human thought to originate from sediments of the Songhua River near Harbin on the Northeast China Plain. It dates to the late Middle Pleistocene, probably no older than 309,000 and no younger than 146,000 years ago. It was described in 2021, and that year it was controversially assigned as the holotype of the new human species Homo longi ("dragon man") named after the Chinese province of Heilongjiang (which means "black dragon river", the Chinese name for the Amur, of which the Songhua is a tributary) where the fossil is thought to have been found. The Harbin cranium was initially hypothesized to belong to the same species as the Denisovans, and subsequent proteomics and mitochondrial DNA analyses confirmed its Denisovan affinities.

The Harbin cranium is broadly anatomically similar to other Middle Pleistocene Chinese specimens. Like other archaic humans, the skull is low and long, with massively developed brow ridges, wide eye sockets, and a large mouth. The skull is the longest ever found from any human species. Like modern humans and the much earlier Homo antecessor, the face is rather flat, but with a larger nose. The brain volume was 1,420 cc, within the range of modern humans and Neanderthals.

== Taxonomy ==
=== Discovery ===
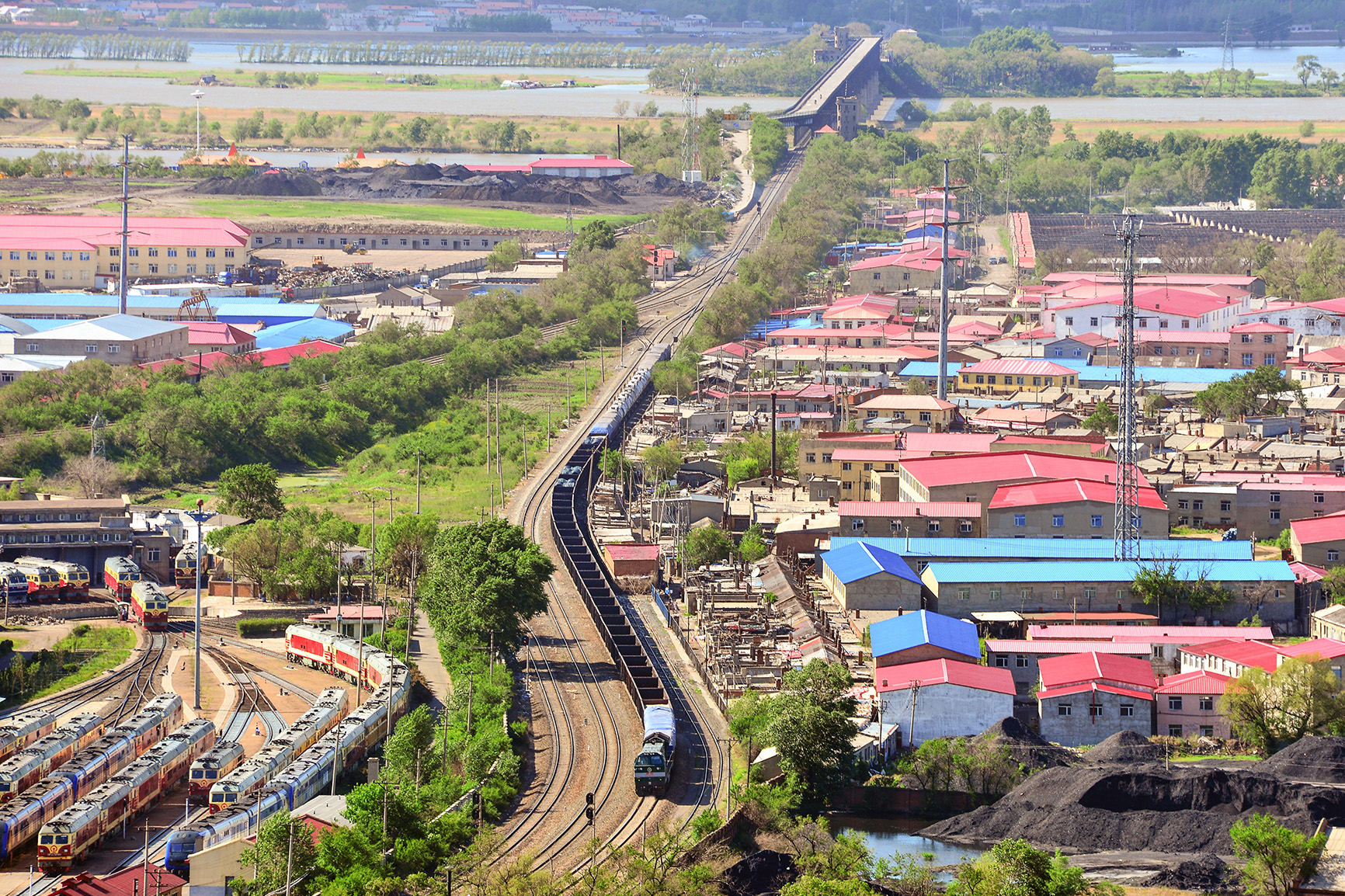
The skull was reputedly discovered in 1933 along Dongjiang Bridge (above), then under construction by the Manchukuo National Railway.

According to the account of the man who was in possession of the skull before it was given to scientists, in 1933, a local laborer found a nearly complete skull at the riverbank of Songhua River, when he was building the Dongjiang Bridge in Harbin (at the time part of Manchukuo) for the Japanese-aligned Manchukuo National Railway. Recognizing its importance, likely as a result of public interest in anthropology that had recently been generated by the Peking Man in 1929, just four years before, he hid it from the Manchukuo authorities in an abandoned well.

In 1945, upon the Soviet invasion of Manchuria that ended the Japanese occupation of the region, he concealed his former employment from the Nationalist and later the Communist authorities. Consequently, he could not report the skull, lest he divulge his ties to the Japanese imperialists in explaining its origin.

In 2018, before his death, the third generation of his family learned of the skull, and reclaimed it. Later that year, Chinese paleoanthropologist Ji Qiang persuaded the grandson to donate it to the Hebei GEO University for study, where it has since been stored. Its catalogue number is HBSM2018-000018(A).

Locations of the Harbin cranium and other confirmed Denisovan remains

However, the veracity of this story has been questioned. In a 2025 article, it was stated that Ji Qiang suspected the story was invented, and that the skull was actually discovered by the grandson himself rather than his grandfather, in which case the man failed to correctly report the find to authorities, though the skull’s origin within the Harbin area has not been contested.

=== Age ===
Owing to the skull's history, its exact provenance, and thus its stratigraphic context and age, has been difficult to determine.

In 2021, Chinese geologist Shao Qingfeng and colleagues performed non-destructive x-ray fluorescence, rare-earth element, and strontium isotope analyses on the skull and various other mammalian fossils unearthed around Dongjiang Bridge, and determined that all the fossils from the vicinity were likely deposited at around the same time, lived in the same region, and probably originate from the Upper Huangshan Formation, dating to 309 to 138 thousand years ago.

Direct uranium–thorium dating of various points on the skull yielded a wide range of dates, from 296 to 62 thousand years ago, likely a result of uranium leaching. They statistically determined the most likely minimum age is 146,000 years old, but a more exact value is difficult to determine, given that the exact provenance is unidentifiable. Nonetheless, the skull is well-constrained to the late Middle Pleistocene, roughly contemporaneous with other Chinese specimens from Xiahe, Jinniushan, Dali, and Hualong Cave.

=== Classification ===
A proposed recent human family tree

Cladogram based on palaeoproteomics:

- - - Australopithecina
      Paranthropus†
    - Homo
      - Homo antecessor†
      - - - Homo neanderthalensis†
          - Denisovan: Homo longi (Harbin)†
        - Homo sapiens

Cladogram of Homo longi (Denisovans) based on Feng et al., 2025:

★ indicates genetically confirmed Denisovans

- - Denisovans 1197.44
    - Maba
    - 1142.08
      - 443.13
        - Penghu 1★
        - Denisova cave★
        - Xujiayao
      - 1100.23
        - Jinniushan
        - 1060.91
          - Xiahe★
          - Hualongdong
          - Harbin★
          - - Yunxian
            - Dali

- - H. heidelbergensis
    - Neanderthals
    - - - Homo antecessor
        - - Jinniushan
          - - Hualong
            - - Dali
              - - Xiahe
                - Harbin
      - Modern humans

According to Ni et al. 2021 (note, Xiahe and Denisovans are most closely related to Neanderthals according to nDNA and ancient protein analyses.)

==== Earlier studies and naming controversy ====
In two simultaneously published papers, Ji and colleagues declared the Harbin cranium represents a new species they dubbed Homo longi, nicknamed “Dragon Man” (龙人 long·ren), with the species name longi deriving from the Chinese word for dragon, in reference to Heilongjiang Province (whose name literally means "black dragon river", taking its name from the Mandarin name for the Amur, which is also known as "Heilongjiang") where the fossil was reputedly discovered. However, their naming was considered controversial, with the paleoanthropologist María Martinón-Torres criticizing the authors' species description based on a "fossil with no context".

The Harbin cranium is quite similar to the Dali skull, and when the Dali skull was discovered in 1978, it was given a new nomen H. sapiens daliensis by its discoverer Wu Xinzhi who soon thereafter abandoned the name. Consequently, should the Middle Pleistocene Asian humans represent a single unique species, the nomen H. daliensis might take priority. Though they recommended resurrecting H. daliensis, they argued H. longi is sufficiently distinct, and allocated only the Dali and Hualong remains (often allocated to H. heidelbergensis by convention) to H. daliensis; thus, they claim at least two human species inhabited late Middle Pleistocene China. In 2021, one of the authors, Chris Stringer, stated that he would have preferred assigning the Harbin cranium to H. daliensis. However, according to a more recent assessment (including among its authors Xijun Ni, one of the describers of the species H. longi), since Wu wrote only that "it is suggested that Dali cranium probably represents a new subspecies" (p. 538, italics added for emphasis) the name daliensis was never validly published according to International Commission on Zoological Nomenclature (ICZN) rules, being proposed conditionally and published after 1960 (and not formally proposed by subsequent workers in the intervening period), and is therefore unavailable and thus could not compete with longi for priority. In 2025, Chris Stringer commented that the specific name given to the Harbin cranium, H. longi, would be the appropriate specific name for the Denisovans.

==== Denisovan affinities ====
Based on the conspicuously massive size of the molars, Ji et al. 2021 suggested the Harbin cranium is most closely related to and possibly the same species as the Xiahe mandible from Tibet, which has been grouped with the enigmatic Denisovans, an archaic human lineage apparently dispersed across East Asia during the Middle and Late Pleistocene currently identifiable from only a genetic signature. The Xiahe mandible is also anatomically similar to specimens from Xujiayao and Penghu. The Penghu mandible has also been identified through proteomics as a Denisovan. Ji, Ni and colleagues further contend that Middle Pleistocene Asian specimens are more closely related to modern humans (H. sapiens) than the European Neanderthals, though nuclear DNA and ancient protein analyses place the Xiahe mandible and Denisovans more closely to Neanderthals than to modern humans.

In June 2025, Qiaomei Fu and colleagues announced that the mitochondrial DNA and endogenous proteins of the Harbin cranium clusters with those of early Denisovans from southern Siberia. Dental calculus (calcified dental plaque) on the sole remaining tooth in the skull was the source of mitochondrial DNA and proteins analyzed, which is the first time that the host DNA has been recovered from this structure among Paleolithic human fossils. Xijun Ni of the Institute of Vertebrate Paleontology and Paleoanthropology, claimed that their results may have been compromised by his genetic contamination. Fu acknowledges in the paper "a substantial proportion" of the DNA she found was clearly the result of contamination. Using the established protocols to select only the DNA that is indeed ancient, the team found that the tiny amount of DNA remaining confidently identifies the skull as Denisovan. It contains 27 gene variants only found in the seven known Denisovan individuals, so none of these can arise from modern human contamination. The isolated proteins similarly support classification as Denisovan.

== Anatomy ==
The Harbin cranium is characterized by a low and long skull, receding forehead, extremely wide upper face, a large nasal opening equating to an enlarged nose (possibly an adaptation to the cold air), large and square eye sockets, inflated and thick brow ridges (supraorbital torus), flat cheekbones (zygomatic bone), a wide palate and large tooth sockets (equating to a large mouth), and a broad base of the skull. The Harbin cranium measures 221.3 mm × 164.1 mm (8.7 in × 6.5 in) in maximum length x breadth, with a naso-occipital length of 212.9 mm (8.4 in), making it the longest archaic human skull to date. For comparison, the dimensions of a modern human skull average 176 mm × 145 mm (6.9 in × 5.7 in) for men and 171 mm × 140 mm (6.7 in × 5.5 in) for women. The Harbin cranium also has the longest brow ridge at 145.7 mm (5.74 in).

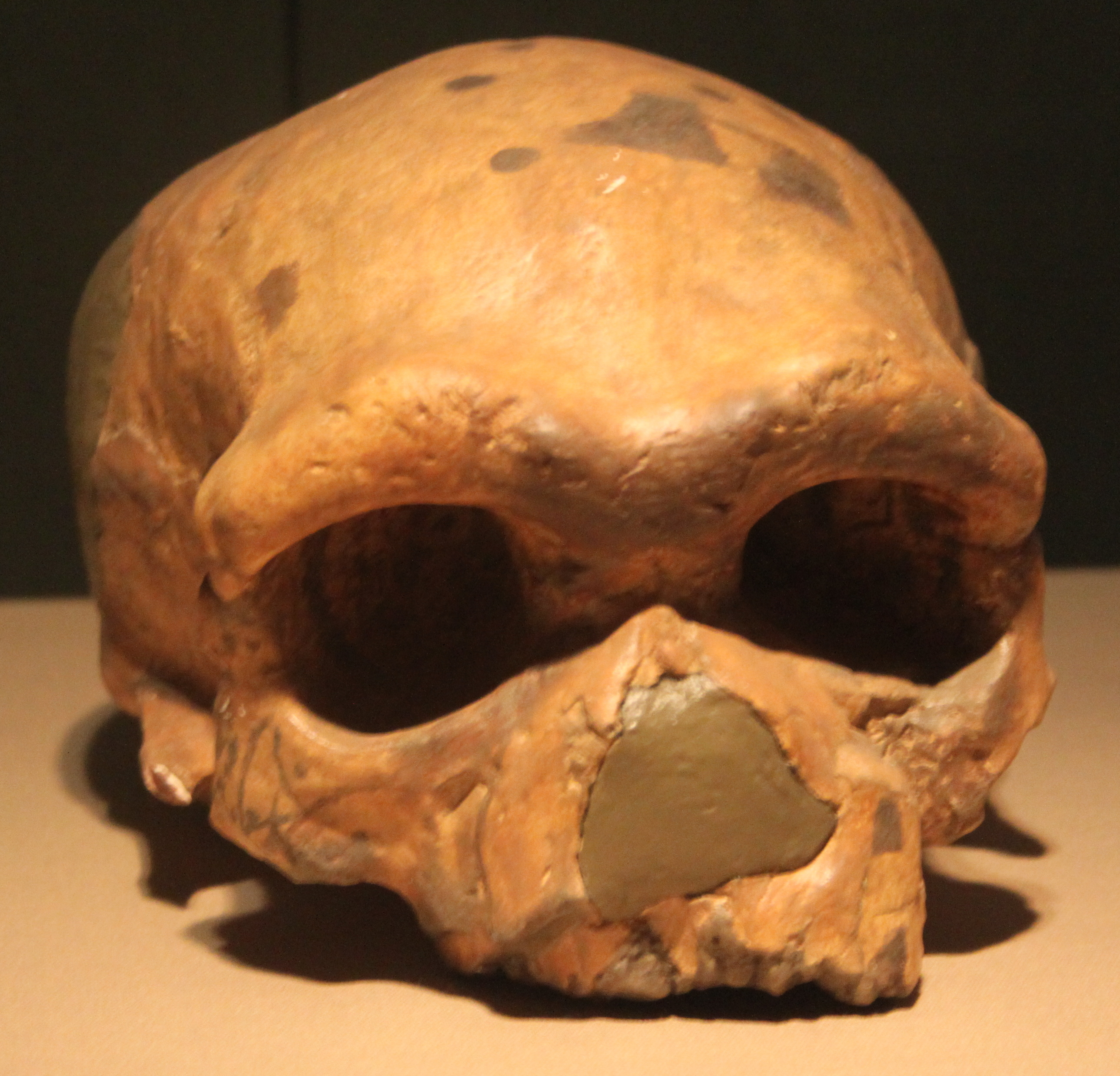
The Harbin cranium is similar to the contemporaneous Dali Man skull (reconstruction above).

The Harbin cranium had a massive brain at roughly 1,420 cc, above the range of all known human species except modern humans and Neanderthals. Nonetheless, post-orbital constriction (a constriction of the braincase just behind the eyes, absent in modern humans, and equating to the location of the frontal lobes) is more developed in the Harbin cranium than in Neanderthals, although not so much as in more-ancient human species. Overall, the braincase retains an array of archaic features, though the occipital bone at the back of the skull has a weakly defined sagittal keel that lacks a protuberance at the midpoint, unlike most other archaic humans. Unlike the Dali and Hualong Cave skulls, the keel does not run across the midline. Unlike modern humans or Neanderthals, the parietal bones on the top of the head do not significantly expand or protrude.

Despite the face being so wide, it was rather flat (reduced mid-facial prognathism), and resembles the anatomy found in modern humans, the far more ancient H. antecessor, and other Middle Pleistocene Chinese specimens. Nonetheless, the tooth sockets for the incisors were angled outward (alveolar prognathism). The Harbin cranium's mosaic morphology of archaic and derived traits converges with some of the earliest specimens assigned to H. sapiens from Africa, notably Rabat and Eliye Springs. Because the original describers judged the Harbin cranium to be closely allied with the Xiahe mandible, they believed it lacked a chin, like other archaic humans, but the specimen's lower jaw was not recovered. The only preserved tooth, the upper left second molar, is enormous, with a length x breadth (mesiodistal x labiolingual) of 13.6 mm × 16.6 mm (0.54 in × 0.65 in), comparable to the Denisovan molar recovered from Denisova Cave. The Harbin molar is oval-shaped, badly worn, and nearly flat. In contrast, the average dimensions of a sample of 40 modern human male molars were 10.2 mm × 11.8 mm (0.40 in × 0.46 in).

Ni and colleagues believed the Harbin cranium represents a male, judging by the robustness and size of the skull, who was less than 50 years old, looking at the suture closures and the degree of tooth wearing. They speculated this individual had perhaps medium-dark to medium-light skin, dark hair, and dark eye color based on reconstructed genetic sequences from Neanderthals, Denisovans, and early modern humans.

=== Pathology ===
The left parietal features shallow indents around the bregma, possibly from a healed injury. The second left upper molar does not appear to have been in contact with the third molar, which means either that the third molar was small (creating a gap), or it was absent in this individual.

== Paleoenvironment ==
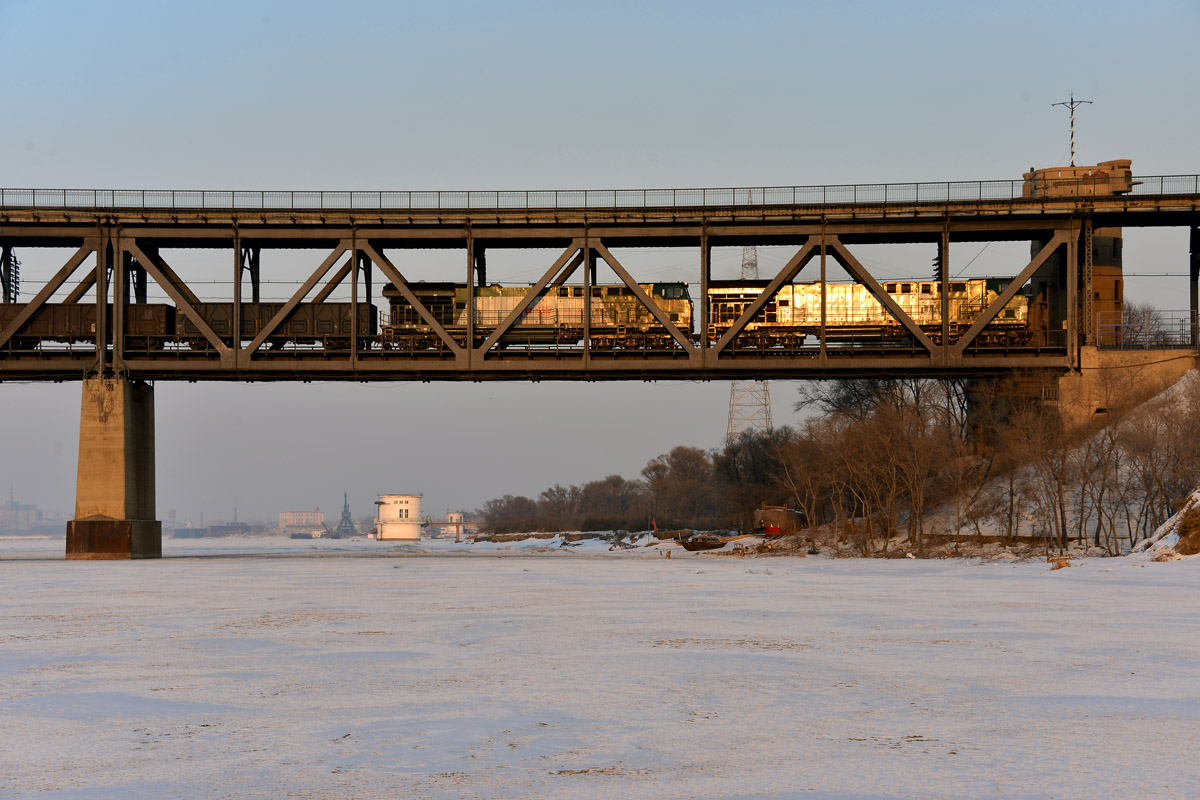
The locality of Dongjiang Bridge.

Middle-Late Pleistocene sediments around Harbin from which the skull is thought to originate also contain the remains of the giant deer Sinomegaceros ordosianus, wild horse, elk/wapiti, the buffalo Bubalus wansjocki, brown bear,^{(see supplemental material)} Eurasian beavers and the giant beaver Trogontherium, the antelope Procapra, marmots, tigers, cave lions, woolly mammoth and woolly rhinoceros.

== See also ==
- Denisovan
- Maba Man
- Red Deer Cave people
- Homo juluensis
