= Chen Fahu =

Chinese geographer and climatologist (born 1962)

- Born: December 1962 (age 63); Danfeng County, Shaanxi, China
- Education: Lanzhou University
- Scientific career
- Fields: Geography; Climatology
- Workplaces: Chinese Academy of Sciences
- Doctoral advisor: Li Jijun; Shi Yafeng

Chinese name
- Traditional Chinese: 陳發虎
- Simplified Chinese: 陈发虎
Transcriptions
Standard Mandarin
- Hanyu Pinyin: Chén Fāhǔ

Chen Fahu (Chinese: 陈发虎; pinyin: Chén Fāhǔ; born December 1962) is a Chinese geographer, geologist and climatologist who has served as Director of the Institute of Tibet Plateau Research of the Chinese Academy of Sciences since 2018. He formerly served as professor and Vice President of Lanzhou University, and Dean of the university's College of Earth and Environment Sciences. He is an academician of the Chinese Academy of Sciences and The World Academy of Sciences.

== Education and career ==
Chen was born in December 1962 in Danfeng County, Shaanxi, China. He earned his B.S. in physical geography in 1984, his M.S. in physical geography in 1987, and his Ph.D. in Quaternary sciences in 1990, all from Lanzhou University. His doctoral advisor was academician Li Jijun. He also studied under academician Shi Yafeng.

After earning his Ph.D., Chen became a lecturer in the Department of Geography of Lanzhou University and later promoted to associate professor and professor. From 1995 to 1997, he conducted postdoctoral research at the University of Liverpool in England. He served as Dean of Lanzhou University's College of Earth and Environment Sciences from 1999 to 2005, and was appointed Vice President of the university in 2007, responsible for both research and the university journal. In 2018, he was transferred to Beijing to serve as Professor and Director of the Institute of Tibet Plateau Research of the Chinese Academy of Sciences.

== Research ==
Chen's research interests include Quaternary environment, climate change, environmental archaeology, and palaeolimnology. He proposed and demonstrated the "Westerly Climate Regime" in Asia during the Holocene epoch and confirmed rapid changes in Asian monsoons.

In 2010, Chen and his colleague Zhang Dongju, his former Ph.D. student, began studying the Xiahe mandible, an unusual hominin fossil discovered in 1980 in the Baishiya Karst Cave by a Tibetan monk. They surveyed a number of caves in the Xiahe area. As so much time had passed since its initial discovery, it took them six years to ascertain that the fossil came from the Baishiya Karst Cave. In 2018, Zhang led a systematic excavation of the cave and discovered numerous palaeolithic tools and animal bones bearing cut marks. In collaboration with Jean-Jacques Hublin at the Max Planck Institute for Evolutionary Anthropology, they used palaeoproteomic analysis to confirm that the mandible belonged to the first known Denisovan outside Siberia, and the earliest human known to have lived on the high-altitude Tibetan Plateau, dating to 160,000 years ago.

== Honours and recognition ==
Chen received the China Youth Science and Technology Award in 1996, the National Outstanding Scientist Award in 2005, and the State Natural Science Award (Second Class) in 2007.

Chen was elected an academician of the Chinese Academy of Sciences in 2015, and of The World Academy of Sciences (TWAS) in 2016.
