= Baishiya Karst Cave =

Buddhist sanctuary and paleoanthrological site on the Tibetan Plateau in Gansu, China

- 白石崖溶洞 (Chinese)
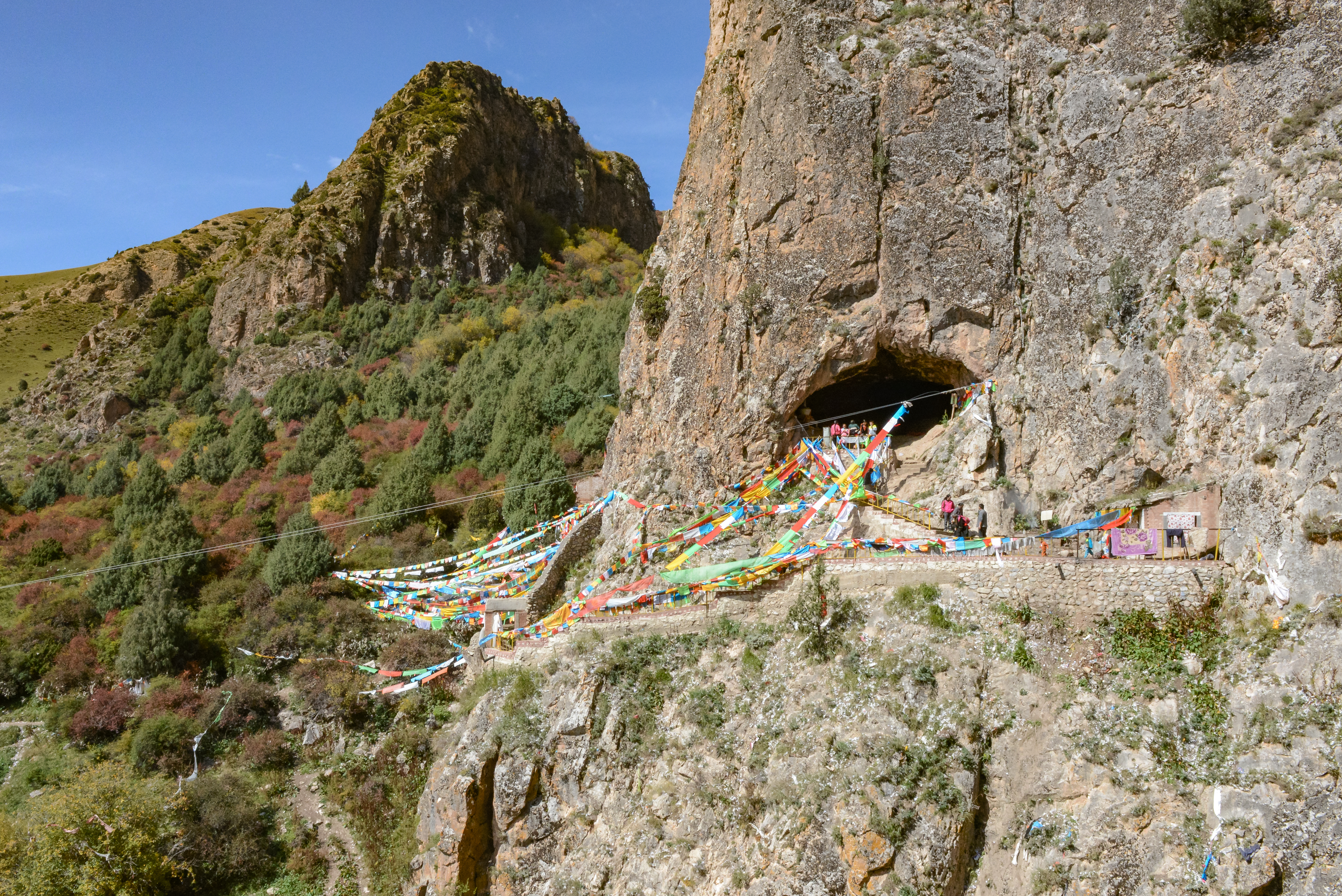

- Location in Gansu Baishiya Karst Cave (Gansu) Baishiya Karst Cave (China)
- 35°26′53″N 102°34′17″E
- Type: karst cave
- Location: Xiahe County, Gansu, China
- Region: Ganjia Basin, Tibetan Plateau

Site notes
- Elevation: 3,280 m (10,760 ft)
- Height: 10 m (33 ft)
- Length: > 1 km (3,281 ft)
- Width: 20 m (66 ft)
- Excavation dates: 2018
- Archaeologists: Zhang Dongju, Chen Fahu

Baishiya Karst Cave (Chinese: 白石崖溶洞) is a high-altitude paleoanthropological site and a Tibetan Buddhist sanctuary located on the northeastern edge of the Tibetan Plateau in Xiahe County, Gansu, China. This karst cave is the site of the discovery of the earliest hominin fossil found on the Tibetan Plateau, the Xiahe mandible. The mandible, by way of palaeoproteomic analysis, is the first confirmed discovery of a Denisovan fossil outside of Denisova Cave. This fossil discovery shows that archaic hominins were present in a high-altitude, low-oxygen environment by around 160,000 years ago.

== Geography ==
Baishiya Karst Cave is located in Ganjia (甘加镇), Xiahe County, Gannan Tibetan Autonomous Prefecture, Gansu, China, on the northeastern edge of the Tibetan Plateau. It lies on the southern side of Dalijiashan Mountain, at the foot of a white cliff. The cave is situated in the Ganjia Basin, at the mouth of the Jiangla River, a tributary of the Yangqu River. The cave is over 1 km (3,281 ft) in length. Within 80 metres (260 ft) from the entrance, the cave's winter daytime temperature is normally 8–9 °C (46–48 °F), suitable for habitation in the harsh winters of the Tibetan Plateau.

== Religion ==
Baishiya Karst Cave is a Tibetan Buddhist sanctuary lying north of Trakkar Gompa ("Baishiya Temple," Báishíyá Sì, 白石崖寺). Said to be a former abode of Padmasambhava and the bodhisattva Tara, it is a popular location for monks to fast and meditate. It is also a pilgrimage site for Tibetan Buddhists and a tourist attraction. In 1982, the 10th Panchen Lama paid homage to the site. According to legend, the cave is more than 50 kilometres (31 mi) long and goes all the way to Xunhua County in Qinghai province.

== Fossils ==
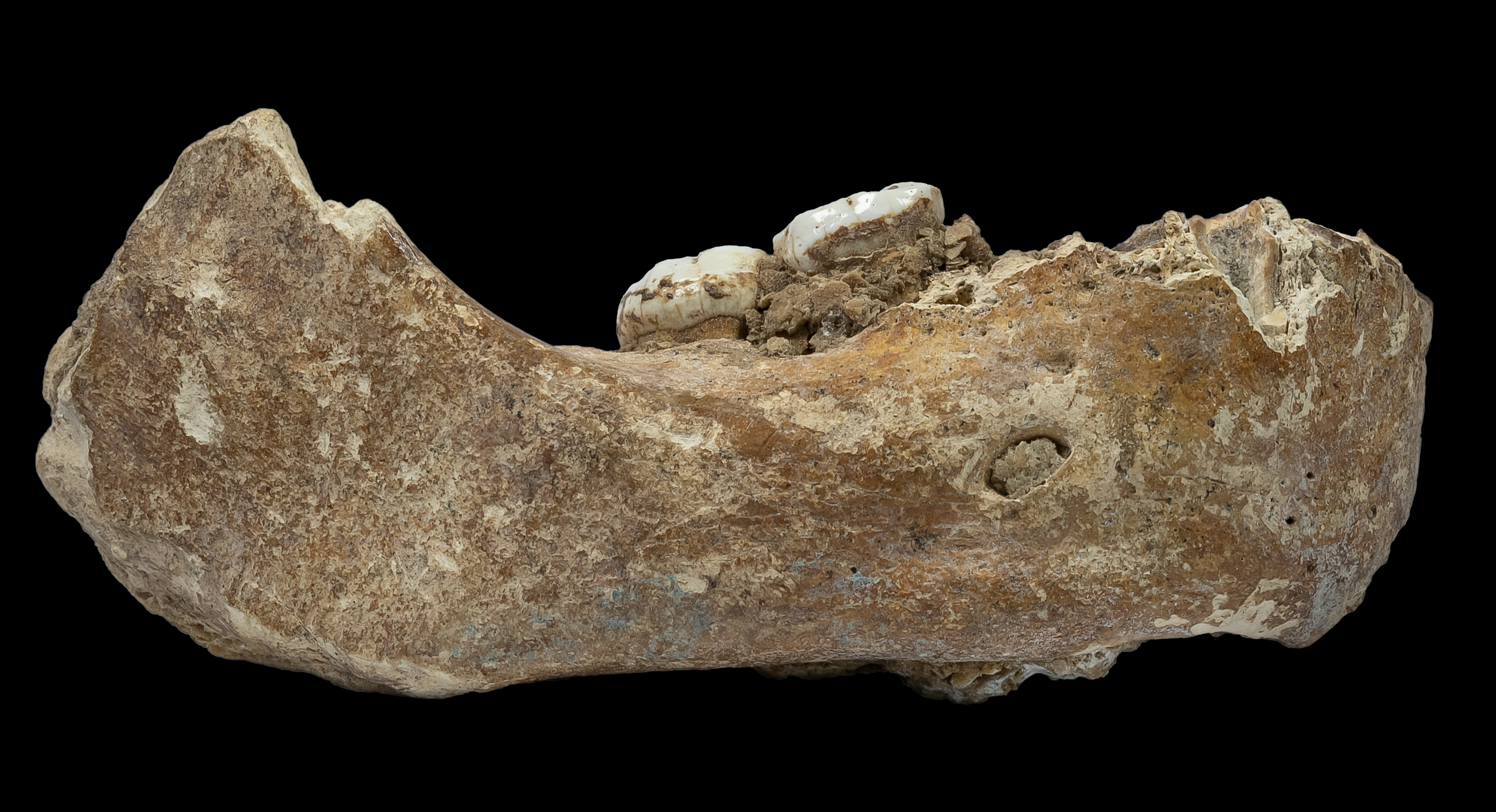
Xiahe mandible

In 1980, a Tibetan monk who was meditating in the cave discovered the Xiahe mandible. He passed the fossil to Jigme Tenpe Wangchug, the sixth Gungthang tulku, who donated it to Lanzhou University. The mandible was so unusual that researchers did not know how to classify it. Scientists Chen Fahu and Zhang Dongju began studying the site in 2010, while collaboration with the Max Planck Institute for Evolutionary Anthropology began in 2016. The first archaeological survey at the site was performed in 2016, while the first systematic excavation did not take place until 2018. Several lithic artefacts and animal bones with cut marks were discovered at the entrance to the cave.

In 2020 Denisovan DNA plus stone artefacts and animal bones were recovered from the Buddhist holy cave on the Tibetan Plateau by scientists from the University of Wollongong, Australia including Professor Bo Li. Denisovan DNA was recovered from four layers in the cave dated between 45.000 and 100,000 years ago. A fragment of jawbone had been found in the cave in 2019. Aboriginal Australians have about 5% of Denisovan DNA.

The Xiahe mandible consists of the right half of a partial mandible with two attached molars. A calcareous crust on the mandible was found to be about 165,000 years old by uranium-thorium dating. Material was drilled out of the teeth and six different collagen proteins were analyzed by mass spectrometry. This showed that the Xiahe specimen belonged to a population that was closely related to the Denisovan specimens from Denisova Cave. This is the first time that an ancient hominin was successfully identified using only protein analysis. It is the most complete known Denisovan fossil. Discover, Science News and Nova all named the discovery in their lists of Top Science Stories of 2019.
