= Xiahe mandible =

Hominin fossil

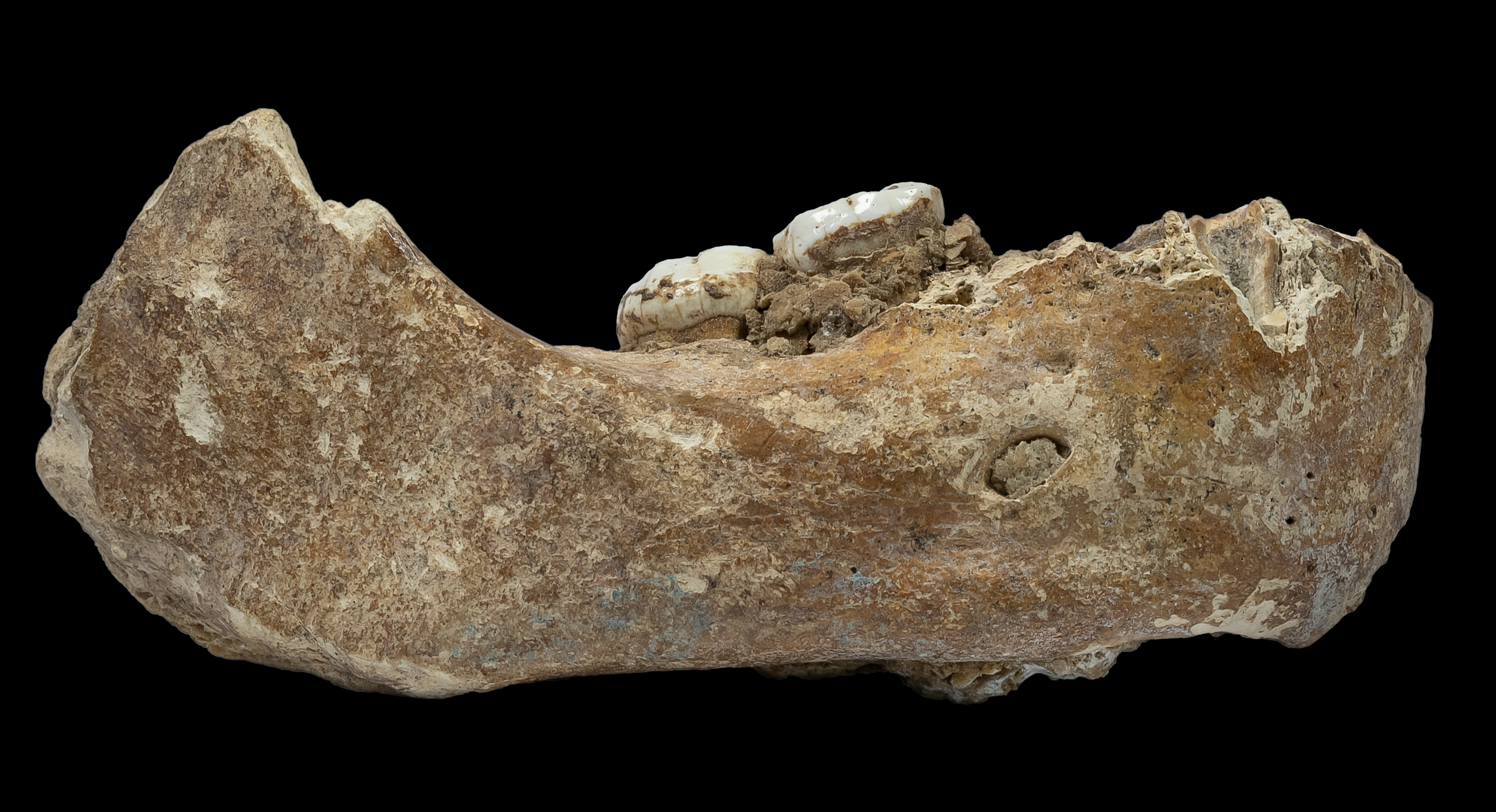
- Common name: Xiahe mandible
- Species: Denisovan
- Age: 160,000 years
- Place discovered: Gansu, China
- Date discovered: 1980

The Xiahe mandible ([ɕjâxɤ̌], sh'ya-khuh) is a hominin fossil jaw (mandible) discovered in Baishiya Karst Cave, located on the northeastern edge of the Tibetan Plateau in Xiahe County, Gansu, China. By the use of palaeoproteomic analysis, it is the first confirmed discovery of a Denisovan fossil outside of Denisova Cave, and was the most complete confirmed Denisovan fossil before the identification of the Homo longi holotype as a Denisovan. This fossil discovery shows that archaic hominins were present in a high-elevation, low-oxygen environment around 160,000 years ago. Discover, Science News and Nova all named the discovery of the mandible in their lists of Top Science Stories of 2019.

== History ==
Locations of Denisova Cave in the Altai Mountains of Siberia and Baishiya Karst Cave on the Tibetan Plateau. The two sites are 2,275 km (1,414 mi) apart.

The Xiahe mandible was discovered in 1980 in the Baishiya Karst Cave, located on the northeastern edge of the Tibetan Plateau in Xiahe County, Gansu, China. It was found by a Tibetan Buddhist monk who was meditating in the cave. He passed the bone to Jigme Tenpe Wangchug, the sixth Gungthang tulku, who recognized it as an important hominin fossil and gave it to geologist Dong Guangrong of Lanzhou University in the 1980s. Dong and his colleague Chen Fahu researched the mandible, but it was so unusual that they did not know how to classify it. As their research focus was geology and not palaeoanthropology, the fossil was overlooked for decades.

In 2010, Chen and his Ph.D. student Zhang Dongju began to study the bone together with Dong and surveyed a number of caves in the Xiahe area. As so much time had passed since its initial discovery, it took them six years to ascertain that the fossil came from Baishiya Karst Cave. As the cave is a Buddhist sanctuary, the excavation was further delayed by the need to obtain permits from the relevant religious and cultural authorities. In 2018, Zhang and her colleagues finally conducted a systematic excavation of the cave and discovered numerous Palaeolithic tools and animal bones bearing cut marks. The Lanzhou University team reached out to Jean-Jacques Hublin at the Max Planck Institute for Evolutionary Anthropology. Hublin and his Ph.D. student Frido Welker joined the research and helped identify the mandible as Denisovan using protein analysis.

== Findings ==
Recent human family tree

- - Neanderthals
  - - - Homo antecessor
      - - Jinniushan
        - - Hualong
          - - Dali
            - - Xiahe
              - Harbin
    - Modern humans

According to Ni et al. 2021 (note, Xiahe and Denisovans are most closely related to Neanderthals according to nDNA and ancient protein analyses by Chen et al. 2019.)

The Xiahe mandible consists of the right half of a partial mandible with two attached molars. The mandible was covered with a carbonate crust. Uranium-series dating of the carbonate crust places the mandible at over 160,000 years old. It predates Nwya Devu, hitherto the earliest known human presence in a high-elevation, low-oxygen environment, by about 120,000 years.

Researchers failed in their attempts to extract DNA from the fossil. However, they succeeded in identifying surviving ancient proteome in the dentine of one of the molars of the fossil; the Xiahe proteome shares a closest phylogenetic match to that of the high coverage Denisovan fossil from Denisova Cave, Denisova 3. Protein analysis also shows that the Xiahe mandible exhibits a single amino acid polymorphism, COL1α2 R996K, that is only shared by one other specimen on record, Denisova 3; this polymorphism is not found in any other ancient or modern reference population. The mandible also exhibits a single amino acid polymorphism, COL2α1 E583G, that is unique to itself. By way of protein analysis, researchers concluded that the Xiahe specimen belonged to a population that was closely related to the Denisovan specimens from Denisova Cave. This is the first time that an ancient hominin was successfully identified using only protein analysis. It was the most complete known Denisovan fossil until the assignment of the Harbin cranium to the Denisovans by mitochondrial DNA sequencing and proteomics. This fossil discovery adds supporting evidence for the notion that archaic hominins were successful in adapting to a high-elevation, low-oxygen environment.

The Xiahe mandible and its teeth exhibit general morphology that is typical of Middle Pleistocene hominin fossils. Researchers describe the mandible as being "very robust". The Xiahe mandible shares one obvious trait, large teeth, that is similar to the Denisovan fossils on record from Denisova Cave. The mandible also shows morphological similarities to some later East Asian fossils such as Penghu 1.

== Importance ==
Discover, Science News and Nova all named the discovery of the mandible in their lists of Top Science Stories of 2019.

== Sources ==
- Chen, Fahu; Welker, Frido; Shen, Chuan-Chou; Bailey, Shara E.; Bergmann, Inga; Davis, Simon; Xia, Huan; Wang, Hui; Fischer, Roman; Freidline, Sarah E.; Yu, Tsai-Luen; Skinner, Matthew M.; Stelzer, Stefanie; Dong, Guangrong; Fu, Qiaomei; Dong, Guanghui; Wang, Jian; Zhang, Dongju; Hublin, Jean-Jacques (1 May 2019). "A late Middle Pleistocene Denisovan mandible from the Tibetan Plateau" (PDF). Nature. 569 (7756). Springer Science and Business Media LLC: 409–412. Bibcode:2019Natur.569..409C. doi:10.1038/s41586-019-1139-x. ISSN 0028-0836. PMID 31043746. S2CID 141503768.
- Gibbons, Anne (1 May 2019). "First fossil jaw of Denisovans finally puts a face on elusive human relatives". Science | AAAS.
- He, Liping (2 May 2019). "中国学者领衔发现夏河丹尼索瓦人：16万年前登上青藏高原". The Paper (in Chinese).
- Hublin, Jean-Jacques (1 May 2019). "How We Found an Elusive Hominin in China". SAPIENS.
- "First hominins on the Tibetan Plateau were Denisovans". Max-Planck-Gesellschaft. 11 April 2019.
- Warren, Matthew (1 May 2019). "Biggest Denisovan fossil yet spills ancient human's secrets". Nature. 569 (7754): 16–17. Bibcode:2019Natur.569...16W. doi:10.1038/d41586-019-01395-0. PMID 31043736. S2CID 141503756.
- Wu, Bin (2 May 2019). "这块骨头来自一个神秘人种，证明16万年前古人类已登上青藏高原". Sohu (in Chinese).
