= Zhang Dongju =

Chinese archeologist

- Born: c. 1982
- Education: Lanzhou University (BA); Shandong University (PhD)
- Scientific career
- Fields: Archeology; Paleoanthropology
- Workplaces: Lanzhou University

Zhang Dongju (Chinese: 张东菊; pinyin: Zhāng Dōngjú; born c. 1982) is a Chinese archeologist and an associate professor at the College of Earth and Environmental Sciences of Lanzhou University. Zhang's research determined that the Xiahe mandible found in the Baishiya Karst Cave on the Tibetan Plateau shared DNA with fossilized remains found in the Denisova Cave in Siberia. This moved to 120,000 years earlier the dates of earliest proven hominin activities in the Tibetan Plateau, and revealed for the first time that the Denisovan hominins had spread throughout Asia rather than being located only near the Denisova Cave. Zhang's work is considered likely to prompt reconsideration of other fossil remains using ancient protein analysis. Discover, Science News, and Nova all named the discovery to their lists of top science stories of 2019.

== Education ==
Zhang studied at Shandong University from 2000 to 2004 and graduated with a bachelor's degree in archeology. From September 2004, she pursued graduate studies at Lanzhou University, where she joined the group of climatologist Chen Fahu. Zhang's main research focus was on the Paleolithic sites of the Loess Plateau. She was a visiting scholar in the Department of Anthropology at the University of California, Los Angeles in the United States from January 2008 to September 2009, and then at Römisch-Germanisches Zentralmuseum in Germany from October 2009 to March 2010. She earned her PhD in physical geography from Lanzhou University in December 2010.

== Research ==
Locations of Denisova Cave in the Altai Mountains of Siberia and Baishiya Karst Cave on the Tibetan Plateau

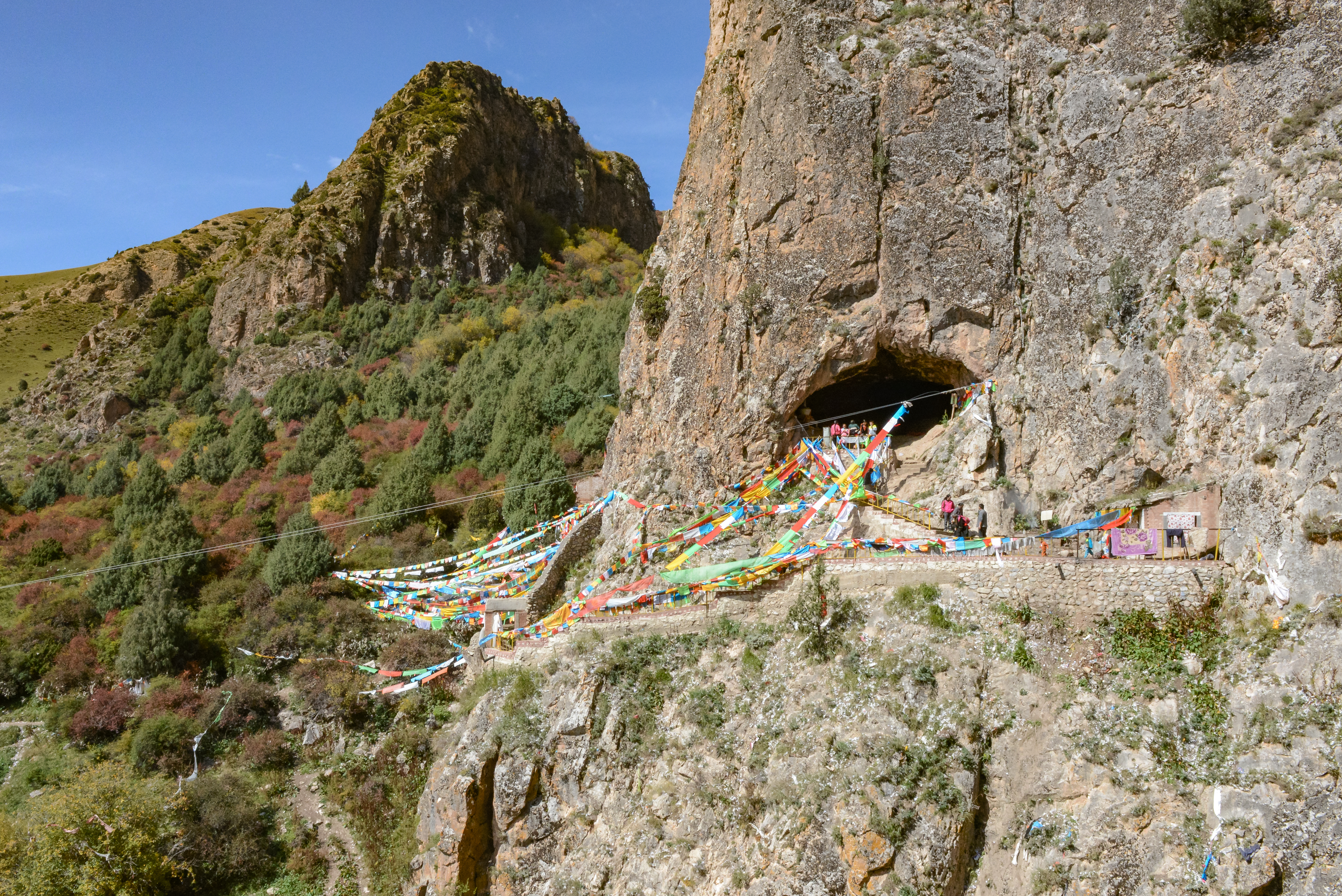
Baishya Karst cave

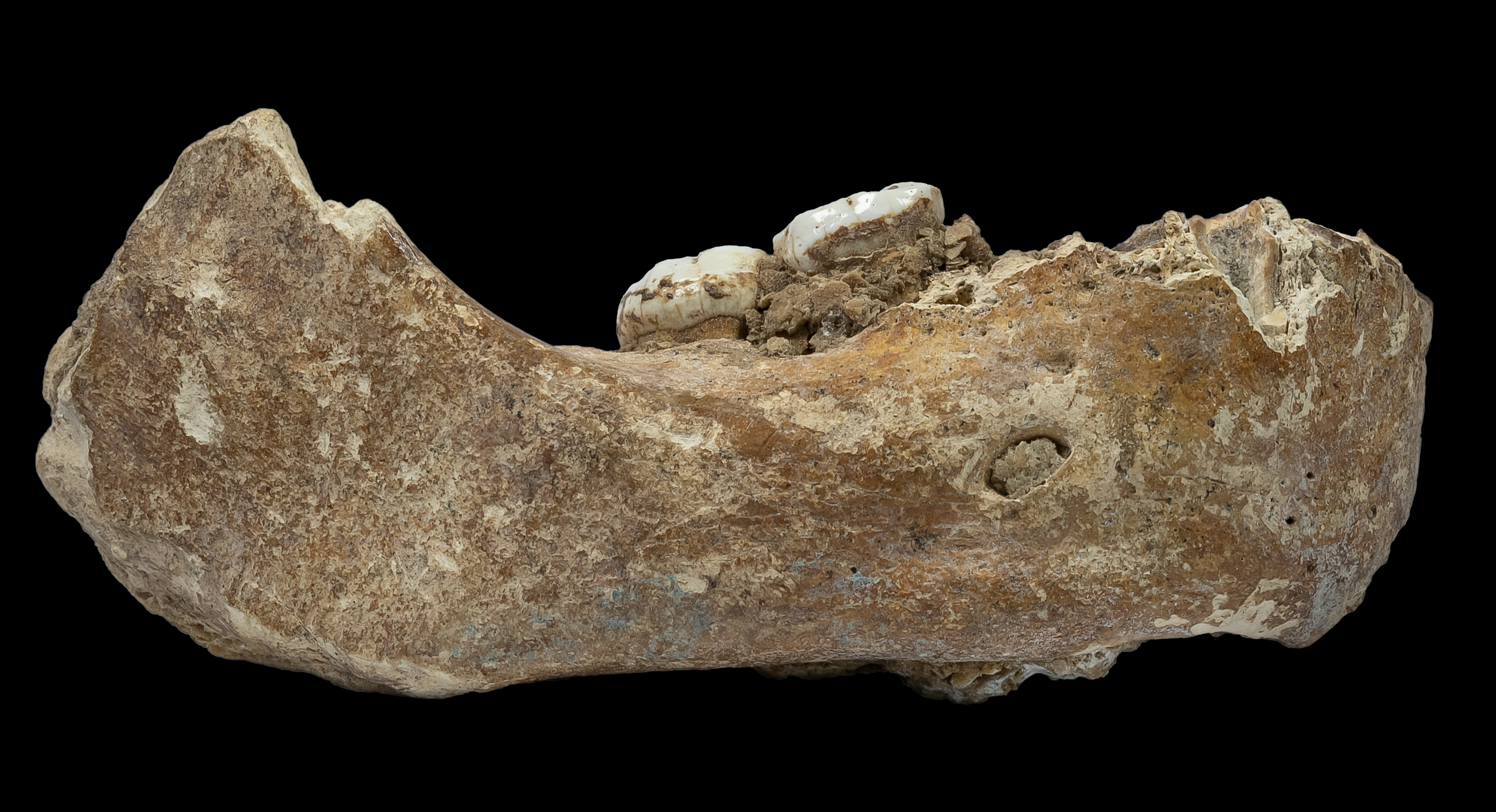
Xiahe mandible

After earning her PhD, Zhang joined the faculty of environmental archeology at Lanzhou University. Zhang changed her research direction from the Loess Plateau to the Tibetan Plateau and began to study the Xiahe mandible, together with her former advisor Chen Fahu. The Xiahe mandible is a fossilized jawbone found in 1980 by a monk in the Baishiya Karst Cave, which is located in Xiahe County on the northeastern edge of the Tibetan Plateau, 2,250 kilometres (1,400 mi) from the Denisova Cave where the only other known Denisovan remains have been found. It was donated to Lanzhou University. According to Zhang, the mandible was so "weird" that Lanzhou researchers could not classify it, and it was overlooked for thirty years.

Zhang investigated the original discovery of the mandible by interviewing local people in Xiahe. They confirmed human bones were found in the cave. When asked in 2019 whether it was possible the story was false, Zhang said, "I don't think the local people would lie about this." Because the provenance is uncertain, the research team in 2019 acknowledged they could not prove the fossil came from the Baishaya cave. But they were able to match minerals on the Xiahe mandible to mineral deposits in the cave.

The mandible contained no productive DNA, but in the dentine of the teeth they found collagen proteins. In 2016 Zhang and colleagues started working with Jean-Jacques Hublin of the Max Planck Institute to use ancient protein analysis.

In 2016, local villagers and Buddhists gave Zhang permission to start archeological work within the cave, which is a Buddhist sanctuary. With local permission she led a team to begin excavation in and around the cave in 2018. The team dug two trenches in which they found animal bones with cut marks and a large number of stone tools. In 2019 Zhang told Science, "We do hope we'll find more Denisovans."

=== Importance and impact ===
Denisovan DNA is found in modern humans across Asia and Australasia, but Zhang's work connecting the Xiahe mandible to the Denisovans is the first evidence that Denisovans lived anywhere but in the Denisova Cave area. It is also the first evidence they lived at high altitudes, as the Denisova Cave is only 2,300 feet (700 meters) above sea level. The Baishiya cave is 10,760 feet (3,280 meters) above sea level. Denisovan DNA, specifically the EPAS1 allele, has been considered to be what allows Sherpas and Tibetans to live at high altitudes in low-oxygen environments. The Xiahe mandible is considered likely to be the oldest hominin fossil on the Tibetan Plateau. Zhang told The Paper "this study will push the history of prehistoric human activities on the Qinghai-Tibet Plateau from 40,000 years ago to 160,000 years ago."

Zhang's classification of the Xiahe mandible as Denisovan is likely to cause scientists to reconsider the classification of other remains using the methods Zhang and her colleagues used.

Discover, Science News and Nova all named the discovery in their lists of Top Science Stories of 2019.

== Publications ==
- Zhang, Dongju; Xia, Huan; Chen, Fahu (2018). "Early human occupation of the Tibetan Plateau". SCIB. 63 (24): 1598–1600. Bibcode:2018SciBu..63.1598Z. doi:10.1016/j.scib.2018.12.004. ISSN 2095-9273. OCLC 7959387479.
- 董, 广辉; 张, 帆宇; 刘, 峰文; 张, 东菊; 周, 爱锋; 杨, 谊时; GongHui, WANG (2018). 喇家遗址史前灾害与黄河大洪水无关. Scientia Sinica Terrae. 48 (4): 467–475. doi:10.1360/N072017-00026. ISSN 1674-7240. OCLC 7547370656.
- Zhang, Dongju; Zhang, Naimeng; Wang, Jian; Ha, Bibu; Dong, Guanghui; Chen, Fahu (2017). "Comment on "Permanent human occupation of the central Tibetan Plateau in the early Holocene"". Science. 357 (6351) eaam8273. doi:10.1126/science.aam8273. ISSN 0036-8075. OCLC 7117616203. PMID 28798102.
- Zhang, DongJu; Dong, GuangHui; Wang, Hui; Ren, XiaoYan; Ha, PiPu'u; Qiang, MingRui; Chen, FaHu (2016). "History and possible mechanisms of prehistoric human migration to the Tibetan Plateau". Science China Earth Sciences. 59 (9): 1765–1778. Bibcode:2016ScChD..59.1765Z. doi:10.1007/s11430-015-5482-x. ISSN 1674-7313. OCLC 6798033136. S2CID 132664906.
- 陈, 发虎; 任, 晓燕; 王, 辉; 哈, 比布; 董, 广辉; 强, 明瑞; 张, 东菊 (2016). 史前人类向青藏高原扩散的历史过程和可能驱动机制. Scientia Sinica Terrae. 46 (8): 1007–1023. doi:10.1360/N072015-00482. ISSN 1674-7240. OCLC 6826587417.
- Chen, F. H., Dong, G. H., Zhang, D. J., Liu, X. Y., Jia, X., An, C. B., Ma, M. M., Xie, Y. W., Barton, L., Ren, X. Y., Zhao, Z. J., Wu, X. H. & Jones, M. K. (2015). "Agriculture facilitated permanent human occupation of the Tibetan Plateau after 3600 BP." Science, 347: 248–250.
- ZHANG, Dongju; CHEN, Fahu (2013). "A Review of Paleolithic Environmental Archaeology in North China". Marine Geology & Quaternary Geology. 33 (4): 55. Bibcode:2013MGQG...33...55Z. doi:10.3724/SP.J.1140.2013.04055. ISSN 0256-1492. OCLC 5812784770.
- Zhang, Dongju (2012). "Paleolithic archaeology and human adaptation during the Upper Pleistocene in North China". Quaternary International. 559: 279–280. Bibcode:2012QuInt.279T.559Z. doi:10.1016/j.quaint.2012.08.2075. ISSN 1040-6182. OCLC 5903165229.
- Morgan C, Barton L, Bettinger R, Chen FH, Zhang DJ. (2011). "Glacial Cycles and Palaeolithic Adaptive Variability on China's Western Loess Plateaux." Antiquity. 85:369-379.
- Elston R, Dong GH, Zhang DJ, (2011). "Late Pleistocene intensification technologies in Northern China." Quaternary International. 242: 401–405.
- Zhang DJ, Chen FH, Bettinger RL, Barton L, Ji DX, Morgan C, Wang H, Cheng XZ, Dong GH, Guiderson TP, Zhao H. (2010). "Archaeological records of Dadiwan in the past 60 ka and the origin of millet agriculture." Chinese Science Bulletin, 55 (16): 1636–1642.(en)
- Zhang, DongJu; Chen, FaHu; Bettinger, R. L; Barton, L; Ji, DuXue; Morgan, C; Wang, Hui; Cheng, XiaoZhong; Dong, GuangHui (2010). "Archaeological records of Dadiwan in the past 60 ka and the origin of millet agriculture". Chin. Sci. Bull. 55 (16): 1636–1642. Bibcode:2010ChSBu..55.1636Z. doi:10.1007/s11434-010-3097-4. ISSN 1001-6538. OCLC 5126341496. S2CID 27241849.
- Bettinger RL, Barton L, Morgan C, Chen FH, Wang H, Guilderson TP, Ji DX, Zhang DJ. (2010). "The Transition to Agriculture at Dadiwan, People's Republic of China." Current Anthropology, 51 (5): 703–714.
