= Yao Tandong =

Chinese glaciologist

- Born: July 1954 (age 72); Tongwei County, Gansu, China
- Education: Lanzhou University
- Scientific career
- Fields: Glaciology
- Workplaces: Chinese Academy of Sciences (CAS)
- Doctoral advisor: Li Jijun

Chinese name
- Traditional Chinese: 姚檀棟
- Simplified Chinese: 姚檀栋
Transcriptions
Standard Mandarin
- Hanyu Pinyin: Yáo Tándòng

Yao Tandong (Chinese: 姚檀栋; pinyin: Yáo Tándòng; born July 1954) is a Chinese glaciologist, a member of the Chinese Academy of Sciences (CAS). He served as director of the CAS Institute of Tibetan Plateau Research (ITP) in Beijing.

== Biography ==
Yao was born in July 1954 in Tongwei County, Gansu. He received his B.S. in 1978 and MS in 1982 both from the Department of Geography, Lanzhou University in Gansu, China. He received his PhD from the Institute of Geographic Sciences and Natural Resources Research (IGSNRR), Chinese Academy of Sciences (CAS) in 1986. He worked as post-doctor in France and the USA from 1987 to 1990.

== Career ==
He worked at Cold and Arid Regions Environmental and Engineering Research Institute (CAREERI), CAS, which was formerly known as Lanzhou Institute of Glaciology and Geocryology, from 1990 to 2003 and was deputy director of the institute from 1995 to 2000 and director from 2000 to 2003. He has been director of the Institute of Tibetan Plateau Research (ITP), CAS since its founding in 2003.

Yao received awards for his research including the Natural Science Award and the Ho Leung Ho Lee Prize. He was recognized by the Science Association of China with a "Distinguished Scientist of China" award in 2005. Yao was elected to the Chinese Academy of Sciences in 2007.
