= School of Life Sciences =

School of Life Sciences may refer to:

- School of Life Sciences, EPFL, a part of the École Polytechnique Fédérale de Lausanne, Switzerland
- School of Life Sciences, Kannur University, Kerala, India
- School of Life Sciences, Lanzhou University, China
- School of Life Sciences (Central South University), Changsha, Hunan, China
- School of Life Sciences (University of Dundee), Scotland
