= European Society for the Study of Human Evolution =

European Society for the study of Human Evolution (ESHE)
- Society logo
- Abbreviation: ESHE
- Formation: 2011
- Legal status: Non-profit organisation
- Purpose: Human evolution
- Location: Tübingen, Germany
- Region served: Europe
- President: Katerina Harvati 2020 - Present; Jean-Jacques Hublin 2011-2020
- Website: eshe.eu

The European Society for the study of Human Evolution (ESHE) is a non-profit organization whose intention is to promote the fields of research that are involved in the investigation into the biological and cultural evolution of humans. This broad field of research comprises, among other disciplines, human palaeontology or paleoanthropology, paleogenetics, palaeolithic archaeology, and palaeogeography. The society was officially established in 2011 in Leipzig, Germany, as a non-profit organization under German law. Following the 2020 elections, the society is currently located in Tübingen, Germany. The current president of the society is professor Dr. Katerina Harvati, Director of the Department of Paleoanthropology at the University of Tübingen.

The main goals of the society are to stimulate and facilitate communication and scientific collaboration between researchers and scientists involved in the study of human evolution, primarily through the organization of conferences, which are held annually in the second half of September. ESHE is dedicated to supporting activities which encourage new and innovative research in the field of human evolution and is in particular supports the research of young scientists.

== Meetings ==
Each year, ESHE hosts an annual meeting to showcase interdisciplinary research on human evolution from around the world. These meetings are held in the second half of September, and take place in a different European city each year. The inaugural ESHE meeting was held in the society's past headquarters in Leipzig, Germany at the Max Planck Institute for Evolutionary Anthropology. Since then, the meetings have been held in Bordeaux, Vienna, Florence, London, Madrid, Leiden, Faro, Liège, while the 2020 and 2021 meetings where held online due to the Corona pandemic. Each year, the members of the board collaborate with local organisation teams to deliver a 3-day conference. The conference consists of poster, podium and PechaKucha sessions.

In 2019, a largely-anonymous group of younger researchers pledged to boycott the annual meeting in protest of alleged sexual and professional misconduct by society past president Jean-Jacques Hublin. Hublin denied the allegations.

== Board members ==
The board members are critical to the function of the society. The Board consists of 5 board officers and up to 12 additional regular board members. The board officers are members of the Society and academic professionals employed in the European Union (EU) in the fields of research outlined in the preamble. The board officers serve a three-year term and are elected by the general assembly. The regular board members serve a 2-year term and are elected by the general assembly.
