= Li Jijun =

Chinese geographer (1933–2020)

- Born: 9 October 1933; Pengzhou, Sichuan, China
- Died: 21 July 2020 (aged 86); Lanzhou, Gansu, China
- Education: Nanjing University
- Scientific career
- Fields: geography geomorphology
- Workplaces: Lanzhou University
- Doctoral students: Chen Fahu; Yao Tandong

Chinese name
- Chinese: 李吉均
Transcriptions
Standard Mandarin
- Hanyu Pinyin: Lǐ Jíjūn

Li Jijun (Chinese: 李吉均; pinyin: Lǐ Jíjūn, October 9, 1933 – July 21, 2020) was a Chinese geographer and geomorphologist.

== Biography ==
Born in Pengzhou, Sichuan, Li graduated from the Geography Department of Nanjing University in 1956. In 1991, he was elected as a member of the Chinese Academy of Sciences (academician). He was a professor of Geography Department of Lanzhou University and a Dean of the Geography Department of Lanzhou University. Three of his students, Chen Fahu, Qin Dahe and Yao Tandong, were also elected academicians of the Chinese Academy of Sciences.

== Honours and awards ==
- 1991 Member of the Chinese Academy of Sciences (CAS)
