= Penghu 1 =

Hominin fossil

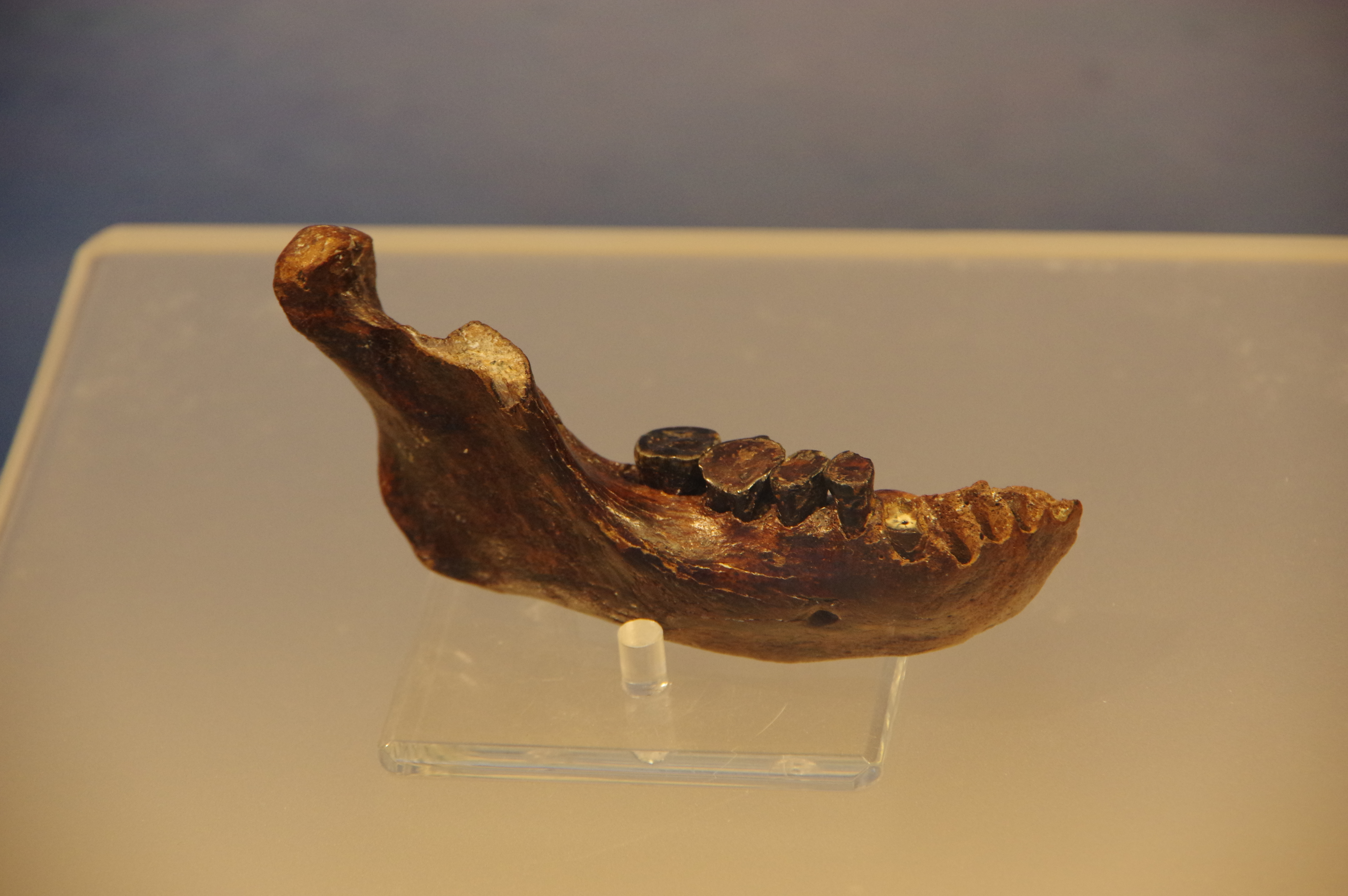
- Penghu 1 on display
- Common name: Penghu 1
- Species: Denisovan ( Homo sp. )
- Age: c. 100,000 years
- Place discovered: Taiwan Strait, Pacific Ocean
- Date discovered: before 2008

Penghu 1 is a fossil jaw (mandible) belonging to an extinct hominin species of the genus Homo. It was collected from seafloor sediments of the Penghu Channel off the coast of Taiwan, dating to sometime in the Middle Pleistocene or Late Pleistocene. The classification of the mandible was historically disputed. Analysis of protein sequences in 2025 confirmed that the mandible represented that of a male Denisovan.

== History and discovery ==
The fossil was recovered sometime before 2008 by fishermen working in the Penghu Channel between the Penghu Islands and mainland Taiwan and acquired by Tainan citizen Kun-Yu Tsai. The fossil was found 60–120 meters below the water's surface and about 25 kilometers off the western coast of Taiwan in an area which was once part of the mainland. Sea levels have risen since the last ice age and in consequence have submerged the area where the fossil was recovered. After Tsai donated the fossil to the National Museum of Natural Science, it was described in 2015 by an international team of Japanese, Taiwanese, and Australian scientists.

Penghu 1 is currently housed at the National Museum of Natural Science in Taichung. The fossil is stratigraphically dated to younger than 450 kya, based on prehistoric sea-level lowering to either between 190 and 130 kya, or to between 70 and 10 kya.

In his 2015 self-published digital book, Mark McMenamin proactively proposed the species name "Homo tsaichangensis", but this binomen is considered to be unpublished and unavailable as of 2025. While the work is registered with Zoobank, the digital book itself doesn't contain evidence of ZooBank registration, failing to meet the International Code of Zoological Nomenclature (ICZN) articles 8.5.3.1 and 8.5.3.2. It is also uncertain whether numerous identical and durable copies (i.e. print versions) of the book were ever widely available as required by ICZN article 8.1.3.1.

== Fossil morphology ==
The fossil consists of a nearly complete right lower jaw with four teeth, including worn molars and premolars. The mandible has a high index of robustness, a robust lateral torus, large molars, and with the help of 3D reconstruction it was revealed to have a large bicondylar breadth. These features help confirm that the fossil was from the middle-late Pleistocene era. The alveoli of its four incisors and right canine have been preserved as well showing their great length. The specimen was assigned to the genus Homo based on its jaw and tooth morphology. The mandible shows a receding anterior surface and lacks a pronounced chin which has helped distinguish it from the species Homo sapiens. However, the fossil exhibited derived traits similar to early Homo habilis including the shortness and width of its jaw. These and other characteristics such as the agenesis of the M3 molar have been sufficient evidence to classify the specimen of the genus Homo.

== Classification ==
Although the genus of the Penghu 1 has been widely accepted, there is much discussion on the potential species of the specimen. The Penghu 1 mandible has been described as most similar to Hexian fossils of Homo erectus. Both Penghu 1 and the Hexian mandible share a similar crown size, mandibular prominence, and general robustness. As a result of these similarities and their late presence in Eastern Asia, the authors of "The first Archaic Homo of Taiwan" proposed several models for their existence. The features the mandibles shared could be explained by either the retention of primitive characteristics of early Asian Homo erectus, a migration of Homo with robust jaws from Africa, inclusion in the species Homo heidelbergensis, or they could have been an adapted form of Homo erectus. However, the species identity or taxonomic relationships lack consensus due to limited material. Co-author Yousuke Kaifu cautioned that additional skeletal parts are needed before species evaluation. Chinese anthropologists Xinzhi Wu and Haowen Tong did not agree with the naming of a new species, tentatively assigning the mandible to archaic Homo sapiens, leaving open the possibility of elevating it to a distinct species should more fossils be discovered.

In 2019, Chen Fahu along with a group of co-authors presented a piece suspecting the Penghu 1 mandible to belong to a Denisovan. This conclusion has been supported through its comparison with the Denisovan Xiahe mandible. The Xiahe mandible was discovered on the Tibetan Plateau and is dated to be around 160,000 years old. The Xiahe specimen has similar dental morphology compared to Penghu 1. They share 4 distinct characteristics: their M2's are close in mesiodistal width, they both show the agenesis of the M3 molar, they have a similar unique M2 root structure which relates to modern Asian populations, and the P3 displays Tomes' root, which is rarely found in other fossil hominins.

Wu & Bae (2024) assigned Penghu 1 to the new species Homo juluensis, as Xujiayao hominin, Xiahe mandible and Denisovans.

A 2025 proteomic analysis study confirmed that the remains represented those of a male Denisovan.

== Paleoecology ==
Other fossil animals trawled from Pleistocene aged Penghu Channel deposits include cave hyenas (Crocuta crocuta ultima), tigers, brown bears, raccoon dogs (Nyctereutes procyonoides), the extinct large elephant Palaeoloxodon huaihoensis, wild horses (Equus ferus), the extinct buffaloes Bubalus teilhardi and Bubalus youngi, Père David's deer (Elaphurus davidianus), deer belonging to the genus Cervus, pigs (Sus sp. perhaps the wild boar Sus scrofa), Chinese pond turtle, the Yangtze giant softshell turtle (previously under the synoynm Trionyx liupani) and Chinese alligator. At the time at which Penghu-1 lived, the Taiwan Strait was largely exposed as dry land due to the large amount of water locked up as terrestrial ice during glacial periods, with the now submerged landscape of the Penghu Channel is thought to have been a grassland crossed with river channels ultimately forming an extension of the Min River of mainland Fujian and rivers of western Taiwan.

== See also ==
- Dispersal of Homo erectus
- Prehistory of Taiwan
