= School of Life Sciences, Lanzhou University =

- 兰州大学生命科学学院
- Motto: 秉德维新、务本求真
- Established: 1999; 27 years ago
- Location: Lanzhou, China
- Website: lifesc.lzu.edu.cn

The School of Life Sciences, Lanzhou University was established in 1999.

== History ==
- In 1946, Professor Xin Shuzhi, then president, and Professor Dong Shuangqiu and Chang Linding established the Department of Botany and Zoology of Lanzhou University.
- In 1951, The Departments of Botany and Zoology merged into the Department of Biology.
- In 1999, The Department of Biology, the Laboratory of Cytology, the Laboratory of Plant Physiology directly under the Ministry of Education, and the State Key Laboratory of Arid Agroecology were merged into the School of Life Sciences.

== Offers majors ==
Lanzhou University School of Life Sciences currently has three majors: biological science, biotechnology, and bioinformatics.

== Scientific research ==
- Discovery of a protein phosphatase that regulates autophagy in plant cells.
- Reveal drought adaptation of common desert plants.
- Pb induced mitochondrial fission of fibroblast cells via ATM activation.

== Staff ==
The school currently has 134 faculty members, including 95 full-time teachers (34 professors, 10 junior research fellows, 40 associate professors and 11 lecturers), 24 laboratory technicians and 15 Party affairs and administrative logistics staff.

== Famous alumni ==
- Shu Hongbing, an academician of the Chinese Academy of Sciences, served as Dean of the School of Life Sciences of Wuhan University from 2005 to 2013, and President of Wuhan University from 2013 to 2022.
- Yang Weicai, an academician of the Chinese Academy of Sciences.
