= Yang Weicai =

Chinese plant molecular geneticist

Yang Weicai (born February 14, 1964) is a Chinese plant molecular geneticist, and academician of the Chinese Academy of Sciences. They are currently the director and researcher of the Institute of Genetics and Developmental Biology, Chinese Academy of Sciences, and vice chairman of the Chinese Genetics Society.
