= Shi Yafeng =

Chinese geographer and glaciologist

Shi Yafeng (simplified Chinese: 施雅风; traditional Chinese: 施雅風; March 21, 1919 – February 13, 2011) was a Chinese geographer and glaciologist. He was an academician of the Chinese Academy of Sciences. He was an expert on geography and glaciology, and regarded as the "Father of Chinese Glaciology".

== Life ==
Shi was born in Haimen, Jiangsu on March 21, 1919. He did his undergraduate and postgraduate studies both at Zhejiang University. He led the Batoula Glacier Investigation Team, Glaciology and Geocryology Institute of Chinese Academe Science in 1978, which was the first modern Chinese team to systematically investigate glaciers.

He was a researcher, vice-director, director, honorary director of the Lanzhou Glacier Frozen Earth Institute, Chinese Academy of Sciences.

== Works ==
- monograph: Glacier Conspectus of China (Shi et al., 1988)
- monograph: Glaciers and Glacial Geomorphology in China (Shi, 1992)
