= Qiaomei Fu =

Chinese Paleontologist and researcher

- Born: 24 March 1982 (age 44); Jiangxi, China
- Occupations: Paleontologist, Researcher
- Known for: Director of the ancient DNA laboratory at the Institute of Vertebrate Paleontology and Paleoanthropology in Beijing

Qiaomei Fu (Jiangxi, People's Republic of China, 1982) is a Chinese Paleontologist and researcher. She is the director of the ancient DNA laboratory at the Institute of Vertebrate Paleontology and Paleoanthropology in Beijing. Her research focuses on the first modern humans who settled in Asia, where they may have arrived more than 100,000 years ago.

== Biography ==
Qiaomei Fu was born in Jiangxi Province, China, next to Poyang Lake in 1983. From a very young age, she showed an interest in science. She received her Master's degree in Archaeological science from the Chinese Academy of Sciences in 2009.

In 2009, she joined the Max Planck Institute for Evolutionary Anthropology in Leipzig, Germany, directed by the Swedish geneticist Svante Pääbo, to write her doctoral thesis. She completed her thesis on the genomics of ancient humans in 2013. She then joined the genetics department at Harvard Medical School in Boston as a postdoctoral researcher in the team of American professor David Reich, a geneticist of ancient human populations.In this laboratory, she succeeded in sequencing the oldest Homo sapiens DNA recorded outside of Africa and the Near East.

== Works ==
At Harvard she published several articles reviewing the history of early European humans (contributing to the ancestry of contemporary Europeans).
