= Katerina Harvati =

Greek paleoanthropologist

- Κατερίνα Χαρβάτη
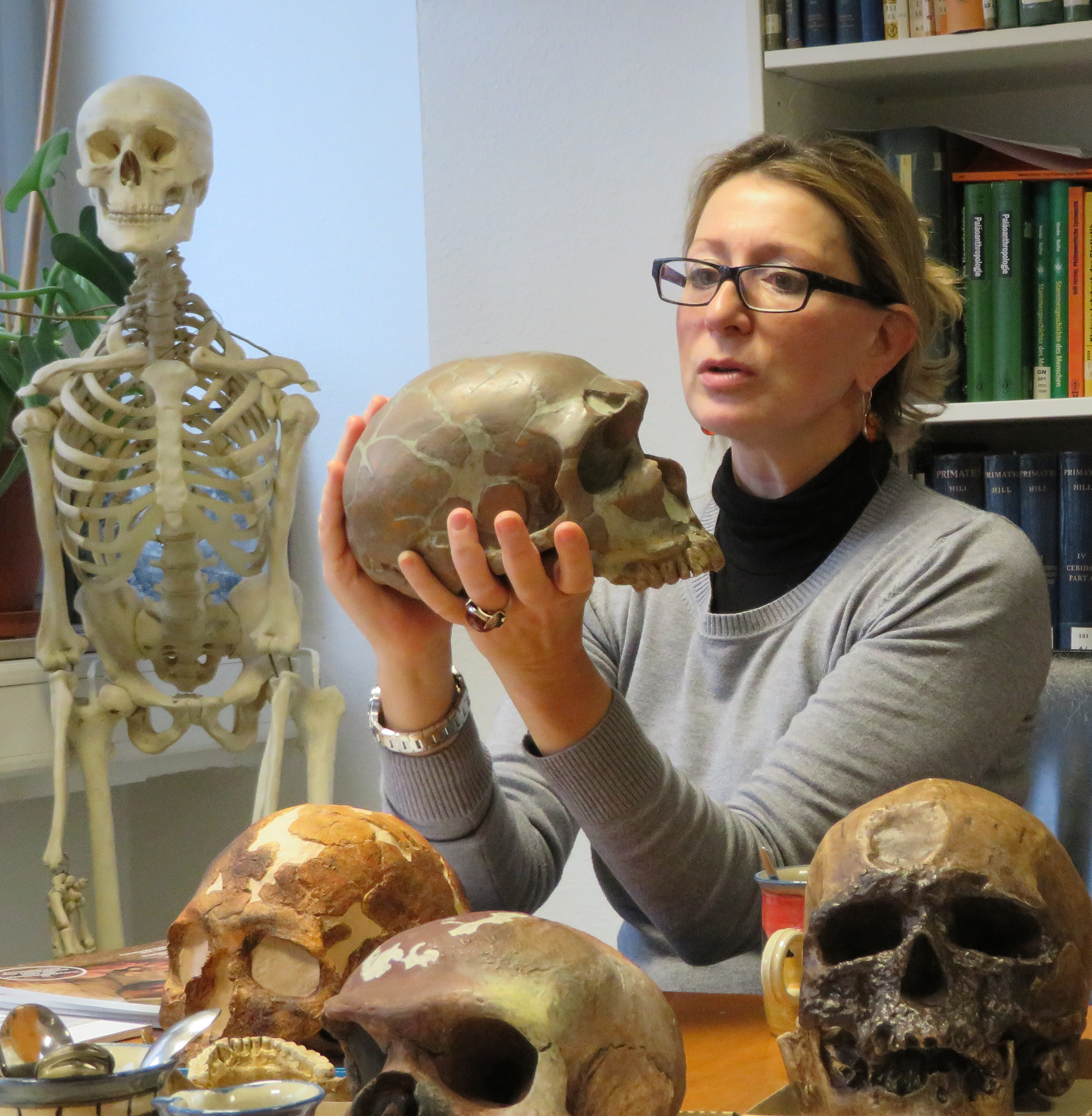
- Born: 1970 (age 55–56)
- Education: Columbia College (B.A.); Hunter College (M.A.); CUNY Graduate Center (PhD)
- Known for: Identification of the remains of the earliest known Homo sapiens outside of Africa in the Apidima Cave, Greece
- Awards: Gottfried Wilhelm Leibniz Prize 2021 Three ERC Grants
- Scientific career
- Fields: Paleoanthropology
- Workplaces: University of Tübingen
- Doctoral advisor: Eric Delson

Katerina Harvati (Greek: Κατερίνα Χαρβάτη; born 1970 in Athens) is a Greek paleoanthropologist and expert in human evolution. She specializes in the broad application of 3-D geometric morphometric and virtual anthropology methods to paleoanthropology. Since 2009, she is full professor and director of Paleoanthropology at the University of Tübingen, Germany. From 2020 to 2023 she was Director of the Institute for Archaeological Sciences and since 2023 she is Director of the Senckenberg Centre for Human Evolution and Palaeoenvironment, both at the University of Tübingen.

== Life ==
Harvati is a graduate of Columbia College, New York, where she earned a B.A. in Anthropology 1994 (summa cum laude). Four years later, she received her master's degree in Anthropology at Hunter College, City University of New York (CUNY). After having been awarded with her Ph.D. at the CUNY Graduate Center in 2001, she worked as a tenure-track assistant professor at New York University.

== Career ==
From 2004 to 2009, she was senior researcher at the Max Planck Institute for Evolutionary Anthropology in Leipzig, Germany. In 2005, she also became adjunct associate professor at the CUNY Graduate Center. In 2009 she was appointed full professor at the University of Tübingen and director of Section of Paleoanthropology. In 2010, she was elected fellow of the American Association for the Advancement of Science for her contributions to Paleoanthropology.

== Research ==
Harvati's research focuses on primate and human evolution as well as on evolutionary theory, with emphasis on the paleobiology of Pleistocene humans and on modern human origins. She has conducted fieldwork in different parts of Europe and Africa and contributed largely to the understanding of the relationship of morphological variability to population history and the environment. Her recent work on the fossil human remains from Apidima Cave, Southern Greece, pushed back the arrival of Homo sapiens in Europe by more than 150 thousand years, showing an earlier and much more geographically widespread early modern human dispersal than was previously known (Harvati et al. 2019 Nature). This work was listed as one of the most important discoveries of the year by The Guardian, Discover Magazine and LiveScience, as well as one of the most important archaeological discoveries of the decade by Gizmodo. She also led research overthrowing long held assumptions about increased levels of violence and traumatic injuries relative to modern humans (Beier et al. 2018) and pioneered work exploring the effects of hybridization on the early modern human cranial phenotype (Harvati and Ackermann 2022). Other contributions include the assessment of the Neanderthal species status (Harvati et al. 2004 PNAS), the identification of an early modern human in Southern Africa (Grine et al. 2007 Science; a publication that TIME magazine ranked as one out of Top Ten discoveries of the year); and the demonstration that modern humans evolved much earlier than previously thought, around 300,000 years ago in Morocco (Hublin et al. 2017, Nature). Finally, Harvati's work has spearheaded paleolithic and paleoanthropological research in South-East Europe (Harvati and Roskandic 2016). She has received three European Research Council grants, an ERC Starting Grant in 2011, an ERC Consolidator Grant in 2016 and an ERC Advanced Grant in 2021. Together with G. Jäger, she heads a Centre for Advanced Studies on linguistic, cultural and biological trajectories of the human past since 2015.

In 2026, Harvarti and colleagues published new evidence of modified wood tools at Marathousa 1, an excavation site about 4km west of Megalopoli, Greece. The site is dated to the interglacial period MIS12, or around 430 kya. The objects are dated by association with the site, as although they are organic, the limit of radiocarbon dating organic materials is around 50 kya. If accurate, this makes the artifacts the oldest yet documented wood tools by a substantial margin, notably preceding the onset of anatomically modern humans.

== Personal life ==
Harvati is married to the Greek biotechnology executive Elias Papatheodorou. They have two children.

== Awards and distinctions ==
- 2009 Hellenes Abroad Award – Woman of the year 2009, Europe
- 2014 Research Prize of Baden-Württemberg for basic research
- 2021 Leibniz Prize of the German Research Foundation (DFG)

== Publications ==
- Roditi, Effrosyni; Bocherens, Hervé; Konidaris, George E.; Athanassiou, Athanassios; Tourloukis, Vangelis; Karkanas, Panagiotis; Panagopoulou, Eleni; Harvati, Katerina (16 January 2024). "Life-history of Palaeoloxodon antiquus reveals Middle Pleistocene glacial refugium in the Megalopolis basin, Greece". Scientific Reports. 14 (1): 1390. Bibcode:2024NatSR..14.1390R. doi:10.1038/s41598-024-51592-9. PMC 10791645. PMID 38228659.
- Harvati, K.; Ackermann, R. R. (5 September 2022). "Merging morphological and genetic evidence to assess hybridization in Western Eurasian late Pleistocene hominins". Nature Ecology & Evolution. 6 (10): 1573–1585. Bibcode:2022NatEE...6.1573H. doi:10.1038/s41559-022-01875-z. PMID 36064759.
- Harvati, Katerina; Reyes-Centeno, Hugo (2022-12-01). "Evolution of Homo in the Middle and Late Pleistocene". Journal of Human Evolution. 173 103279. Bibcode:2022JHumE.17303279H. doi:10.1016/j.jhevol.2022.103279. ISSN 0047-2484. PMC 9703123. PMID 36375244.
- Harvati, Katerina; Röding, Carolin; Bosman, Abel M.; Karakostis, Fotios A.; Grün, Rainer; Stringer, Chris; Karkanas, Panagiotis; Thompson, Nicholas C.; Koutoulidis, Vassilis; Moulopoulos, Lia A.; Gorgoulis, Vassilis G.; Kouloukoussa, Mirsini (2019). "Apidima Cave fossils provide earliest evidence of Homo sapiens in Eurasia". Nature. 571 (7766). Springer Science and Business Media LLC: 500–504. doi:10.1038/s41586-019-1376-z. hdl:10072/397334. ISSN 0028-0836. PMID 31292546. S2CID 195873640.
- Beier, Judith; Anthes, Nils; Wahl, Joachim; Harvati, Katerina (2018). "Similar cranial trauma prevalence among Neanderthals and Upper Palaeolithic modern humans". Nature. 563 (7733). Springer Science and Business Media LLC: 686–690. Bibcode:2018Natur.563..686B. doi:10.1038/s41586-018-0696-8. ISSN 0028-0836. PMID 30429606. S2CID 53306963.
- Karakostis, Fotios Alexandros; Hotz, Gerhard; Tourloukis, Vangelis; Harvati, Katerina (5 September 2018). "Evidence for precision grasping in Neandertal daily activities". Science Advances. 4 (9) eaat2369. American Association for the Advancement of Science (AAAS). Bibcode:2018SciA....4.2369K. doi:10.1126/sciadv.aat2369. ISSN 2375-2548. PMC 6157967. PMID 30263956.
- Tourloukis, Vangelis; Harvati, Katerina (2018). "The Palaeolithic record of Greece: A synthesis of the evidence and a research agenda for the future". Quaternary International. 466. Elsevier BV: 48–65. Bibcode:2018QuInt.466...48T. doi:10.1016/j.quaint.2017.04.020. ISSN 1040-6182.
- Benazzi, Stefano; Douka, Katerina; Fornai, Cinzia; Bauer, Catherine C.; Kullmer, Ottmar; Svoboda, Jiří; Pap, Ildikó; Mallegni, Francesco; Bayle, Priscilla; Coquerelle, Michael; Condemi, Silvana; Ronchitelli, Annamaria; Harvati, Katerina; Weber, Gerhard W. (2011). "Early dispersal of modern humans in Europe and implications for Neanderthal behaviour". Nature. 479 (7374). Springer Science and Business Media LLC: 525–528. Bibcode:2011Natur.479..525B. doi:10.1038/nature10617. ISSN 0028-0836. PMID 22048311. S2CID 205226924.
- Hublin, Jean-Jacques; Ben-Ncer, Abdelouahed; Bailey, Shara E.; Freidline, Sarah E.; Neubauer, Simon; Skinner, Matthew M.; Bergmann, Inga; Le Cabec, Adeline; Benazzi, Stefano; Harvati, Katerina; Gunz, Philipp (8 June 2017). "New fossils from Jebel Irhoud, Morocco and the pan-African origin of Homo sapiens" (PDF). Nature. 546 (7657). Springer Science and Business Media LLC: 289–292. Bibcode:2017Natur.546..289H. doi:10.1038/nature22336. ISSN 0028-0836. PMID 28593953. S2CID 256771372.
- Reyes-Centeno, Hugo; Harvati, Katerina; Jäger, Gerhard (11 November 2016). "Tracking modern human population history from linguistic and cranial phenotype". Scientific Reports. 6 (1) 36645. Springer Science and Business Media LLC. Bibcode:2016NatSR...636645R. doi:10.1038/srep36645. ISSN 2045-2322. PMC 5105118. PMID 27833101.
- Harvati, Katerina (2016). Paleoanthropology of the Balkans and Anatolia: human evolution and its context. Dordrecht, The Netherlands: Springer. ISBN 978-94-024-0874-4. OCLC 969738482.
- Harvati, Katerina (24 December 2014). "Neanderthals and Their Contemporaries". Handbook of Paleoanthropology. Berlin, Heidelberg: Springer Berlin Heidelberg. pp. 2243–2279. doi:10.1007/978-3-642-39979-4_56. ISBN 978-3-642-39978-7.
- Reyes-Centeno, H.; Ghirotto, S.; Detroit, F.; Grimaud-Herve, D.; Barbujani, G.; Harvati, K. (21 April 2014). "Genomic and cranial phenotype data support multiple modern human dispersals from Africa and a southern route into Asia". Proceedings of the National Academy of Sciences. 111 (20): 7248–7253. Bibcode:2014PNAS..111.7248R. doi:10.1073/pnas.1323666111. ISSN 0027-8424. PMC 4034217. PMID 24753576.
- Grine, F. E.; Bailey, R. M.; Harvati, K.; Nathan, R. P.; Morris, A. G.; Henderson, G. M.; Ribot, I.; Pike, A. W. G. (2007-01-12). "Late Pleistocene Human Skull from Hofmeyr, South Africa, and Modern Human Origins". Science. 315 (5809): 226–229. Bibcode:2007Sci...315..226G. doi:10.1126/science.1136294. ISSN 0036-8075. PMID 17218524. S2CID 8229582.
- Harvati, Katerina (2006). Neanderthals revisited: new approaches and perspectives. Dordrecht, the Netherlands: Springer. ISBN 978-1-4020-5120-3. OCLC 209943947.
- Harvati, K.; Frost, S. R.; McNulty, K. P. (26 January 2004). "Neanderthal taxonomy reconsidered: Implications of 3D primate models of intra- and interspecific differences". Proceedings of the National Academy of Sciences. 101 (5): 1147–1152. Bibcode:2004PNAS..101.1147H. doi:10.1073/pnas.0308085100. ISSN 0027-8424. PMC 337021. PMID 14745010.
