= Jean-Jacques Hublin =

French paleoanthropologist

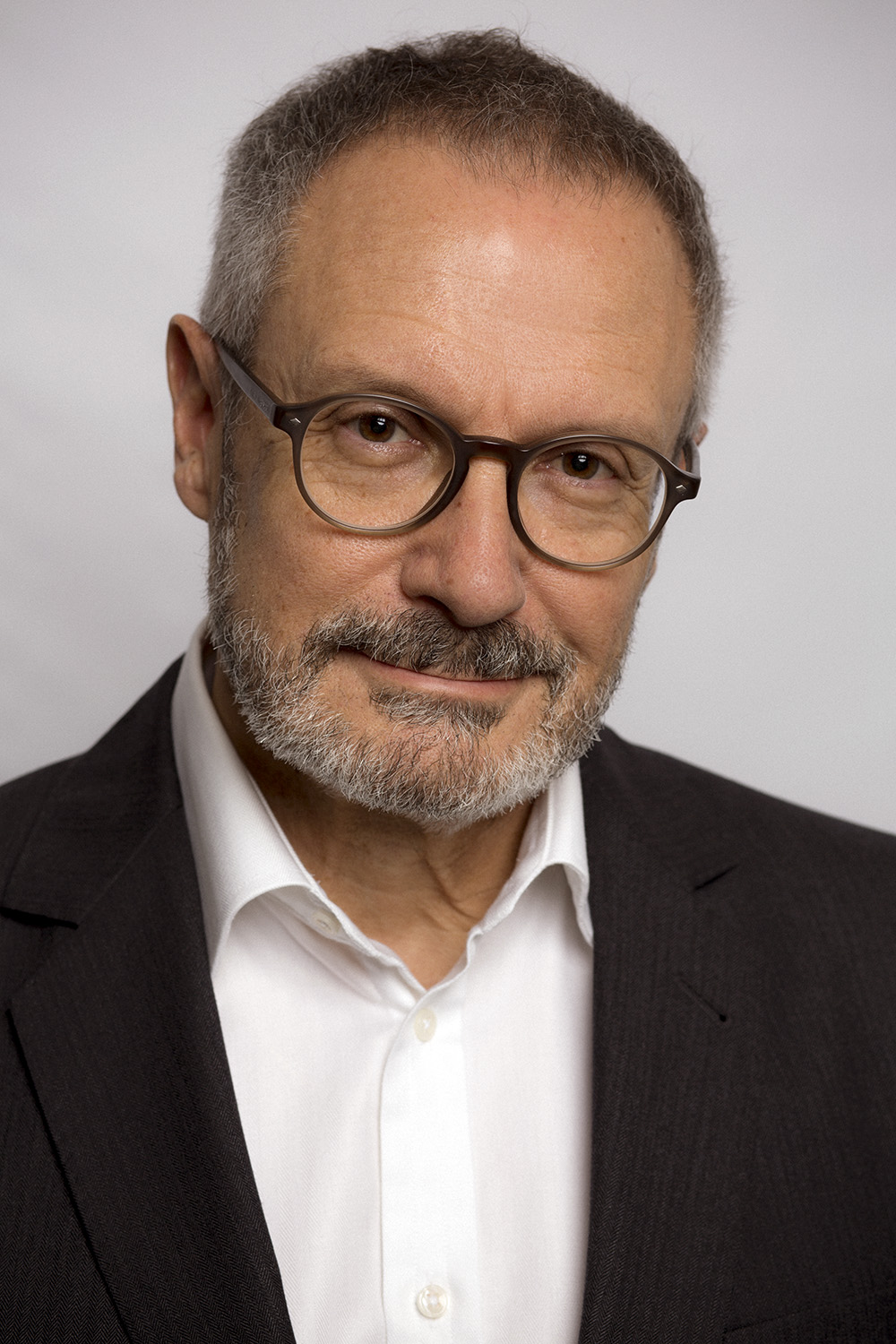
- Jean-Jacques Hublin in 2014
- Born: 30 November 1953 (age 72); Mostaganem, French Algeria
- Scientific career
- Fields: Paleoanthropology

Jean-Jacques Hublin (born 30 November 1953) is an Algerian-born French paleoanthropologist known for his work on the archaeology of ancient humans in the Pleistocene, in particular of Neanderthals and early anatomically modern humans, and has led excavations producing the oldest yet-known Homo sapiens fossils at the archaeological site of Jebel Irhoud, Morocco.

He is the founding Director Emeritus of the Department of Human Origins at the Max Planck Institute for Evolutionary Anthropology in Leipzig, Germany, Professor Emeritus of Paleoanthropology at the Leiden University, and currently Professor and Chair of Paleoanthropology at the Collège de France, in Paris, France. In 2010, Hublin founded the European Society for the Study of Human Evolution, serving as its president from 2010 to 2020.

== Personal life and education ==
Hublin was born in French Algeria and lived there with his family until 1961, when the family fled to Paris during the last year of the Algerian War of Independence. He spent his teenage years living in the subsidized housing of the northern Parisian suburbs. He later trained as a geologist and paleontologist at the Pierre and Marie Curie University of Paris, where he received his doctorate in 1978 under the supervision of Prof. B. Vandermeersch. He received his state doctorate (habilitation) in anthropology in 1991 at the University of Bordeaux.

== Career ==
After being hired as a researcher with the French National Center for Scientific Research (CNRS) in 1981 and working in different departments at the University of Paris, the National Natural History Museum in Paris, and the CNRS, Hublin became director of research at the CNRS. He was a visiting professor at the University of California - Berkeley in 1992, a visiting scholar at Harvard University in 1997, and a visiting professor at Stanford University in 1999 and 2011. In 2000, he was hired as a professor of anthropology at the University of Bordeaux I. In 2004, he became professor at the Max Planck Society (Germany) and moved to Leipzig to found the Department of Human Evolution at the newly created Max Planck Institute for Evolutionary Anthropology. In 2005, he was made honorary professor at the University of Leipzig. Hublin has had several administrative positions at various points in his career, and in particular, was Deputy Director in charge of the Prehistoric Archaeology, Biological Anthropology, and Paleoenvironmental Sciences sector of the French CNRS in 2002-2003. Currently, Hublin is one of the Directors of the MPI-EVA in Leipzig. In 2010, Hublin founded the European Society for the study of Human Evolution (ESHE). Hublin was appointed invited professor and international chair of paleoanthropology at the Collège de France in Paris in 2014, and holds an annual lecture series aimed at making paleoanthropology accessible to a general audience. In 2021, he retired from the Max Planck Society with emeritus status and was appointed to a permanent chair at the Collège de France in Paris.

In 2023 he was awarded the Balzan Prize and was elected at the French Academy of Sciences.

== Scientific work ==
Hublin has dedicated most of his career to the study of Middle and Late Pleistocene hominins, and in particular, to the biological and cultural evolution of Neandertals and to the origin of modern humans. He has also conducted fieldwork in various sites in Europe and North Africa. He also is the president of the European Society for the study of Human Evolution.

=== The origin of the Neandertals ===
Hublin's research initially focused on the origin of Neandertals, and in early 1980s, he used cladistic methods to demonstrate that this extinct lineage of humans was rooted much earlier than was thought at the time. He demonstrated that none of the European fossil material predating 40,000 years ago could be related to modern human ancestry. His views on Neandertal evolution were later fully confirmed by various discoveries, in particular, by the spectacular discovery of the fossil series from Sima de los Huesos (Atapuerca, Spain). He is best known for having proposed the 'accretion model' for the emergence of the Neandertals, a model that emphasizes the role of the environment, demographic fluctuations, and genetic drift in recent human evolution. This model has found much support in subsequent paleogenetical works.

=== North Africa and the origin of Homo sapiens ===
Another major focus of his research is on the origin of modern humans in Africa, specifically North Africa, where he has been conducting fieldwork for several years. In particular, at the site of Jebel Irhoud (Morocco), he has discovered important new fossil hominins, which document the emergence of our species more than 300,000 years ago and reveal that early Homo sapiens were not only represented in sub-Saharan Africa. In 2026, a group of scientists led by Hublin described 780,000 years old hominis from Thomas Quarry (Casablanca, Morocco) basal to the Homo sapiens lineage.

=== The fate of Neandertals ===
Hublin's demonstration that modern behaviors were present at the time of the very last Neandertals was a major contribution to the field. His work on Late Neandertal sites, such as those of La Roche à Pierrot (Saint-Césaire) and Arcy-sur-Cure (France), provided evidence for the late survival of Neandertals in Europe after the arrival of modern humans and the beginning of a genuinely "Upper Paleolithic" culture on the continent. He was one of the first to promote the "acculturation hypothesis", which seeks to explain the cultural evolution of the latest western Neandertals through the distant influence of the first modern populations already present in central Europe.

=== Denisovans in China ===
In addition to his work on Neandertals and early Homo sapiens, Hublin contributed to the identification of Denisovans outside Siberia. He signed as senior author a landmark study on a mandible discovered in the Baishiya Karst Cave on the Tibetan Plateau, which provided the first direct evidence of Denisovan presence in East Asia. Using a novel palaeoproteomic approach based on ancient collagen sequences, the research team was able to assign the fossil to the Denisovan lineage, despite the absence of recoverable DNA. This discovery significantly expanded the known geographic range of Denisovans and demonstrated their adaptation to high-altitude environments.

=== Early presence of Homo sapiens in Europe ===
Hublin played a key role in reshaping our understanding of the initial dispersal of Homo sapiens into Europe. He authored studies on the Bacho Kiro Cave (Bulgaria) and the Ilsenhöhle at Ranis (Germany), which yielded some the earliest known fossil evidence of directly dated modern humans on the continent. These findings pushed back the earliest known occupation of Europe by Homo sapiens by several millennia and challenged long-standing views that their arrival postdated 40,000 years ago.

=== Virtual paleoanthropology ===
In 1992, Hublin published the first application of virtual manipulation for the reconstruction of a human fossil from multiple pieces. Since then, he has further developed these techniques which provide new insights into the understanding of the anatomical evolution, cognitive development, and life history of our ancestors and their extinct relatives. His group provided new evidence on diverse issues such as the timing of brain development in early representatives of the genus Homo, the birth process of Neandertals, and the dental development of early Homo sapiens and Neandertals.

== Honours ==
- 2017: Commander of the Order of Intellectual Merit (Morocco)
- 2019: Knight of the Legion of Honour (France)
- 2021: International prize of the Fyssen Foundation (jointly with Svante Pääbo)
- 2023: Balzan Prize

== Controversy ==
In 2019, a largely-anonymous group of early-career researchers pledged to boycott the annual meeting of the European Society for the study of Human Evolution, a group led by Hublin, in the wake of allegations of sexual and professional misconduct. In response, Hublin denied the allegations, calling them "a toxic mix of half-truths, professional rivalry, and conspiracy theory propagated by people who have no clue". He was cleared by an internal investigation conducted by the Max Planck Society and retained his position as president of the European Society for the Study of Human Evolution. In 2020, his main accuser was sentenced by a German criminal court.

== Selected publications ==
=== Books ===
- Hublin, Jean-Jacques (2025). Biologie de la culture : Paléoanthropologie du genre Homo. Leçons inaugurales du Collège de France. Vol. 266. Éditions du Collège de France. p. 72.
- Hublin, Jean-Jacques (2024). Homo sapiens, une espèce invasive. Leçons inaugurales du Collège de France. Vol. 307. Éditions du Collège de France. p. 72.
- Hublin, Jean-Jacques (2024). La tyrannie du cerveau : Une nouvelle histoire de l'évolution humaine. Robert Laffont. p. 320.
- Cohen, C.; Hublin, J.-J. (1989). Boucher de Perthes, les origines romantiques de la Préhistoire (in French). Paris: Belin. ISBN 978-2-410-00935-4.
- Bailey, S.; Hublin, J.-J., eds. (2007). Dental Perspectives on Human Evolution; State of the Art Research in Dental Paleoanthropology. Dordrecht: Springer. ISBN 978-1-4020-5844-8.
- Hublin, Jean-Jacques; Seytre, Bernard (2008). Quand D'Autres Hommes Peuplaient La Terre: Nouveaux Regards Sur Nos Origines [When other humans populated the earth: new views of our origins]. Nouvelle Bibliothéque Scientifique (in French). Paris: Flammarion. ISBN 978-2-08-125242-4.
- Hublin, J.-J.; Richards, M.P., eds. (2009). The Evolution of Hominin Diets: Integrating Approaches to the Study of Palaeolithic Subsistence. Dordrecht: Springer. ISBN 978-90-481-8186-5.

=== Articles and Chapters in Edited Volumes ===
- Hublin, Jean-Jacques (1982). "Les anténéandertaliens: Presapiens ou prénéandertaliens". Geobios (in French). 15: 345–357. Bibcode:1982Geobi..15..345H. doi:10.1016/S0016-6995(82)80124-1. ISSN 0016-6995.
- Hublin, Jean-jacques; et al. (1992). "Recent human evolution in northwestern Africa". Philosophical Transactions of the Royal Society of London. Series B: Biological Sciences. 337 (1280): 185–191. Bibcode:1992RSPTB.337..185H. doi:10.1098/rstb.1992.0096. PMID 1357693.
- Hublin, Jean-Jacques; et al. (1996). "A late Neanderthal associated with Upper Palaeolithic artefacts". Nature. 381 (6579): 224–226. Bibcode:1996Natur.381..224H. doi:10.1038/381224a0. ISSN 1476-4687. PMID 8622762. S2CID 4370339.
- Hublin, J.-J. (1998). "Climatic Changes, Paleogeography, and the Evolution of the Neandertals". In Akazawa, Takeru; Aoki, Kenichi; Bar-Yosef, Ofer (eds.). Neandertals and Modern Humans in Western Asia. Springer US. pp. 295–310. doi:10.1007/0-306-47153-1_18. ISBN 978-0-306-47153-7.
- Hublin, J. J. (2009). "The origin of Neandertals". Proceedings of the National Academy of Sciences. 106 (38): 16022–16027. Bibcode:2009PNAS..10616022H. doi:10.1073/pnas.0904119106. ISSN 0027-8424. PMC 2752594. PMID 19805257.
- Hublin, Jean-Jacques; et al. (2015). "Brain ontogeny and life history in Pleistocene hominins". Philosophical Transactions of the Royal Society B: Biological Sciences. 370 (1663) 20140062. doi:10.1098/rstb.2014.0062. PMC 4305163. PMID 25602066.
- Hublin, Jean-Jacques; et al. (2017). "New fossils from Jebel Irhoud, Morocco and the pan-African origin of Homo sapiens". Nature. 546 (7657): 289–292. Bibcode:2017Natur.546..289H. doi:10.1038/nature22336. hdl:11585/610328. ISSN 1476-4687. PMID 28593953. S2CID 256771372.
- Hublin, Jean-Jacques; Sirakov, Nikolay; Aldeias, Vera; Bailey, Shara E.; Bard, Edouard; Delvigne, Vincent; et al. (2020). "Initial Upper Palaeolithic Homo sapiens from Bacho Kiro Cave, Bulgaria". Nature. 581 (7808): 299–302. Bibcode:2020Natur.581..299H. doi:10.1038/s41586-020-2259-z. hdl:11585/770553. PMID 32433609.
- Hublin, Jean-Jacques; Lefèvre, David; Perini, Simone; et al. (2026). "Early hominins from Morocco basal to the Homo sapiens lineage". Nature. 649 (8098): 902–908. Bibcode:2026Natur.649..902H. doi:10.1038/s41586-025-09914-y. PMC 12823423. PMID 41501464.

== Video ==
- Video on Jean-Jacques Hublin's research (Latest Thinking)
