= Lanzhou University =

Public university in Lanzhou, Gansu, China

Coordinates: 36°2′47.8″N 103°51′29.0″E

- 兰州大学
- Motto: 自强不息 独树一帜
- Motto in English: Constantly Improving, Blazing Our Own Path
- Type: Public
- Established: 1909; 117 years ago
- President: Yang Yongping
- Faculty: 2,135
- Administrative staff: 836
- Undergraduates: 19,775
- Postgraduates: 10,572
- Doctoral students: 2,559
- Location: 222 South Tianshui Road, Lanzhou, Lanzhou, Gansu, China
- Colors: Blue Black
- Nickname: 兰大 LanDa
- Website: www.lzu.edu.cn

Chinese name
- Simplified Chinese: 兰州大学
- Traditional Chinese: 蘭州大學
Transcriptions
Standard Mandarin
- Hanyu Pinyin: Lánzhōu Dàxué

Lanzhou University (兰州大学) is a public university in Lanzhou, Gansu, China. It is affiliated with the Ministry of Education of China. The university is part of Project 211, Project 985, and the Double First-Class Construction.

Founded in 1909, the university provides programs for undergraduate, graduate students on four campuses—three in Lanzhou city centre and one in Yuzhong County, about 30 miles away from the main campus. It is one of the first universities in China to set up a national basic science research and teaching talent training base for arts and sciences, one of the first universities selected for the National College Student Innovative Experiment Program, and one of the 19 universities in China to implement a pilot program for training top students in basic disciplines. As of now, there are 20,686 undergraduate students, 15,081 master's degree students and 5,326 doctoral students. There are 99 undergraduate majors and 16 national characteristic majors. There are 10 national teaching teams, 6 national talent training bases and 52 national first-class undergraduate major construction sites.

== History ==
Lanzhou University's history traces back to 1909 when its predecessor, the Gansu School of Law and Politics, was founded. The School of Law and Politics became the Sun Yat-sen University of Lanzhou in 1928 and from 1945, the National Lanzhou University. After 1949, it went by the name Lanzhou University. It was designated one of China's 14 key universities.

In 1932 the Lanzhou Medical College and its affiliated hospital were founded.

In 2002 the Gansu Grassland Ecology Research Institute, and in 2004 the Lanzhou Medical College were incorporated into Lanzhou University.

Lanzhou University is noted for being one of China's premier institutions of higher learning with its position as the best university in Northwestern China.

Lanzhou University was one of the first universities entitled to enroll Bachelor Master's and Doctoral degree candidates in 1981.

In 2017, Lanzhou University was designated as a class A university in the Double First-Class Construction.

Lanzhou University maintains one of China's top ten Ph.D. programs in physics, chemistry, atmospheric sciences and geography and highly ranked programs in information science, biology, botany, mathematics, history, media, ecology and Chinese literature. It is especially noted in fundamental science, ranked in the top 1% of the Essential Science Indicators index.

The landing system of China's Chang'e 4 lunar lander was thanks to a Lanzhou University developed gamma shutdown sensor.

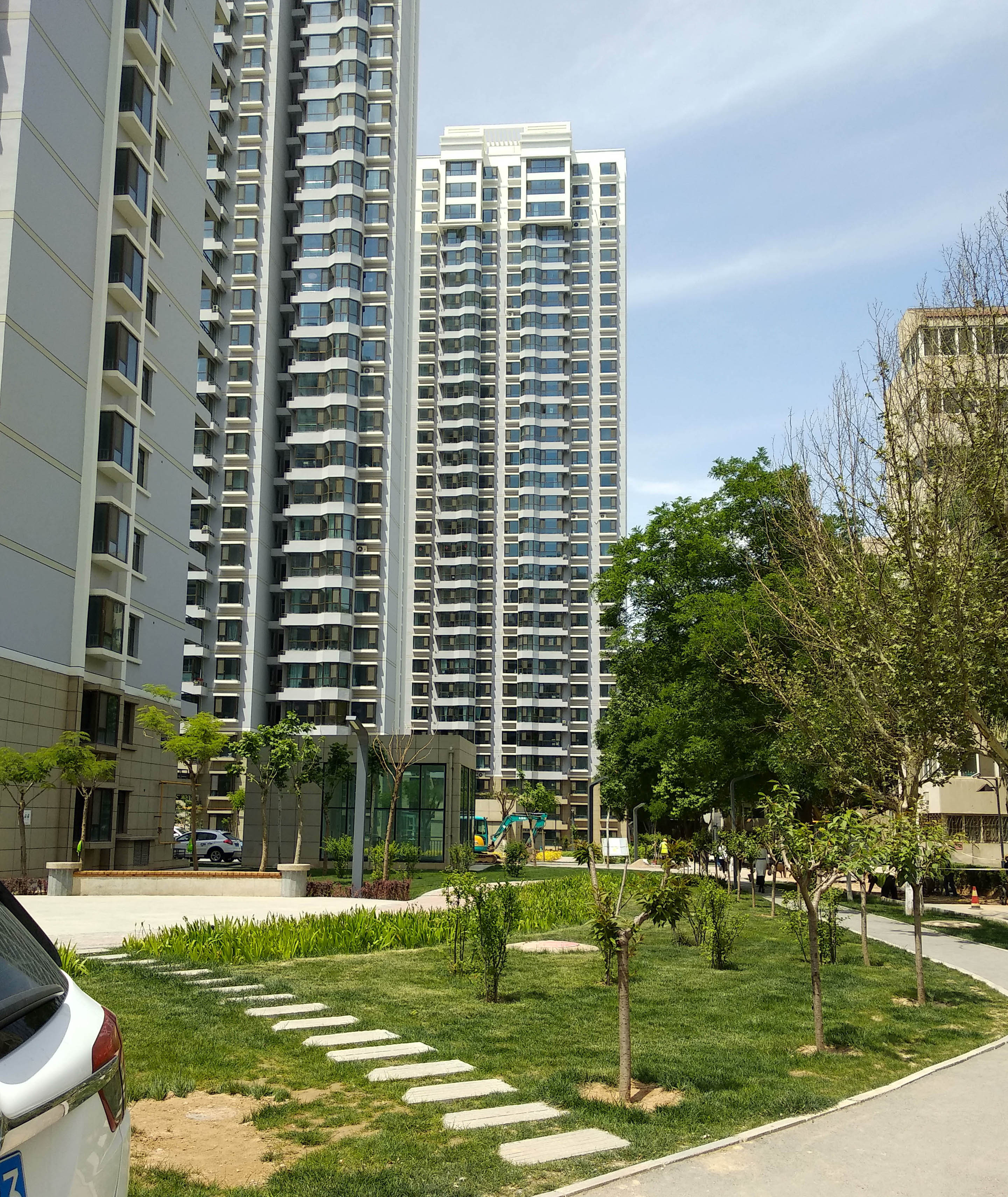
Lanzhou University Staff Housing Campus

== Primary laboratories ==
Lanzhou University has three primary laboratories and analytical testing facility sanctioned by the Chinese Ministry of Education and deemed as high importance to the state.

=== Laboratory of Arid Agroecology ===
The laboratory was founded in 1991 under ratification of the Planning Commission of China and engaged in arid agriculture ecology research. The Laboratory of Arid Agroecology is the only lab engaged in arid agriculture ecology research under the Chinese Ministry of Education. The lab has been highly developed on the basis of the authorization to confer bachelor, masters, doctorate and post-doctoral degrees through the financial aid of the World Bank loan.

=== Laboratory of Applied Organic Chemistry ===
The Laboratory of Applied Organic Chemistry was one of the first state key laboratories ratified by Planning Commission of China. It was founded in December 1987, open to visiting scholars and scientists from both within China and abroad. It is one primary laboratories to cultivate talents for organic chemistry. The researches of the laboratory focus on organic molecular chemistry of special function, especially in the field of basic research on active organic molecules.

=== Open Laboratory of Applied Magnetism ===
Created in 1993 by the Chinese Ministry of Education, this is an open laboratory conducting research in the field of Applied Magnetism. The lab is chiefly engaged in studies on applications of perpendicular magnetic recording. The laboratory also conducts research and development on new applied magnetic materials which can be used for commercial applications. Mossbauer spectrometry, nuclear magnetic resource spin echo spectroscopy and general magnetic testing media are used to study magnetic materials' microscopic structure and general magnetic behavior. The laboratory is equipped with major facilities including a vibrating sample magnetometer, high pressure mossbauer spectroscope and magnetron sputtering system, along with many others. The lab also serves as a key resource for research in materials science and condensed matter physics.

The laboratory has 24 professional researchers and technicians, among who are 4 doctoral advisers.

=== Analytical Testing Center ===
Financed by the first loan issued by the World Bank to develop universities, construction on this center began in 1982. It contains more than 20 major instruments and devices including a High-Resolution Mass Spectrometer, Infrared Spectrometer, X-Ray Quadrupole Diffractometer, Laser Raman Spectrometer, FT-IR Spectrometer, and others. The center is primarily engaged in the determination and analysis of the structure of matter. It also conducts graduate students' experiments which leads to the conferring of Master's and Ph.D. degrees. A testing service is available to the public.

Established by the State Technology Superintendency in 1992, it is the approved lab for the inspection of imported and exported chemical and mining products.

== Campus ==
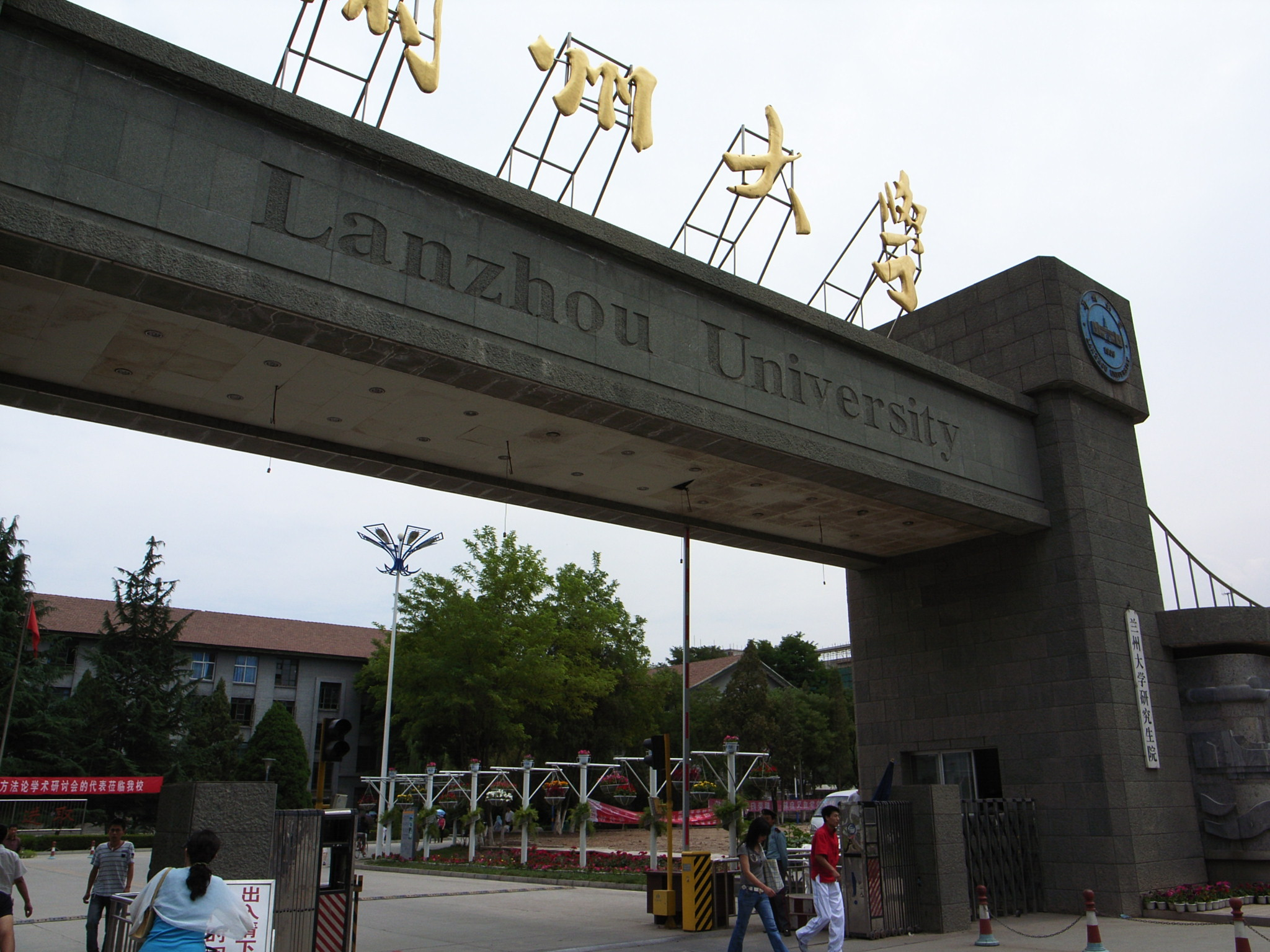
Lanzhou University

Lanzhou University has two campuses. The oldest campus is located in the center of Lanzhou (Chengguan District), whereas the main campus is located in Yuzhong County. The One Belt and One Road campus, north of Lanzhou is under construction.

There are 6 National Bases for the Training of Researching and Teaching personnel for Fundamental Disciplines. The University operates an additional 35 institutes along with 1 national key Laboratory of the Applied Organic and 3 key laboratories of Arid and Grassland Ecology, West China Environment, Magnetism and Magnetic Materials of the Ministry of Education, a key laboratory of Grassland Agro-ecosystem of the Ministry of Agriculture.

== Rankings and reputation ==
University rankings
BCUR National	Domestic	39
Wu Shulian National	Domestic	44
CUAA National	Alumni	34
QS National	General	62
QS Asia (Asia version)	General	214
ARWU World	Research	201–300
QS World	General	791-800
USNWR World	General	460

Lanzhou University was one of the Project 985 universities in China to appear in the world’s top 500 universities in the global university ranking in 2007, according to the Academic Ranking of World Universities. Lanzhou University is one of the top universities in China in terms of contributions to academic publications in international journals frequently cited by ongoing research from around the world, ranking the 26th among all Chinese Universities in number of citations per paper from 2008 to 2017.

In 2023, the Academic Ranking of World Universities (ARWU) ranked Lanzhou University at 201-300th globally. From the same rankings by subjects, "Chemistry" and "Atmospheric Science" subjects were ranked in the global top 100.

The U.S. News & World Report Best Global University Ranking 2025-2026 ranked Lanzhou as #460 in the world, #116 in Asia and #62 in China.

In 2020, the QS World University Ranking ranked the university within the 751-800th band globally.

== Schools and Colleges of Lanzhou University ==
- School of Earth Sciences
- School of Network Education
- Sports Teaching and Research Department
- School of Arts
- School of Management
- Second Clinical School
- First Clinical School
- School of Pharmacy
- School of Basic Medical Sciences
- School of Pastoral Agriculture Science and Technology
- School of Earth and Environmental Sciences
- School of Atmospheric Sciences
- School of Life Sciences
- College of Ecology
- School of Nuclear Science and Technology
- School of Physical Science and Technology
- School of Philosophy and Sociology
- School of Foreign Languages and Literature
- School of International Cultural Exchange
- School of Law
- School of Economics
- School of Marxism
- School of History and Culture
- School of Journalism and Communication
- Ethnology Institute
- School of Chinese Language and Literature
- School of Mathematics and Statistics
- School of Chemistry and Chemical Engineering
- Research School of Arid Environment and Climate Change
- School of Information Science and Engineering
- School of Civil Engineering and Mechanics
- School of Public Health
- School of Dental Medicine
- School of Continuing Education
- Cuiying Honors College

== Notable faculty and alumni ==
- Hu Qing - Professor of Electrical Engineering, MIT, Graduated from LZU Physics
- Shui Junyi - top 10 Distinguished young people, Celebrated TV program host, Graduated from LZU foreign language
- Li Yang - founder of Crazy English, Graduated from LZU mechanics
- Lu Hao - Governor of Gansu Province, Graduated from LZU Chemistry
- Yang Liming - Vice Secretary of Inner Mongolia, Graduated from LZU Philosophy
- Zhang Xuezhong - Vice Secretary of Sichuan Province, Graduated from LZU Chinese Language
- Cang Hui - Theoretical ecologist, Stellenbosch University, SARChI Chair in Mathematical and Theoretical Physical Biosciences
- Huang Bo - CEO at CHINAEDU CORP, a NASDAQ listed company, Class of 1985, Biology, LZU
- Wu Yundong, theoretical organic chemist
- Shu Hongbing, biologist, academician of Chinese Academy of Sciences, B.S. of LZU
- Ren Jianxin, entrepreneur, founding president of ChemChina, M.S. of LZU
- Zhang Dongju, PhD 2010, faculty
- Zhang Chunyuan, student, rightist, founder of the Lanzhou University Rightist Counter-Revolutionary Clique

== See also ==
- Lanzhou University Health Science Center
