= Xuchang Man =

Fossils of extinct hominin

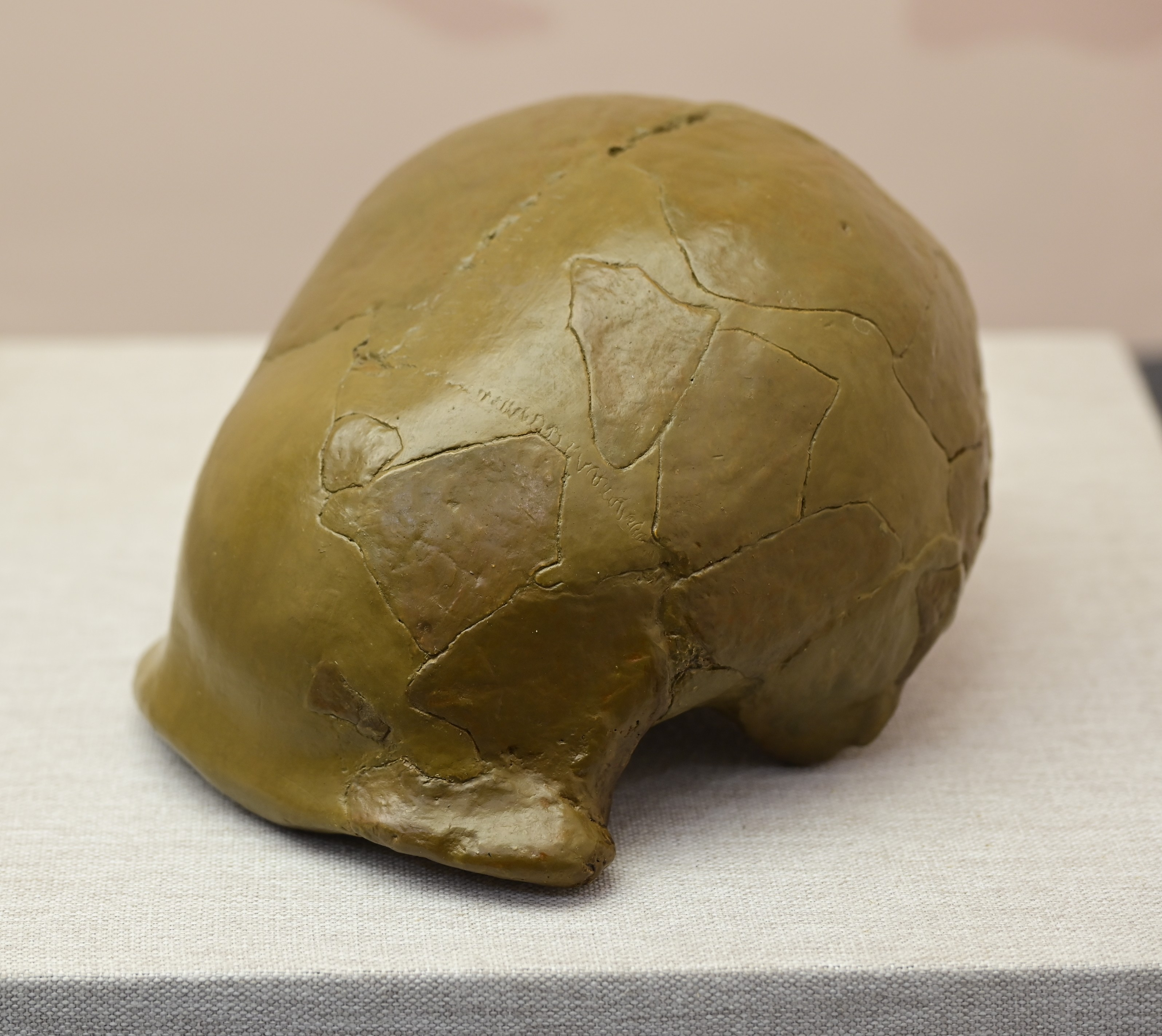
- Common name: Xuchang Man
- Species: Homo sp.
- Age: Late Pleistocene, 125,000–105,000 years ago
- Place discovered: Lingjing site, Xuchang, Henan Province, China
- Date discovered: 2007
- Discovered by: Li Zhanyang

The Xuchang Man is a set of skulls belonging to an extinct hominin species of the genus Homo that lived in Central China around 105,000 to 125,000 years ago during the Late Pleistocene. The two known skull material are collected by Zhanyang Li in 2007 and 2014 from Xuchang, Henan Province, and formally described by Li and colleagues in 2017. The skulls are initially reported to have similarities to the early modern human (Homo sapiens), Peking Man (Homo erectus) and Neanderthal (Homo neanderthalensis). Phylogenetic analysis in 2025 suggested that the Xuchang Man is likely distinct from other early or archaic humans.

== Discovery ==
The Xuchang Man fossils were discovered from Lingjing site located in northeast Xuchang county, Henan Province, Central China. The Lingjing site was discovered in 1965 as an archaeological site containing many prehistoric human tools. Excavation was difficult due to continuous seeping underground water. In 2005, the water source, a spring, completely dried up so that Li Zhanyang (also spelled Zhan-Yang) from the Henan Provincial Institute of Cultural Heritage and Archaeology, and also at the Institute of Vertebrate Paleontology and Paleoanthropology, Chinese Academy of Sciences, was able to conduct systematic excavation and soon discovered numerous animal fossils, stone and bone tools from different ages. In a more comprehensive excavation that lasted till 2015, Li, then accompanied by Li Yanan (from Henan Institute of Cultural Relics and Archaeology) and Shinji Kato (from Nara National Research Institute for Cultural Properties, Japan), discovered more stone tools by which the site was recognised as prehistoric human habitation, specifically calling it a "stone industrial site". Fragments of humans fossils representing at least five individuals, nicknamed the Xuchang Man, were also collected at the deepest layer, and were associated with many stone tools and animal bones.

In December 2007, Li first noticed beautiful quartz stone tools at the newly dug up area in Lingjing site. Searching for more tools for the next two days, he found a distinct skull cap consisting of small fragments, designated Xuchang 1, that were dispersed all over a small areas. He could not make a detailed description due to absence of other similar fossils and its fragmentary nature. In 2014, another skull cap, Xuchang 2 was found that made its possible to make proper analysis. The fossils were first reported in the Journal of Xuchang University in 2008. By 2014, 44 human skulls were found but were more fragmented and likely not related to Xuchang Man that they were excluded from further analysis.

Full analysis including morphometric analysis, CT scanning, 3D graphic reconstruction and interpretation were performed with the help of Erik Trinkaus of the Washington University, US. Li's team also performed age determination (carbon-14 and optically stimulated luminescence) testings. The results were published in the journal Science in 2017.

== Description ==
The larger fossil, Xuchang 1, has a brain volume of 1,800 cubic centimetres, much larger than that of the average modern human (with 1,400 cubic centimetres). While the brain size of Xuchang 2 is within the average of modern humans. A low skull cover with relatively flat surface found in both fossils is a feature of Peking Man. However, Xuchang 1 also shows many features of those of modern humans. The thin bone plate and moderate brow ridge are similar to those of early modern humans. They also exhibit important features of Neanderthals, the appearance of semicircular canals inside the skull and the organisation of the rear of the skull. Zhou Liping of Peking University who led the research on dating the specimens reported that the fossils were buried around 105,000 to 125,000 (130,000) years ago.

== Classification ==
The fossils of the Xuchang Man have features found across different human species, which makes it difficult to confirm its exact identity in the absence of avilable DNA sequences. Genome sequencing had effectively established the modern humans, Denisovans and Neanderthals as closely related, unique species, yet they share large portions of their genomes with living humans. The discoverer of the Xuchang Man, Zhanyang Li, is convinced that the fossils represent a distinct, extinct species of hominin, while María Martinón-Torres of the University College London suggested that the two humans could be of the same species, just with "an Asian flavor" in Xuchang Man. One of the corresponding authors of the 2017 description of Xuchang Man, Erik Trinkaus, stated that the relationship between the Xuchang Man and Denisovans cannot be confirmed without DNA evidence. Trinkaus also suggested that human populations in eastern Eurasia may have evolved over time while staying connected to other populations across Eurasia, sharing similar changes and contributing to the development of modern humans.

In their 2024 description of the new extinct species of hominin based on the Xujiayao hominin, Homo juluensis, Xiujie Wu and Christopher J. Bae suggested that Xuchang Man may represent a paratype of this species. Bae and Wu further argued that fossils like Denisovans (specifically the Xiahe mandible) and Penghu 1 should also be included in H. juluensis. G. Philip Rightmire of the Binghamton University, New York, disagreed and suggested that these fossils in China can be grouped into Homo heidelbergensis. Structural comparison (morphometric analysis) in 2004 of the putative Denisovans and Narmada Human (discovered in India) by David Gokhman and his team at Weizmann Institute of Science, Israel, indicated that Xuchang Man could not be fitted into the Denisovan group. In 2025, Xiaobo Feng and colleagues performed phylogenetic analysis based on various hominin fossils from the Pleistocene of China, and suggested that the Xuchang Man is likely distinct from other early or archaic humans, such as Homo longi (Denisovans), Xujiayao hominin, Penghu 1, Hualongdong people, Dali Man and Jinniushan Man.
