= Jinniushan human =

Archaic human fossil

- Catalog no.: JNS 1
- Common name: Jinniushan human
- Species: Archaic Homo sapiens
- Age: 260±20 ka
- Place discovered: Jinniushan, Yingkou, Liaoning Province, China
- Date discovered: 1984
- Discovered by: Lü Zuné

Jinniushan human is a fossil of archaic human that lived around 260,000 years ago during the late Chibanian (Middle Pleistocene) in northeastern China. It was discovered in 1984 from a collapsed cave at Jinniushan near Yingkou in Liaoning Province, and consisted of fragments of the skull cap (cranium), rib, hand and leg bones, all belonging to a single individual of about 30 years of age.

Originally named "Jinniushan Man" because of its robust features, reanalysis in 2006 identified the individual as a woman. With an estimated height of 168 centimetres (5 ft 6 in), it is the largest known archaic female among human fossils. Although the brain case appeared similar to those of modern humans, the other skeletal features are more primitive, with several common structures to those of Homo erectus.

== Discovery ==
Jinniushan is a mountain (variously known in English as "Golden Ox Mountain", "Gold Bull Mountain" or "Gold Ox Mount") was first explored in the early 1940s as potential gold mine. It is a limestone region of only 69.3 m above the sea level at the highest point with a total area of 308 sq m. It is located near the Xintiantun village in Liaoning Province, northern China. It became a fossil site since the discoveries of mammalian fossils by the Yingkou Municipal Museum in 1974 and subsequently by the Jinniushan Joint Excavation Team in 1975 and 1976. An excavation in 1978 by the Yingkou Municipal Museum discovered stone tools by which the locality was identified as that of Lower Palaeolithic (around 3.3 Ma to 300 ka) human habitation. That year it was designated as a Protected Cultural Heritage Unit of Yingkou city, and then a Protected Cultural Heritage Unit of Liaoning Province in 1980.

In September 1984, Lü Zuné (呂遵諤) organised an excavation project with his students at the Department of Archaeology of the Peking University. From 27 September, the team started to collect pieces of human bones from a collapsed limestone cave at the foot of the mountain. On 2 October, they found a skull with almost all the upper part intact.

In 1985, Lü reported the findings in a Chinese journal Beijing da xue xue bao: Zhe xue she hui ke xue ban (Journal of Peking University: Philosophy and Social Sciences). He gave the identification as a male aged between 25 and 30 years and belonging to the species H. erectus. Based on the available geological evidence at the time, Lü estimated the age as about 280,000 years old (formally published in 1989). The fossil site and the human remains were examined by other palaeontologists, but no agreement on the identification. In 1987, taking the thick bones to be a general feature of men, Lü described the fossil as "Jinniushan Man", which became its formal name. Wu Rukang (also known as Woo Ting-Lian before 1967), an anthropologist at the Chinese Academy of Sciences, was the first to cast doubt on the analysis. He was tasked with reconstruction of the bones and gave the results in 1988, describing the closer resemblance to modern humans:

The skull belongs to a male individual over 30 years of age. lts cranial capacity is about 1390 ml. The thickness of the vault is 4.5 mm in average. Together with many other features, the total morphological pattern is much more closer to that of the early or archaic Homo sapiens such as the Dali skull than to that of the latest Homo erectus such as the Peking Man skull found in the upper part of the Zhoukoudian Lower cave. The tentative date of the Jinniushan skull of 280,000 years old as given by Lü is doubtful.

Wu's identification of the species as archaic H. sapiens is generally supported by other scientists and computerised analysis of the facial structure, although the classification with other related specimens can be controversial.

To resolve the conflicting interpretations, the Peking University collaborating with the Liaoning Provincial Institute of Archaeology and Cultural Relics conducted five excavations between 1986 and 1994. Several fragments of the body parts were collected that gave different ages. In 1988, Chen Tiemei and Yuan Sixun published their radiometric (uranium series dating) analysis indicating the age range between 300 and 230 ka. The average year of 260 ka became generally accepted as the correct age. In 1995, Lü reanalysed the hip bone and concluded that the specimen was of a female.

== Features ==
The human fossil elements at Jinniushan all belong to one female individual. The fossil remains consist of one cranium, six vertebrae (one cervical, five thoracic), one complete left os coxae, one complete left ulna, one complete left patella, two left ribs, and several hand and feet bones. Analysis of the left-half of the pelvis (hip bone) in 2006 confirmed that the individual was a woman.

=== Skull and brain ===
The skull of Jinniushan human measures 20.4 centimetres (8.0 in) in length and 14.9 centimetres (5.9 in) in width, the size of which falls within the average of those of H. erectus. The brain size (cranial capacity) is 1,330 cm^{3} (81 cu in), which is within the range of that of modern humans. H. erectus have smaller brain size, averaging at 950 cm^{3} (58 cu in); the largest recorded being from Asian specimen, H. e. soloensis, having 1,251 cm^{3} (76.3 cu in) brain size. The skull is thick-walled unlike modern humans, but not as thick as those of H. erectus. Like in modern humans, the brow ridges are reduced; while pronounced brow ridges are characteristics of H. erectus and older hominins. The encephalization quotient (EQ) is estimated to be around 4.150. Both are typical of the rapidly increasing brain capacity and EQ found in other specimens from the Middle Pleistocene.

=== Body size ===
The Jinniushan human's body mass is estimated to be around 78.6 kg (173 lb), making it the largest female specimen ever discovered in the fossil record. The other largest female specimen ever discovered, found at Grotte du Prince at the France-Italy border of early Late Pleistocene, from around 100,000 BP, has an estimated body mass of 74 kg (163 lb).

Body size in Homo reached its maximum during the Middle Pleistocene, so the size of the Jinniushan human is not surprising, especially since the specimen was found at a high latitude, cold climate location. In accordance with Allen's rule and Bergmann's rule, the large body, wide trunk, and short limbs of the Jinniushan human is to be expected, as the hominins from that time relied more on their physical body as a cold adaptation, as their technological culture was not yet as advanced as later hominins.

== Relationship with other human fossils ==
Recent human family tree

- - Neanderthals
  - - - Homo antecessor
      - - Jinniushan
        - - Hualong
          - - Dali
            - - Xiahe
              - Harbin
    - Modern humans

According to Ni et al. 2021 (note, Xiahe and Denisovans are most closely related to Neanderthals according to nDNA and ancient protein analyses by Chen et al. 2019.)

Jinniushan human belongs to an archaic human with mixed H. erectus and H. sapiens features. The fossil resembles that of the Dali Man, discovered in 1978 in Dali County, Shaanxi Province, that also showed a mixture of H. erectus and H. sapiens. Its skull is the same size as Dali Man's. Its main difference is that it is more gracile, which can be explained by sexual dimorphism. In addition, the cranial vault and supraorbitals are thinner, and the overall brain capacity larger than those of the Dali specimen. Both specimens have flat and broad faces, a feature shared with the specimen from Hulu Cave, Nanjing; both also share some features with the Zhoukoudian and Yunxian Man.

== Evolutionary importance ==
A distinguishing feature of the Jinniushan human is its large brain. According to Karen Rosenberg of the University of Delaware, the species marks the period in which H. sapiens acquired larger brain that differentiated them from other human species. The Jinniushan human's brain indicate adaptation to cold as the climate at the time would have been milder in northeast China. Traces of burnt animal bones and hearth found at the same site indicate the food habits and management in the cold environment.
