= Suprainiac fossa =

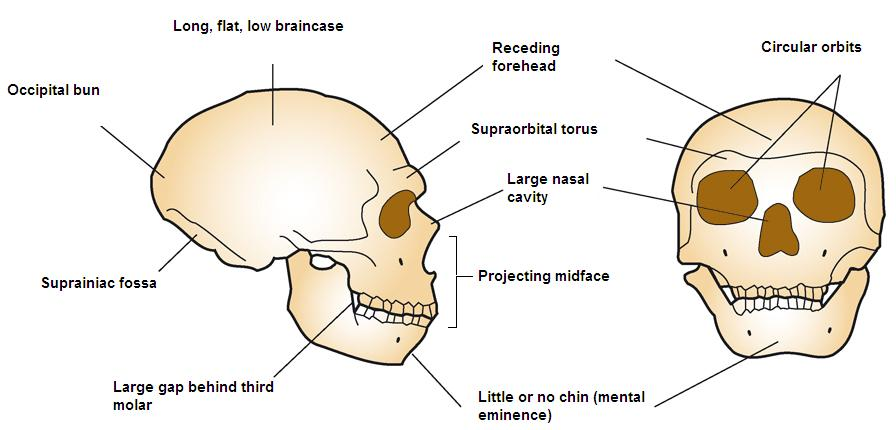
A representative profile (left) and frontal (right) view of Neanderthal skull anatomy. In the profile view, the suprainiac fossa is labeled beneath the occipital bun, with a rough surface often seen in Neanderthal fossil specimens.

A suprainiac fossa (pl. fossae) is a generally oval-shaped depression on the occipital bone, just above the bony point of the external occipital protuberance, referred to as the inion. It is absent in anatomically modern humans, but a characteristic element of cranial anatomy in certain archaic humans including nearly all Neanderthals and Denisovans, and thus likely also their common ancestor.

== Classification history ==
Suprainiac fossae were first described in an archaic human cranium by the German anatomist Hermann Klaatsch in 1902. However, the contemporary understanding of Neanderthals and other archaic hominins as part of a wider evolutionary tree comprising the genus Homo did not arrive until the latter half of the 20th century, brought on by a steadily broadening human fossil record. As these fossils were documented, consistent features of skeletal morphology emerged among them and contributed to their classifications, which have been further refined as the fossil record continues expanding. Suprainiac fossae specifically were first described formally as a derived feature of Neanderthals in 1978, by the Algerian-born French paleoanthropologist Jean-Jacques Hublin.

By the 2010s, extensive morpological and skeletal microanalysis had led to the consensus that the suprainiac fossae in Neanderthals was a derived trait, and not homologous with mild occipital depressions uncommonly seen in some prehistoric humans, particularly Central European hunter-gatherers.

== Characteristics and archaeological examples ==
Suprainiac fossae vary in specific presentation, with some Neanderthals having fossae so large they cover most of the occipital plane and result in a nearly flat posterior cranial surface. Others feature less prominent examples, including variation in most geometrical dimensions. They are generally accompanied by cratered or porous external surface of the occipital bone, and bordered by a roughly triangule-shaped raised bone surface with the base at the point of the occipital bun and the apex pointing parallel to the sagittal suture. In terms of skeletal microanatomy, Neanderthal suprainic fossae feature a pronounced thinning of the internal diploë, the porous bone layer sandwiched between the much denser cortical bone layers of the skull.

The external occipital protuberance in a modern human skull model. Occipital depressions seen in ancient (but still anatomically modern) humans generally occur around this point.

Virtually all Neanderthal specimens featuring occiptal bones exhibit suprainiac fossae of some degree. Additionally, in 2026, proteomic evidence largely settled the debate over several previously unclassified East Asian archaic hominin fossils (including crania) as Denisovan, and many of these such as Xuchang Man and Harbin cranium feature prominent suprainiac fossae. Archaic non- or pre-Neanderthal examples of crania featuring suprainiac fossa include Eyasi 1 (possibly late H. erectus) and the Sima de los Huesos hominins.

== Presence in anatomically modern humans ==
Various occipital depressions can be seen in ancient but anatomically modern humans, particularly examples from Central European archaeological sites including Bronze Age excavations at Pod, in Bosnia and Herzegovina, and Upper Paleolithic sites from Mladeč, Pavlov, Brno, and Předmostí. These have been suggested by some as morphology inherited from recent Neanderthal admixture. However, those depressions feature bone resorption on the external surface only, with the diploë unchanged, making this relationship unlikely. A similar claim existed for the "occipital hemibun" feature characteristic of Upper Paleolithic anatomically modern humans. Likewise, microanatomy as well as longitudinal clinical reseach of cranial development from early childhood to adulthood both strongly suggest against a homologous relationship between the Neanderthal occipital bun with this feature of Upper Paleolithc modern humans.
