= Denisovan =

Archaic human species from Asia

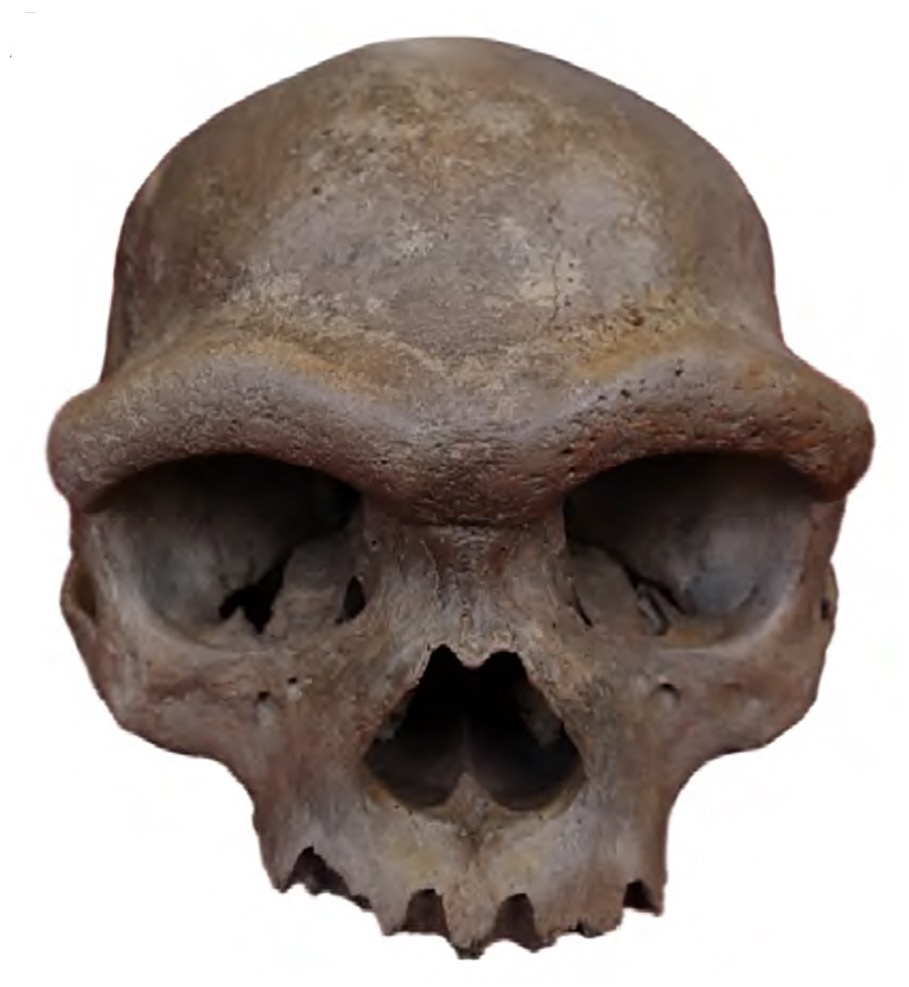
The Harbin cranium, the holotype of the species Homo longi, a Denisovan cranium

The Denisovans or Denisova hominins (/dəˈnɪsəvə(nz)/ də-NIS-ə-və(nz)) are an extinct species or subspecies of archaic human that ranged across Asia during the Middle to Late Pleistocene, approximately 200,000–32,000 years ago. Most of what is known about Denisovans comes from DNA evidence. While many recent fossils have been found and tentatively identified as Denisovan, the first Denisovans discovered were known from few physical remains. Consequently, no formal species name has been established. However, an analysis of the mitochondrial DNA and endogenous proteins from the Harbin cranium, which had been given the name Homo longi, showed that this skull represents a Denisovan. Analysis of protein sequences from the Xujiayao hominin fossils, which had been given the name Homo juluensis, indicated that these remains also likely represent Denisovans.

The first identification of a Denisovan individual occurred in 2010, based on mitochondrial DNA (mtDNA) extracted from a juvenile finger bone excavated from the Siberian Denisova Cave in the Altai Mountains in 2008. Nuclear DNA indicates close affinities with Neanderthals. The cave was also periodically inhabited by Neanderthals. Additional specimens from Denisova Cave were subsequently identified, as were specimens from the Baishiya Karst Cave on the Tibetan Plateau, Tam Ngu Hao 2 Cave in the Annamite Mountains of Laos, the Penghu channel between Taiwan and the mainland, Harbin in Manchuria, Xujiayao in Hebei, and Bianfu Cave in Yunnan.

DNA evidence suggests they had dark skin, eyes, and hair, and had a Neanderthal-like build. Based on the Harbin cranium, like other archaic humans, the skull is low and long, with massively developed brow ridges, wide eye sockets, and a large mouth. The two existing Denisovan mandibles show that, like Neanderthals, the Denisovans lacked a chin. Like modern humans and the much earlier Homo antecessor, but unlike Neanderthals, the face is rather flat, but with a larger nose. However, they had larger molars which are reminiscent of Middle to Late Pleistocene archaic humans and australopithecines. The cranial capacity and therefore the brain size of the Denisovans was within the range of modern humans and Neanderthals.

Denisovans interbred with modern humans, with a high percentage (roughly 5%) of Denisovan DNA occurring in Melanesians, Aboriginal Australians, and Filipino Negritos. In contrast, 0.2% derives from Denisovan ancestry in mainland Asians and Native Americans. In a 2018 study, South Asians were found to have levels of Denisovan admixture similar to that seen in East Asians. Another study found that the highest Denisovan ancestry is inferred in Oceanians (~2.0%), while most populations of Native Americans, East Asians, and South Asians have similar amounts (~0.1%). This suggests Denisovan populations were distributed across Asia. Evidence also suggests that there was interbreeding with the Altai Neanderthal population, with about 17% of the Denisovan genome from Denisova Cave deriving from them. A first-generation hybrid nicknamed "Denny" was discovered with a Denisovan father and a Neanderthal mother. Additionally, 4% of the Denisovan genome comes from admixture with Asian Homo erectus (also known as Peking Man) which diverged from Denisovans, Neanderthals and modern humans over one million years ago.

== Taxonomy ==
Locations of paleoarchaeological finds linked to Denisovans: Denisova Cave (blue) in the Altai Mountains of Siberia; Baishiya Karst Cave (yellow) on the Tibetan Plateau; Harbin (green) in Manchuria; Penghu (red) in the Taiwan Strait; Tam Ngu Hao 2 Cave (grey) in northern Laos; Bianfu Cave (purple) in Yunnan; and Xujiayao (orange) in Hebei) in

Cladogram based on palaeoproteomics:

- - - Australopithecina
      Paranthropus†
    - Homo
      - Homo antecessor†
      - - - Homo neanderthalensis†
          - Denisovan: Homo longi (Harbin)†
        - Homo sapiens

Cladogram of Homo longi (Denisovans) based on Feng et al., 2025:
★ indicates genetically confirmed Denisovans

- - Homo longi (Denisovans) 1197.44
    - Maba
    - 1142.08
      - 443.13
        - Penghu 1★
        - Denisova cave★
        - Xujiayao★
      - 1100.23
        - Jinniushan
        - 1060.91
          - Xiahe★
          - Hualongdong
          - Harbin★
          - - Yunxian
            - Dali

Denisovans might represent a new species of Homo or an archaic subspecies of Homo sapiens (modern humans), but up until the Harbin cranium was identified as a Denisovan in June 2025 through the mitochondrial DNA and autosomal proteomics there were too few fossils to erect a proper taxon. Proactively proposed species names without type specimen designation for Denisovans include H. sapiens altaiensis or H. altaiensis (Derevianko, 2011), H. denisoviensis (Picq, 2011), H. denisovan (Gabriel & Mihaela, 2011), and H. denisova (Gunbin et al., 2012).

In 2025, Denné Reed argued that the informal name "Denisovans" represents the better system than proactively proposed names to reference this archaic human group due to its uncertain biological status as an independent evolutionary lineage. He suggested that "H. altaiensis" represents a nomen nudum ("naked name"), since its description lacks differential diagnosis, does not clearly display the intent of naming a new species and lacks a fixed type specimen. He also suggested that the names "Homo daliensis" and "Homo mapaensis" are conditionally proposed which makes them unavailable based on ICZN article 15, while considered "Homo tsaichangensis" (intended name for Penghu 1 in a self-published digital book) to be unpublished and unavailable, as it does not contain evidence of ZooBank registration within the published work which fails to conform to the ICZN articles 8.5.3.1 and 8.5.3.2.

Research published in 2024 proposed classifying Denisovans as part of the conditional species Homo juluensis based on the similarities between Denisovan and H. juluensis molars, prior to the classification of Denisovans as Homo longi based on DNA evidence.

Some older findings called "East Asian Archaics" have been associated in studies with the Denisovans but may or may not belong to the Denisovan line. Such findings include the Dali skull, the Xuchang crania, the Jinniushan human, the Hualongdong people, Yunxian Man, Maba Man, and the Narmada Human.

In 2021, Chinese palaeoanthropologist Qiang Ji and colleagues suggested that their newly erected species, H. longi, may represent the Denisovans, based on the similarity between the type specimen's molar and that of the Xiahe mandible. In 2024, paleoanthropologists Christopher Bae and Xiujie Wu designated the Xujiayao fossils as the holotype of the species Homo juluensis with Xuchang as the paratype, and suggested sinking Denisovans into this species. They recommended relegating the Dali Man and the similar specimen Jinniushan to H. longi.

In 2025, Fu and colleagues retrieved mitochondrial DNA from the dental calculus of the Harbin cranium (H. longi holotype), reporting that it falls within the variation of seven previously sequenced Denisovan mitochondrial DNA. Fu et al. (2025) also retrieved 95 endogenous proteins from the same specimen, and suggested that H. longi can be confidently assigned to a Denisovan population. In 2025, Feng and colleagues, the team that published the Harbin cranium in 2021 and named the new species Homo longi, ran a morphometric analysis of 104 ancient hominin cranial and mandibular specimens using 533 morphometric landmarks and grouped Yunxian Man, Dali Man, the Hualongdong people, the Jinniushan human, the Xujiayao hominins, and Maba Man under H. longi alongside the genetically confirmed Denisovans. In 2026, Xing and colleagues performed proteomic analysis of two fragments from the Xujiayao fossil assemblage, the holotype of Homo juluensis, and identified that their protein sequences are consistent with those of Denisovans.

=== Discovery ===
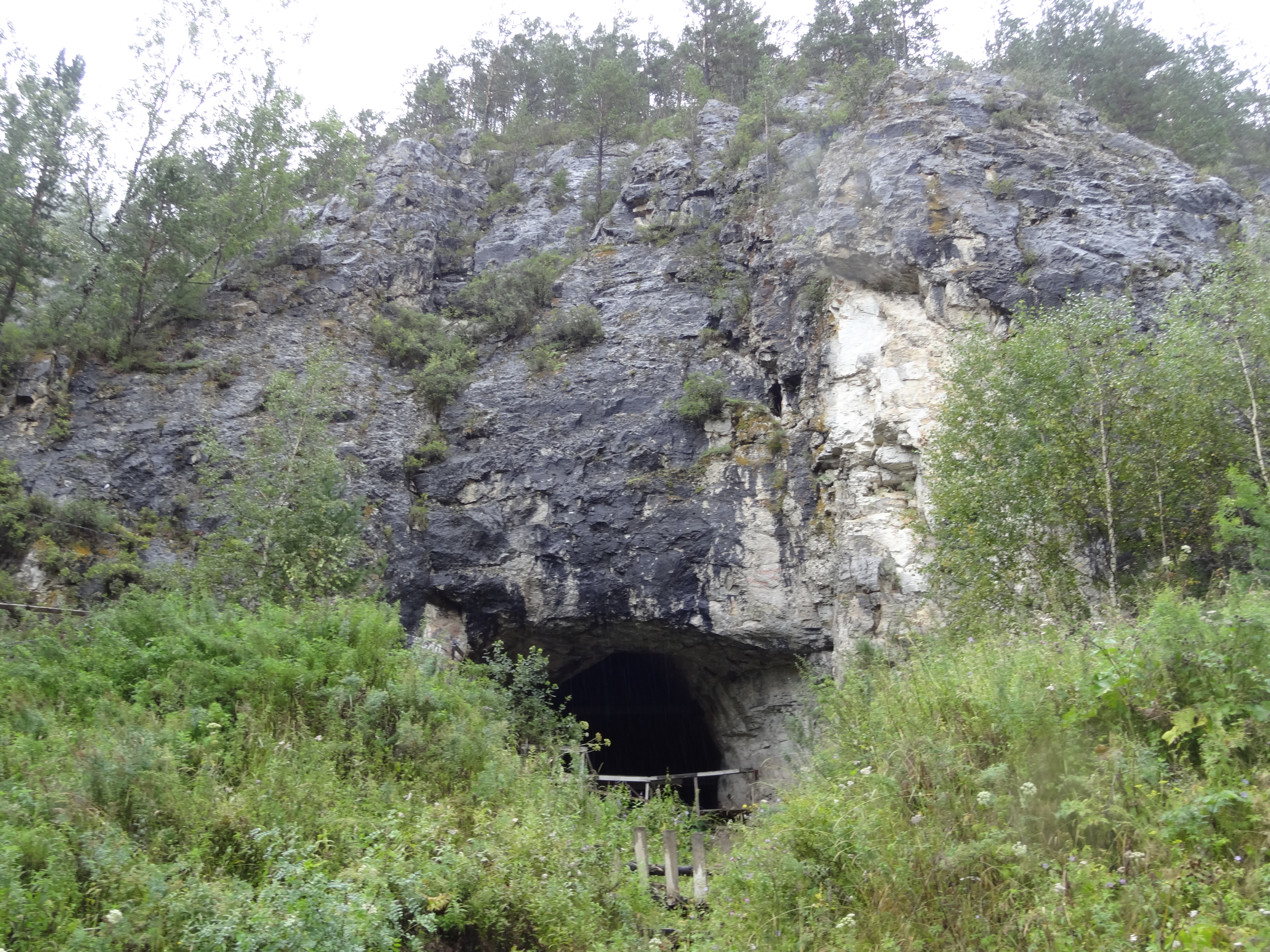
The Denisova Cave, where the first reported Denisovans were found

The Denisova Cave is located in Altai Krai, Russia, in south-central Siberia, on the western edges of the Altai Mountains. It is named after Denis (Dyonisiy), a Russian Old Believer hermit who lived there in the 18th century. The cave was first inspected for fossils in the 1970s by Soviet paleontologist Nikolai Ovodov, who was looking for remains of canids.

In 2008, Michael Shunkov from the Russian Academy of Sciences and other Russian archaeologists from the Institute of Archaeology and Ethnography of the Siberian Branch of the Russian Academy of Sciences in Novosibirsk Akademgorodok investigated the cave and found the finger bone of a juvenile female hominin originally dated to 50,000–30,000 years ago. The estimate has changed to 76,200–51,600 years ago. The specimen was originally named X-woman because matrilineal mitochondrial DNA (mtDNA) extracted from the bone demonstrated it to belong to a novel ancient hominin, genetically distinct both from contemporary modern humans and from Neanderthals.

In 2019, Greek archaeologist Katerina Douka and colleagues radiocarbon dated specimens from Denisova Cave, and estimated that Denisova 2 (the oldest specimen) lived 195,000–122,700 years ago. Older Denisovan DNA collected from sediments in the East Chamber dates to 217,000 years ago. Based on artifacts also discovered in the cave, hominin occupation (most likely by Denisovans) began 287±41 or 203±14 ka. Neanderthals were also present 193±12 ka and 97±11 ka, possibly concurrently with Denisovans.

=== Specimens ===
The fossils of multiple distinct Denisovan individuals from Denisova Cave have been identified through their ancient DNA (aDNA): Denisova 2, 3, 4, 8, 11, 19, 20, 21 and 25. An mtDNA-based phylogenetic analysis of these individuals suggested that Denisova 19, 20, and 21 are the oldest, followed by Denisova 2, then Denisova 8; while Denisova 3 and Denisova 4 were roughly contemporaneous. The mtDNA from Denisova 4 bore a high similarity to that of Denisova 3, indicating that they belonged to the same population.

Denisova Cave contained the only known examples of Denisovans until 2019, when a research group led by Fahu Chen, Dongju Zhang, and Jean-Jacques Hublin described a partial mandible discovered in 1980 by a Buddhist monk in the Baishiya Karst Cave on the Tibetan Plateau in China. Known as the Xiahe mandible, the fossil became part of the collection of Lanzhou University, where it remained unstudied until 2010. It was determined by ancient protein analysis to contain collagen that by sequence was found to have close affiliation to that of the Denisovans from Denisova Cave, while uranium decay dating of the carbonate crust enshrouding the specimen indicated it was more than 160,000 years old. The identity of this population was later confirmed through study of environmental DNA, which found Denisovan mtDNA in sediment layers ranging in date from 100,000 to 60,000 years before present, and perhaps more recent. A 2024 reanalysis identified a partial Denisovan rib fragment dating to between 48,000 and 32,000 BP.

In 2018, a team of Laotian, French, and American anthropologists, who had been excavating caves in the Laotian Annamite Mountains since 2008, was directed by local children to the site Tam Ngu Hao 2 ("Cobra Cave") where they recovered a human tooth. The tooth (catalogue number TNH2-1) developmentally matches a 3.5 to 8.5 year old, and a lack of amelogenin (a protein on the Y chromosome) suggests it belonged to a girl, barring extreme degradation of the protein over a long period of time. Dental proteome analysis was inconclusive for this specimen, but the team found it anatomically comparable with the Xiahe mandible, and so they categorized it as a Denisovan. The tooth probably dates to 164,000 to 131,000 years ago.

In 2022, a team from Germany, Austria, Russia and the UK found three Denisovans (Denisova 19, 20, 21) from layer 15 of the East Chamber, in Denisova Cave. It turns out that the mtDNA sequences of Denisova 19 and 21 are identical, indicating that they may belong to the same individual or be maternal relatives. The divergence date for the mtDNAs of the three new and the four previously published Denisovans is 229 ka (206–252 ka 95% Cl) during the Interglacial period MIS 7. The genetic diversity among the Denisovans from Denisova Cave is on the lower range of what is seen in modern humans, and is comparable to that of Neanderthals. However, it is possible that the inhabitants of Denisova Cave were more or less reproductively isolated from other Denisovans, and that, across their entire range, Denisovan genetic diversity may have been much higher.

In 2024, scientists announced the sequence of Denisova 25, which was in a layer dated to 200 ka. During DNA sequencing, low proportions of the Denisova 2, Denisova 4 and Denisova 8 genomes were found to have survived, but high proportions of the Denisova 3 and Denisova 25 genomes were intact. The Denisova 3 sample was cut into two, and the initial DNA sequencing of one fragment was later independently confirmed by sequencing the mtDNA from the second.

In 2008, a Taiwanese citizen purchased a fossil Homo mandible, dredged from the sea floor of the Taiwan Strait, from an antique shop and donated it to the Taiwan National Museum of Natural Science. Attempts to extract DNA were unsuccessful, but in 2025 protein analysis of the specimen, designated Penghu 1, was published showing that it belonged to a male Denisovan. In September 2026, ancient proteins identified five specimens from Bianfu Cave in Yunnan, including the first known Denisovan radius, as Denisovan.

In 2018, a relatively complete skull was reported from Harbin, China, and was described in 2021 as H. longi. In 2025, mtDNA and proteomic analysis confirmed that this skull is a Denisovan.

The following list is the currently known specimens of Denisovans, with colored specimens being proposed through morphometric analyses only without mitogenome or proteomic analyses:

Name	Fossil elements	Age	Discovery	Place	Sex and age	Publication	Image	GenBank / Genebase accession
Denisova 3 (also known as X Woman)	Distal phalanx of the fifth finger	76.2–51.6 ka	2008	Denisova cave (Russia)	13.5-year-old adolescent female	2010	Replica of part of the phalanx.	NC013993
Denisova 4	Permanent upper 2nd or 3rd molar	84.1–55.2 ka	2000	Denisova cave (Russia)	Adult male	2010	Replica of the molar of Denisova. Part of the roots was destroyed to study the mtDNA. Their size and shape indicate it is neither neanderthal nor sapiens.	FR695060
Denisova 8	Permanent upper 3rd molar	136.4–105.6 ka	2010	Denisova cave (Russia)	Adult male	2015		KT780370
Denisova 2	Deciduous 2nd lower molar	194.4–122.7 ka	1984	Denisova cave (Russia)	Adolescent female	2017		KX663333
Xiahe mandible	Partial mandible	> 160 ka	1980	Baishiya Cave (China)		2019		
Penghu 1	Partial mandible	130 to 190 kya or 10 to 70 kya	2008	Penghu Channel (Taiwan)	Adult male	2015	Added Penghu 1	
Denisova 11 (also known as Denny, Denisovan × Neanderthal hybrid)	Arm or leg bone fragment	118.1–79.3 ka	2012	Denisova cave (Russia)	13 year old adolescent female	2016		KU131206
Denisova 13	Parietal bone fragment	Layer 17, 202-167 ka	2019	Denisova cave (Russia)		pending		
TNH2–1	Permanent lower left 1st or 2nd molar	164–131 ka	2018	Tam Ngu Hao 2 cave (Laos)	3.5 to 8.5-year-old female	2022		
Denisova 19	Undiagnostic bone fragment	Layer 15, 217–187 ka	2012–13	Denisova cave (Russia)		2022		
Denisova 20	Undiagnostic bone fragment	Layer 15, 217–187 ka	2012–13	Denisova cave (Russia)		2022		
Denisova 21	Undiagnostic bone fragment	Layer 15, 217–187 ka	2012–13	Denisova cave (Russia)		2022		
BSY-19-B896-1 (Xiahe 2)	Distal rib fragment	48-32 ka	1980	Baishiya Cave (China)	Unknown	2024		
Denisova 25	Molar	200 ka	2024	Denisova cave (Russia)	Male	pending		
Bianfu Cave	3 molars, 2 parietal bone fragments, a proximal radial fragment	143 ka and 102 ka	2026	Bianfu Cave, Yunnan (China)	Unknown	2026		
Harbin cranium (holotype of Homo longi, also known as the Dragon Man)	Complete skull	>146 ka	1933?	Harbin (China)	Adult male aged approximately 50 years	2021		C_AA108316
Xujiayao hominin (holotype of Homo juluensis)	12 parietal bones, 1 temporal bone, 2 occipital bones, 1 mandibular bone fragment, 1 juvenile maxilla, and 3 isolated teeth.	199–138 ka	1976–1979	Houjiayao village in Yangyuan County, Hebei. (China)	Adult and juvenile	2011		
Dali cranium	Complete skull	260±20 ka	1978	Dali County (China)	Adult	1981		
Jinniushan human	Fragments of the skull cap (cranium), ribs, hand, pelvis, and leg bones	260±20 ka	1984	Jinniushan (China)	Adult female	1985		
HLD 6	11 fossil parts belong to a single individual	300 ka	2014–2016, 2020	Hualong Cave (China)	Juvenile 12–13 years old	2019		
Xuchang Man (paratype of Homo juluensis)	2 fragmentary partial crania	125-105 ka	2007, 2014	Lingjing, Xuchang, Henan (China)	Adult	2017		
Maba 1 (PA 84)	Partial skull, a skull cap and parts of the right upper face, with parts of the nose also still attached	300–130 ka	1958	Lion Cave (Shiziyan), Maba, near Shaoguan city in the northern part of Guangdong province (China)	Adult middle-aged male	1959		

=== Evolution ===
The nuclear DNA (nDNA) of Denisova 3—which had an unusual degree of DNA preservation with only low-level contamination—shows that Denisovans and Neanderthals were more closely related to each other than they were to modern humans. Using the percent distance from human–chimpanzee last common ancestor, Denisovans/Neanderthals split from modern humans about 804,000 years ago, and from each other 640,000 years ago. Using a mutation rate of 1×10^{−9} or 0.5×10^{−9} per base pair (bp) per year, the Neanderthal/Denisovan split occurred around either 236–190,000 or 473–381,000 years ago respectively. Using 1.1×10^{−8} per generation with a new generation every 29 years, the time is 744,000 years ago. Using 5×10^{−10} nucleotide site per year, it is 616,000 years ago. Using the latter dates, the split had likely already occurred by the time hominins spread out across Europe. H. heidelbergensis is typically considered to have been the direct ancestor of Denisovans and Neanderthals, and sometimes also modern humans. Due to the strong divergence in dental anatomy, they may have split before characteristic Neanderthal dentition evolved about 300,000 years ago.

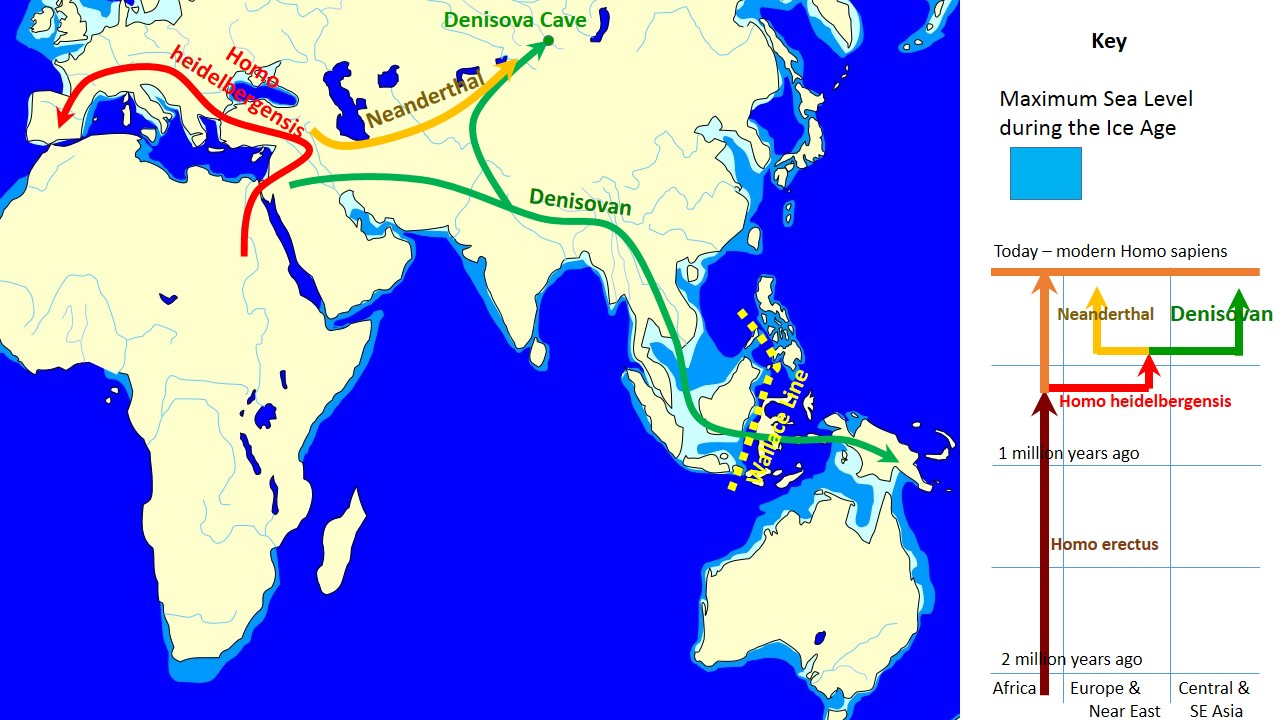
The evolution and geographic spread of Denisovans as compared with Neanderthals, Homo heidelbergensis and Homo erectus

Sequenced mitochondrial DNA (mtDNA), preserved by the cool climate of the cave (average temperature is at freezing point), was extracted from Denisova 3 by a team of scientists led by Johannes Krause and Svante Pääbo from the Max Planck Institute for Evolutionary Anthropology in Leipzig, Germany. Denisova 3's mtDNA differs from that of modern humans by 385 bases (nucleotides) out of approximately 16,500, whereas the difference between modern humans and Neanderthals is around 202 bases. In comparison, the difference between chimpanzees and modern humans is approximately 1,462 mtDNA base pairs. This suggested that Denisovan mtDNA diverged from that of modern humans and Neanderthals about 1,313,500–779,300 years ago; whereas modern human and Neanderthal mtDNA diverged 618,000–321,200 years ago.

Modern humans contributed mtDNA to the Neanderthal lineage, but not to the Denisovan mitochondrial genomes yet sequenced. The mtDNA sequence from the femur of a 400,000-year-old early Neanderthal from the Sima de los Huesos Cave in Spain was found to be closer to Denisovans, and the authors posited that this mtDNA represents an archaic sequence which was subsequently lost in Neanderthals due to replacement by a modern-human-related sequence.

In 2020, the sequencing of Denisovan Y chromosomes (Denisova 4 and Denisova 8), as well as the Y chromosomes of three late Neanderthals (Spy 94a, Mezmaiskaya 2 and El Sidrón 1253) showed that the Denisovan Y chromosomes split around 700 thousand years ago (kya) from a lineage shared by Neanderthal and modern human Y chromosomes, which diverged from each other around 370 thousand years ago. The phylogenetic relationships of archaic and modern human Y chromosomes differ from the population relationships inferred from the autosomal genomes and mirror mitochondrial DNA phylogenies, indicating replacement of both the mitochondrial and Y chromosomal gene pools in late Neanderthals.

== Demographics ==
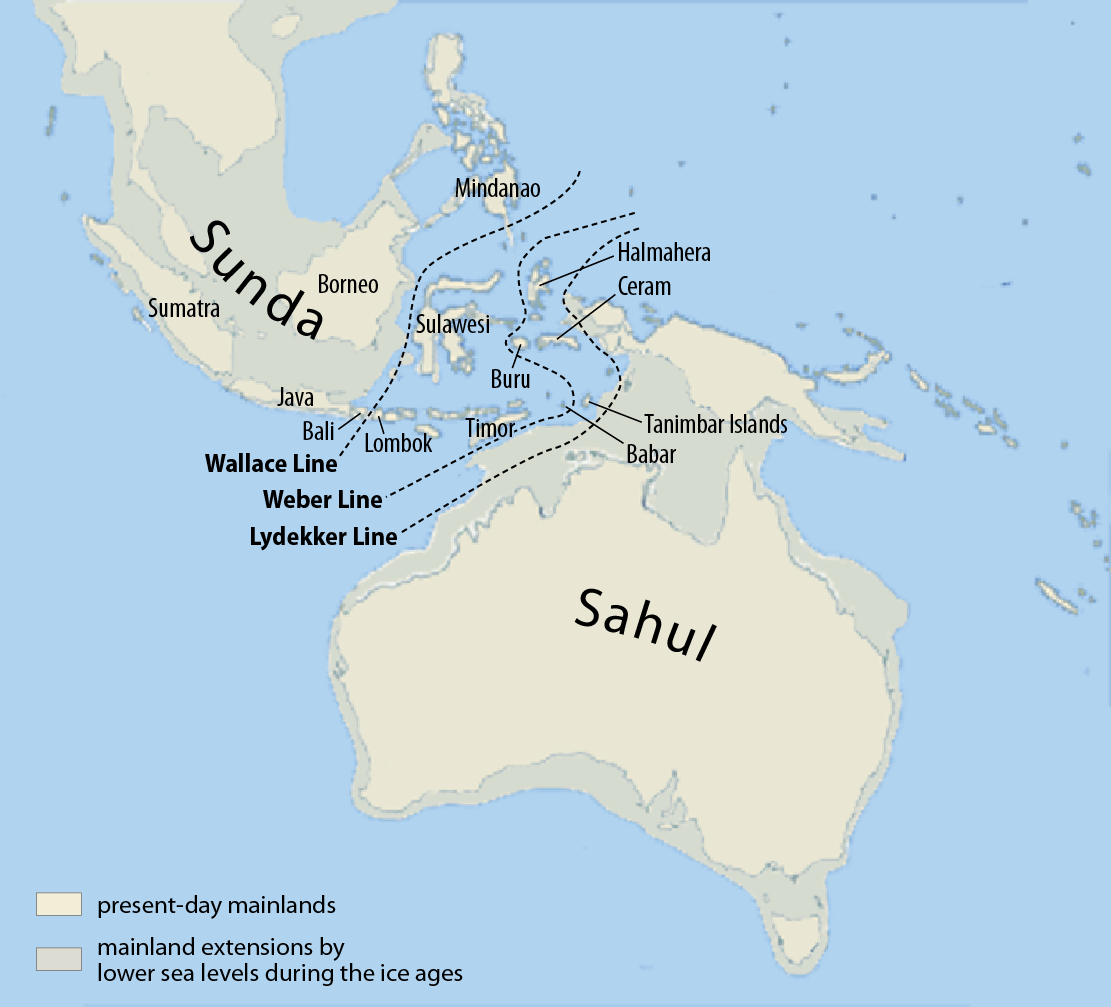
Denisovans appear to have crossed the Wallace Line.

Denisovans are known to have lived in Siberia, Tibet, Central Eastern China, Southwest China, Laos, Taiwan and Manchuria. The Xiahe mandible is the earliest recorded human presence on the Tibetan Plateau. Although their remains have been identified in only these seven locations, traces of Denisovan DNA in modern humans suggest they ranged across East Asia.

In 2019, geneticist Guy Jacobs and colleagues identified three distinct Denisovan populations responsible for introgression into modern populations now native to: Siberia and East Asia; New Guinea and nearby islands; and Oceania and, to a lesser extent, across Asia. Using coalescent modeling, the Denisova Cave Denisovans split from the second population about 283,000 years ago, and from the third population about 363,000 years ago. This indicates that there was considerable reproductive isolation between Denisovan populations. Using exponential distribution analysis on haplotype lengths, Jacobs calculated introgression into modern humans occurred about 29,900 years ago with the Denisovan population ancestral to New Guineans; and 45,700 years ago with the population ancestral to both New Guineans and Oceanians. A third wave appears to have introgressed into East Asia, but there is not enough DNA evidence to pinpoint a solid timeframe. Denisovan DNA segments discovered in modern populations east Asia have more similarities with the Denisovan reference genome from the Altai mountains, compared to the Denisovan segments found in Southeast Asia and Oceania.

In a 2024 study, scientist Danat Yermakovich, of the University of Tartu, discovered that people living at different elevations in Papua New Guinea have differences in Denisovan DNA, with people living in the highlands having variants for early brain development and those living in the lowlands having variants for the immune system. Based on the high percentages of Denisovan DNA in modern Papuans and Australians, Denisovans may have crossed the Wallace Line into these regions (with little back-migration west), the second known human species to do so, along with earlier Homo floresiensis. By this logic, they may also have entered the Philippines, living alongside Homo luzonensis, which, if so, may represent the same or a closely related species. These Denisovans may have needed to cross large bodies of water. Alternately, high Denisovan DNA admixture in modern Papuan populations may simply represent higher mixing among the original ancestors of Papuans prior to crossing the Wallace line.

Denisova Cave, over time of habitation, continually swung from a fairly warm and moderately humid pine and birch forest to tundra or forest-tundra landscape. Conversely, Baishiya Karst Cave is situated at a high elevation, an area characterized by low temperature, low oxygen, and poor resource availability. Colonization of high-altitude regions, due to such harsh conditions, was previously assumed to have only been accomplished by modern humans. Denisovans seem to have also inhabited Southeast Asia. The Tam Ngu Hao 2 site might have been a closed forest environment.

== Anatomy ==
The finger bone is within the modern human range of variation for women, which is in contrast to the large, robust molars which are more similar to those of Middle to Late Pleistocene archaic humans. All the available molars are outside the range of any Homo species except H. habilis and H. rudolfensis, and is more like those of australopithecines. The second molar is larger than those of modern humans and Neanderthals, and is more similar to those of H. erectus and H. habilis. Like Neanderthals, the mandible had a gap behind the molars, and the front teeth were flattened; but Denisovans lacked a high mandibular body, and the mandibular symphysis at the midline of the jaw was more receding.

The Denisovan Harbin cranium, Homo longi is characterized by a low and long skull, receding forehead, extremely wide upper face, a large nasal opening equating to an enlarged nose (possibly an adaptation to the cold air), large and square eye sockets, inflated and thick brow ridges (supraorbital torus), flat cheekbones (zygomatic bone), a wide palate and large tooth sockets (equating to a large mouth), and a broad base of the skull. The Harbin skull is the longest archaic human skull to date. The Harbin skull also has the longest brow ridge of any archaic or modern cranium.

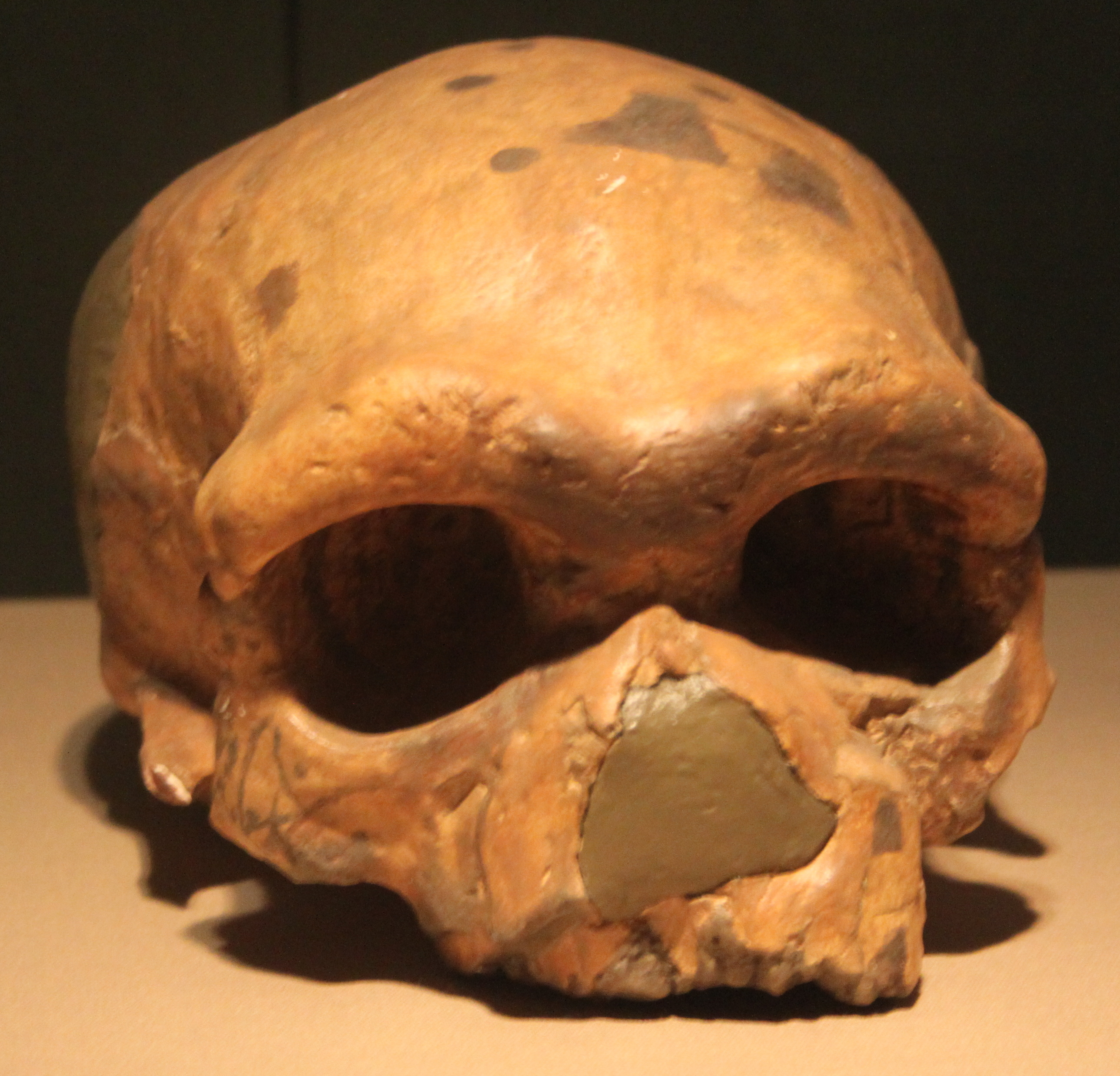
The Harbin skull is similar to the contemporaneous Dali skull (reconstruction above).

The Harbin cranium had a massive brain at roughly 1,420 cc, above the range of all known human species except modern humans and Neanderthals. Nonetheless, post-orbital constriction (a constriction of the braincase just behind the eyes, absent in modern humans, and equating to the location of the frontal lobes) is more developed in H. longi than in Neanderthals, although not so much as in more-ancient human species.

Despite the face being so wide, it was rather flat (reduced mid-facial prognathism), and resembles the anatomy found in modern humans, the far more ancient H. antecessor, and other Middle Pleistocene Chinese specimens. This gives the Harbin cranium features that are similar to that of modern humans, but in fact, this is likely an ancestral trait.

Because the original describers judged the Harbin skull to be closely allied with the Xiahe mandible, they believed H. longi lacked a chin, like other archaic humans, but the specimen's lower jaw was not recovered. This lack of a chin is also present in the Denisovan Penghu mandible.

Both Ni et al. (2021) and Bae and Wu (2024) group the Harbin cranium, Homo longi, together with the Dali cranium and the skeleton from Jinniushan into a Homo longi clade. Feng et al. (2025) group Yunxian Man, Dali Man, the Hualongdong people, the Jinniushan human, the Xujiayao hominins, and Maba Man under H. longi alongside the genetically confirmed Denisovans. Therefore, according to these studies, the morphological characteristics of these remains can be also applied to Denisovans in general.

Because Jinniushan has abundant post-cranial remains, and is also grouped with Homo longi in several studies, it is very likely that these remains also belong to a Denisovan as well. This would enable a description of the post-cranial (body) morphology of the Denisovans.

The human fossil elements at Jinniushan all belong to one female individual. The fossil remains consist of one cranium, six vertebrae (one cervical, five thoracic), one complete left os coxae (pelvic bone), one complete left ulna, one complete left patella (kneecap), two left ribs, and several hand and feet bones. Analysis of the left-half of the pelvis (hip bone) in 2006 indicated that the individual was a woman. Like the Harbin cranium, a distinguishing feature of the Jinniushan female is its large brain with a brain size (cranial capacity) of 1,330 cm^{3} (81 cu in). Quoting Rosenberg et al. (2006) the "Reconstructed stature using this formula is 168.78 ± 4.30 cm." "we have used the mean of these two estimates, 78.6 kg, as the estimated body weight". Therefore, we have an estimate of the body proportions, height, and weight of an adult female Denisovan (Homo longi), making it the largest female specimen ever discovered in the fossil record, although within the range of modern human females.

The Denisovan genome from Denisova Cave has variants of genes which, in modern humans, are associated with dark skin, brown hair, and brown eyes. The Denisovan genome also contains a variant region around the EPAS1 gene that in Tibetans assists with adaptation to low oxygen levels at high elevation, and in a region containing the WARS2 and TBX15 loci which affect body-fat distribution in the Inuit.

== Culture ==
=== Denisova Cave ===
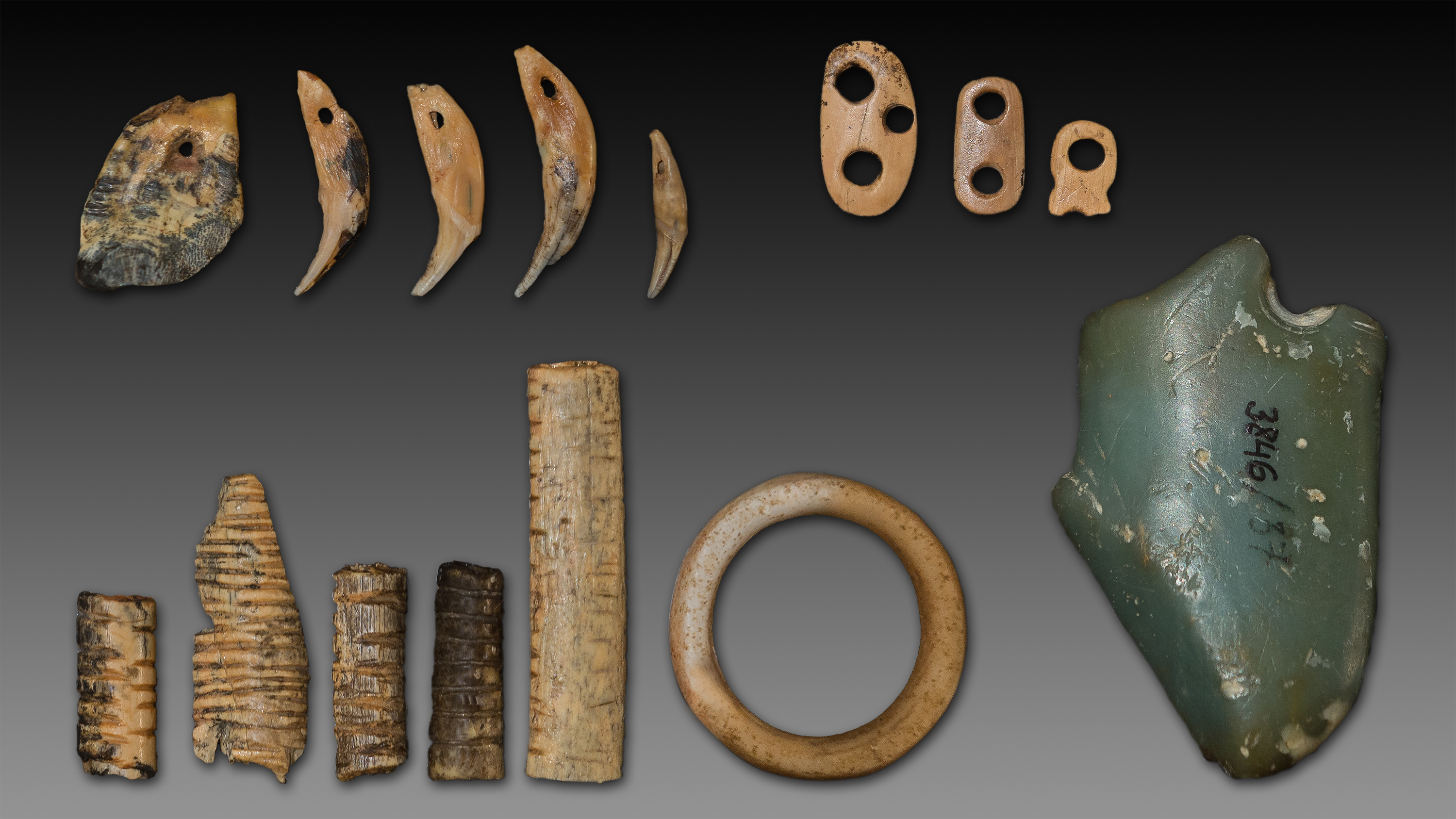
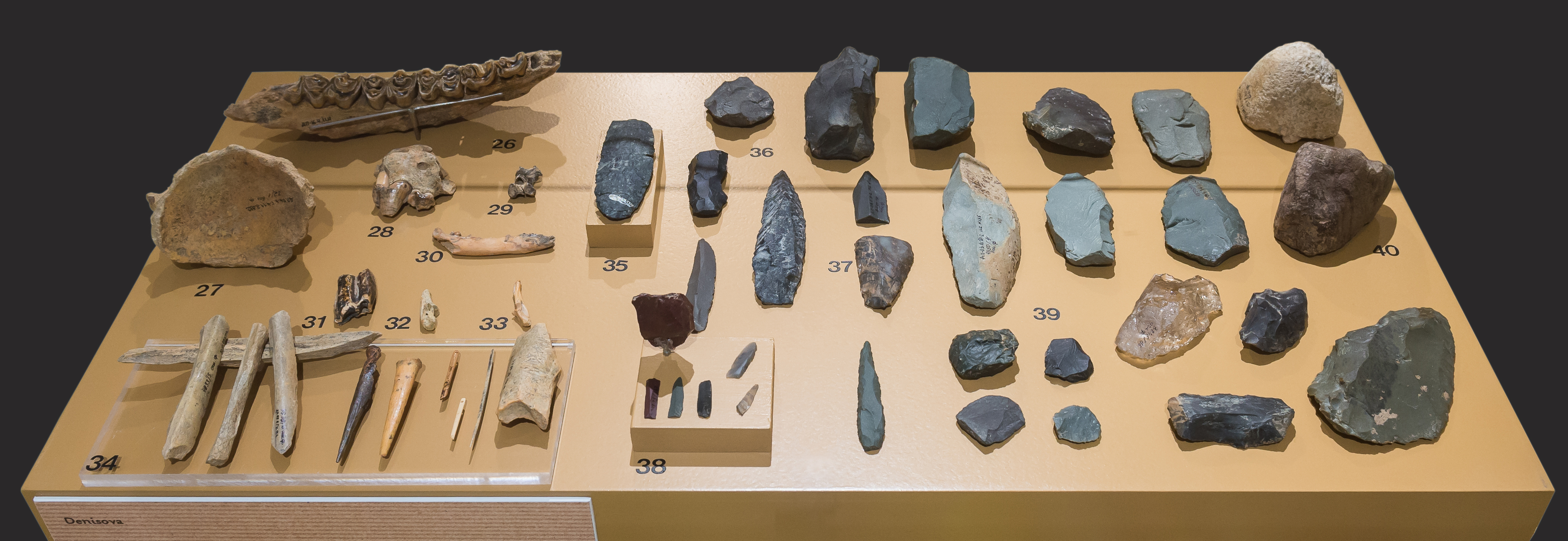
Some ornaments (above) and animal bones and stone tools (below) found in Denisova Cave. Note, ornaments may have been crafted by modern humans.

Early Middle Paleolithic stone tools from Denisova Cave included cores, scrapers, denticulate tools, and notched tools, deposited about 287±41 thousand years ago in the Main Chamber of the cave; and about 269±97 thousand years ago in the South Chamber; up to 170±19 thousand and 187±14 thousand years ago in the Main and East Chambers, respectively.

Middle Paleolithic assemblages were dominated by flat, discoidal, and Levallois cores, with some isolated sub-prismatic cores. There were predominantly side scrapers (a scraper with only the sides used to scrape), but also notched-denticulate tools, end-scrapers (a scraper with only the ends used to scrape), burins, chisel-like tools, and truncated flakes. These dated to 156±15 thousand years ago in the Main Chamber, 58±6 thousand years ago in the East Chamber, and 136±26–47±8 thousand years ago in the South Chamber.

Early Upper Paleolithic artefacts date to 44±5 thousand years ago in the Main Chamber, 63±6 thousand years ago in the East Chamber, and 47±8 thousand years ago in the South Chamber, though some layers of the East Chamber seem to have been disturbed. There was blade production and Levallois production, but scrapers were again predominant. A well-developed, Upper Paleolithic stone bladelet technology, distinct from the previous scrapers, began accumulating in the Main Chamber around 36±4 thousand years ago.

In the Upper Paleolithic layers, there were also several bone tools and ornaments: a marble ring, an ivory ring, an ivory pendant, a red deer tooth pendant, an elk tooth pendant, a chloritolite bracelet, and a bone needle. However, Denisovans are only confirmed to have inhabited the cave until 55 ka; the dating of Upper Paleolithic artefacts overlaps with modern human migration into Siberia (though there are no occurrences in the Altai region); and the DNA of the only specimen in the cave dating to the time interval (Denisova 14) is too degraded to confirm species identity, so the attribution of these artefacts is unclear.

=== Tibet ===
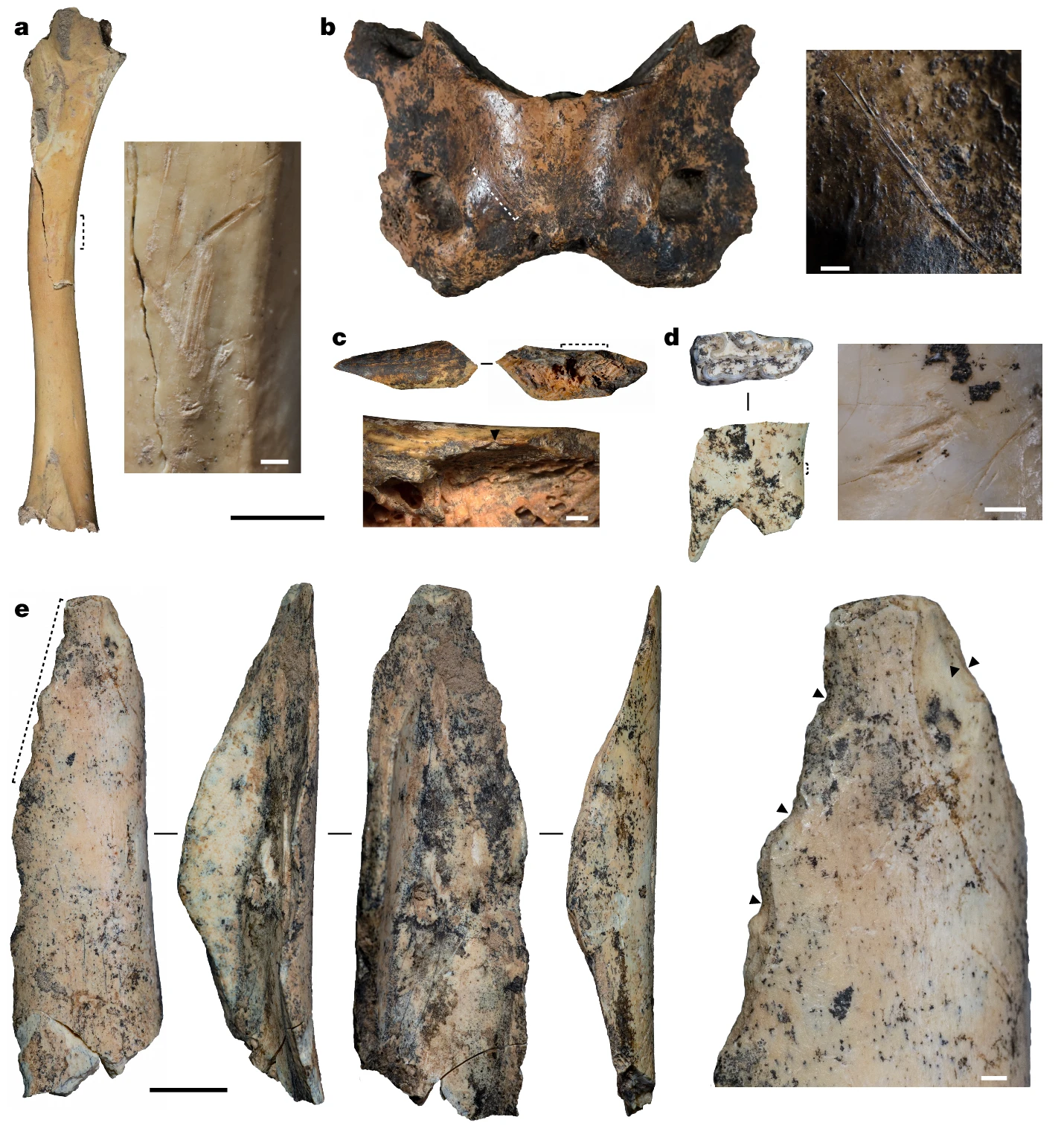
Butchered bones and bone tools from Baishiya Karst Cave: a) golden eagle, b) cave hyena, c) marmot, d) horse, e) goat antelope

The inhabitants of Baishiya Karst Cave seem to have been extensively processing goat antelopes, cows, deer, horses, and woolly rhinoceros. They were also butchering large carnivores (cave hyena, dog, and big cat), marmots, hare, and eagles. They may have also used these animals' long bones to make bone tools, and additionally there are stone artefacts in each layer excavated.

In 1998, five child hand- and footprint impressions were discovered in a travertine unit near the Quesang hot springs in Tibet; in 2021, they were dated to 226 to 169 thousand years ago using uranium decay dating. This is the oldest evidence of human occupation of the Tibetan Plateau, and since the Xiahe mandible is the oldest human fossil from the region (though younger than the Quesang impressions), these may have been made by Denisovan children. The impressions were printed onto a small panel of space, and there is little overlap between all the prints, so they seem to have been taking care to make new imprints in unused space. If considered art, they are the oldest known examples of rock art. Similar hand stencils and impressions do not appear again in the archeological record until roughly 40,000 years ago.

The footprints comprise four right impressions and one left superimposed on one of the right. They were probably left by two individuals. The tracks of the individual who superimposed their left onto their right may have scrunched up their toes and wiggled them in the mud, or dug their finger into the toe prints. The footprints average 192.3 mm (7.57 in) long, which roughly equates to a 7- or 8-year-old child by modern human growth rates. There are two sets of handprints (from a left and right hand), which may have been created by an older child unless one of the former two individuals had long fingers. The handprints average 161.1 mm (6.34 in), which roughly equates with a 12-year-old modern human child, and the middle finger length agrees with a 17-year-old modern human. One of the handprints shows an impression of the forearm, and the individual was wiggling their thumb through the mud.

=== Yunnan ===
In 2025, archaeologists discovered an assemblage of 35 wooden implements on the shores of an ancient lake from the site of Gantangqing (甘棠箐) in Yunnan southwestern China, which was found associated with stone tools, antler billets (soft hammers), and cut-marked bones and is dated from ~361,000 to ~250,000 years at a 95% confidence interval, at a time when Denisovans were known to have inhabited the general region. The wooden implements include digging sticks made of pine and hardwood, hooks for cutting roots, and small, complete, hand-held pointed tools.

"Our results suggest that hominins at Gantangqing made strategic utilization of lakeshore food resources," the researchers wrote in the study. "They made planned visits to the lakeshore and brought with them fabricated tools of selected wood for exploiting underground tubers, rhizomes, or corms. As such, the Gantangqing assemblage shows the likely use of underground storage organs and the importance of plant foods in early hominin diets in a subtropical environment."

=== Hebei ===
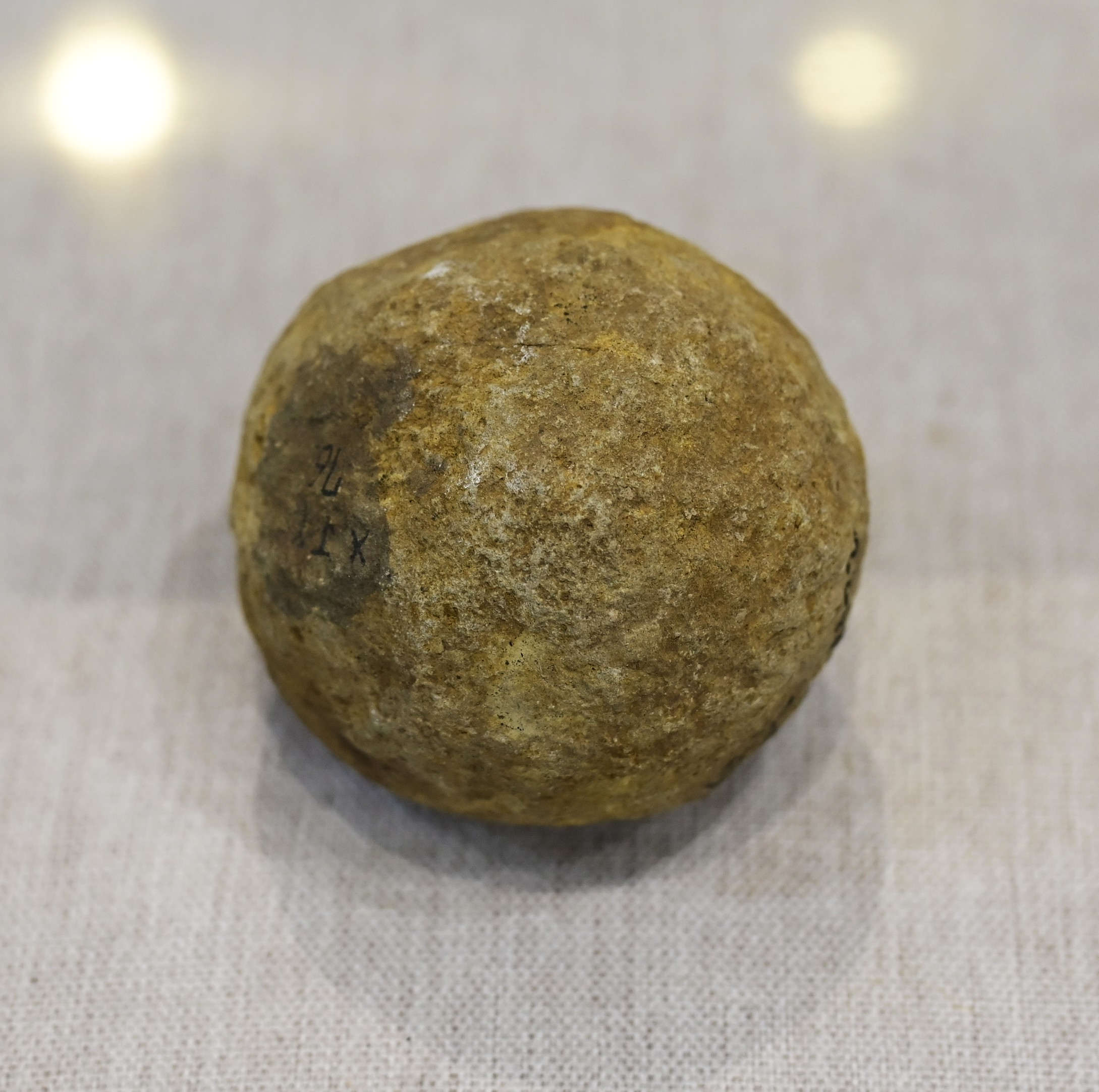
Stone ball from Xujiayao, Paleozoological Museum of China

In 2026, researchers using dental proteomes identified two teeth from the Xujiayao fossil assemblage as Denisovan. Almost 30,000 lithic, bone and antler artefacts were unearthed at the Xujiayao sites.

== Interbreeding ==
Hominin timeline
← / Earlier apes; ← / Gorilla split; ← / Chimpanzee split; ← / Earliest bipedal; ← / Earliest sign of Ardipithecus; ← / Earliest sign of Australopithecus; ← / Earliest stone tools; ← / Earliest sign of Homo; ← / Dispersal beyond Africa; ← / Earliest fire / cooking; ← / Earliest rock art; ← / Earliest clothes; ← / Modern humans
(million years ago)

Analyses of the modern human genomes indicate past interbreeding with at least two groups of archaic humans—Neanderthals and Denisovans—and that interbreeding events occurred multiple times. Comparisons of the Denisovan, Neanderthal, and modern human genomes have revealed evidence of a complex web of interbreeding among these lineages.

=== Neanderthals ===
As much as 17% of the Denisovan genome from Denisova Cave represents DNA from the local Neanderthal population. Denisova 11 was an F1 (first generation) Denisovan/Neanderthal hybrid; the fact that such an individual was found may indicate interbreeding was a common occurrence here. The Denisovan genome shares more derived alleles with the Altai Neanderthal genome from Siberia than with the Vindija Cave Neanderthal genome from Croatia or the Mezmaiskaya cave Neanderthal genome from the Caucasus, suggesting that the gene flow came from a population that was more closely related to the local Altai Neanderthals. However, Denny's Denisovan father had the typical Altai Neanderthal introgression, while her Neanderthal mother represented a population more closely related to Vindija Neanderthals. Denisova 25, dated to 200 ka, is estimated to have inherited 5% of his genome from a previously unknown population of Neanderthals, and came from a different population of Denisovans than the younger samples.

The Denisovan haplotype for the MUC19 gene was also found in the late Neanderthals from Chagyrskaya Cave in the Altai Republic in Siberia and Vindija in Croatia in Europe, which provides proof that late Neanderthals from both Europe and Asia had Denisovan admixture.

=== "Superarchaic" hominins ===
A 2020 study suggested that before splitting from Neanderthals, their ancestors ("Neandersovans") migrated into Eurasia and interbred with an unidentified "superarchaic" human species who were already present there; these superarchaics were the descendants of a very early migration out of Africa around 1.9 mya. It has also been hypothesised that Denisovans received gene flow (0.5–8% of total genome) from "superarchaics" that was not shared with Neanderthals.

In May 2026, a study of the sequences of the dental proteomes of six Chinese Middle Pleistocene aged Homo erectus individuals from the Zhoukoudian, Hexian and Sunjiadong sites, suggested to span from around 780,000 to 300,000 years ago, showed that Denisovans shared the M273V amino acid polymorphism in the ameloblastin gene with the sequenced Chinese Homo erectus individuals but not with Neanderthals. All 6 Chinese H. erectus individuals also carried the A253G mutation in the ameloblastin gene, which was unique to these individuals and not found in Denisovans or other extinct hominins. This was suggested by the authors to represent evidence that populations closely related to the sampled Chinese Homo erectus individuals interbred with Denisovans and passed onto them the M273V variant, but that these Chinese H. erectus individuals belonged to a distinct species and were not themselves members of or predominant direct ancestors of the Denisovan lineage. John Hawks expressed skepticism regarding the conclusions of the study, noting that the sampled remains were fragmentary (the remains from Zhoukoudian were of an isolated tooth, rather than the well known "Peking Man" remains, which had been lost in WW2) and of uncertain dating, meaning that direct morphological comparison to known Denisovan remains was limited, and that the limited genetic resolution provided by proteomic sequences was in his view not enough evidence to rule out that they were true members of the Denisovan lineage.

=== Modern humans ===
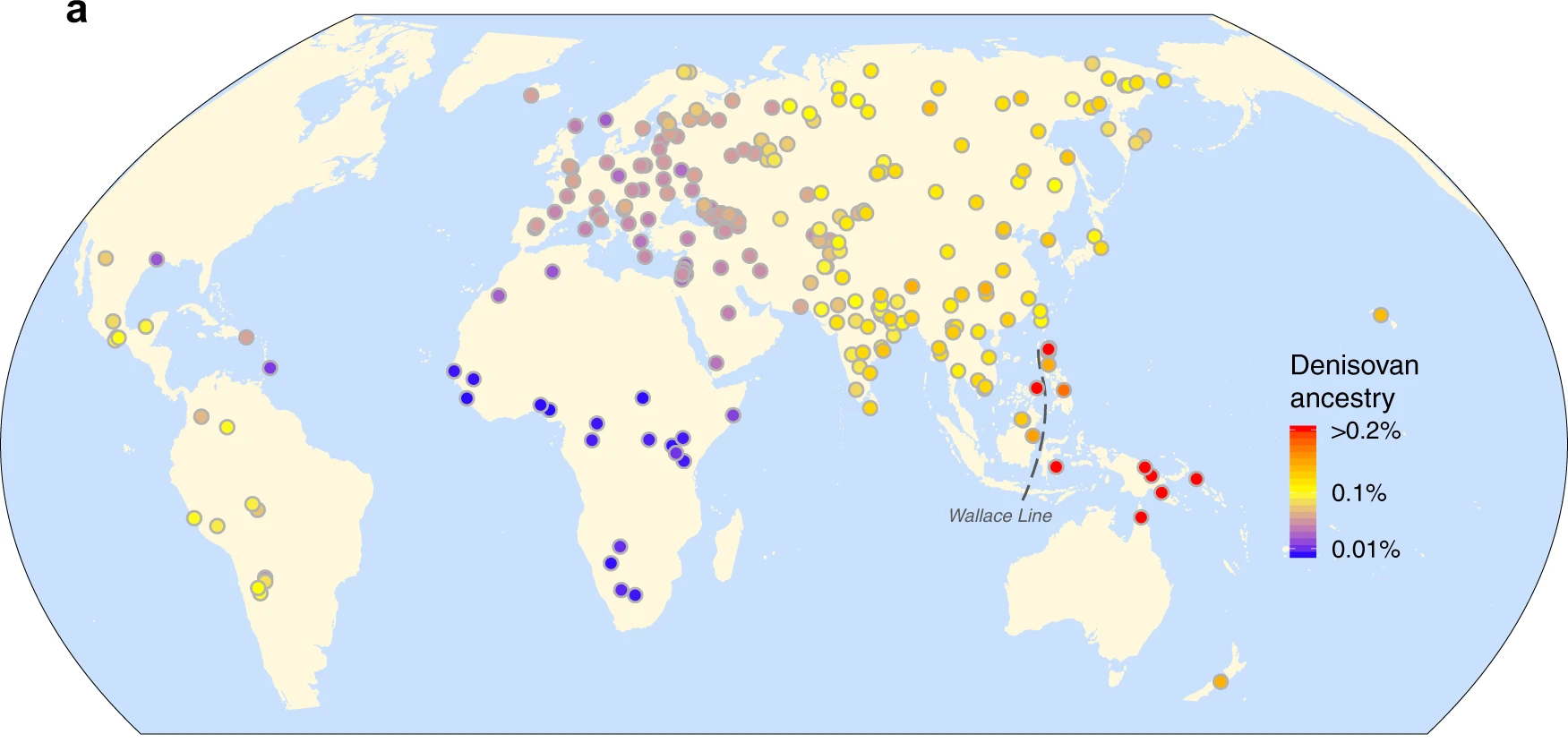
Archaic Denisovan introgression in modern humans across the world

A 2011 study found that Denisovan DNA is present at a comparatively high level in Papuans, Aboriginal Australians, Near Oceanians, Polynesians, Fijians, Eastern Indonesians, and Aeta (from the Philippines); but not in East Asians, western Indonesians, Jahai people (from Malaysia), or Onge (from the Andaman Islands). This may suggest that Denisovan introgression occurred within the Pacific region rather than on the Asian mainland, and that ancestors of the latter groups were not present in Southeast Asia at the time. In the Melanesian genome, about 4–6% or 1.9–3.4% derives from Denisovan introgression. Prior to 2021, New Guineans and Indigenous Australians were reported to have the most introgressed DNA, but Australians have less than New Guineans. A 2021 study discovered 30–40% more Denisovan ancestry in Aeta people in the Philippines than in Papuans, estimated as about 5% of the genome. The Aeta Magbukon in Luzon have the highest known proportion of Denisovan ancestry of any population in the world. In Papuans, less Denisovan ancestry is seen in the X chromosome than autosomes, and some autosomes (such as chromosome 11) also have less Denisovan ancestry, which could indicate hybrid incompatibility. The former observation could also be explained by less Denisovan introgression into modern humans, or by more female modern human immigrants who diluted Denisovan X-chromosome ancestry.

In contrast, 0.2% derives from Denisovan ancestry in mainland Asians and Native Americans. A 2018 study found that South Asians were found to have levels of Denisovan admixture similar to that seen in East Asians. Another study found that the highest Denisovan ancestry is inferred in Oceanians (~2.0%), while Americans, East Asians, and South Asians have similar amounts (~0.1%). The discovery of the 40,000-year-old Chinese modern human Tianyuan Man with similar levels of Denisovan ancestry to modern-day East Asians discounts the hypothesis that immigrating modern humans simply diluted Denisovan ancestry, whereas Melanesians lived in reproductive isolation. A 2018 study of Han Chinese, Japanese, and Dai genomes showed that modern East Asians have DNA from two different Denisovan populations: one similar to the Denisovan DNA found in Papuan genomes, and a second that is closer to the Denisovan genome from Denisova Cave. This could indicate two separate introgression events involving two different Denisovan populations. In South Asian genomes, DNA only came from the same single Denisovan introgression seen in Papuans. A 2019 study found a third wave of Denisovans that introgressed into East Asians. Introgression, also, may not have immediately occurred when modern humans immigrated into the region.

The timing of introgression into Oceanian populations likely occurred after Eurasians and Oceanians split roughly 50,000 years ago, and before Papuan and Aboriginal Australians split from each other roughly 37,000 years ago. Given the present-day distribution of Denisovan DNA, this may have taken place in Wallacea, though the discovery of a 7,200-year-old Toalean girl (closely related to Papuans and Aboriginal Australians) from Sulawesi carrying Denisovan DNA makes Sundaland another potential candidate. Other early Sunda hunter-gatherers so far sequenced carry very little Denisovan DNA, which either means the introgression event did not occur in Sundaland, or that Denisovan ancestry was diluted by gene flow from the mainland Asian Hòabìnhian culture and subsequent Neolithic cultures.

A haplotype of EPAS1 in modern Tibetans, which allows them to live at high elevations in a low-oxygen environment, likely came from Denisovans. Genes related to phospholipid transporters (which are involved in fat metabolism) and to trace amine-associated receptors (involved in smelling) are more active in people with more Denisovan ancestry. Denisovan genes may have conferred a degree of immunity against the G614 mutation of SARS-CoV-2. Denisovan introgressions may have influenced the immune system of present-day Papuans and potentially favoured "variants to immune-related phenotypes" and "adaptation to the local environment".

In December 2023, scientists reported that genes inherited by modern humans from Neanderthals and Denisovans may biologically influence the daily routine of modern humans.

In August 2025, a study reported an archaic haplotype of the MUC19 gene of Denisovan origin which occurs at high frequency in most admixed American populations, and which was also was found in ancient genomes from 23 ancient Indigenous American individuals who predate admixture with Europeans and Africans. This haplotype regulates MUC19 production, which is expressed in corneal and conjunctival epithelia, and the lacrimal gland and shows strong signs of positive selection in modern humans. This haplotype with Denisovan-specific variants is contained in a 72-kb region of the MUC19 gene, but that region is embedded in a larger 742-kb region that contains Neanderthal-specific variants. The authors also found that the Denisovan haplotype was also found in the Chagyrskaya and Vindija late Neanderthals, so the authors conclude that modern humans inherited this haplotype from Neanderthals, who likely inherited it from Denisovans through Denisovan admixture with Neanderthals.

A 2025 study of ancient and modern genomes from Eurasia traced the historical route of Denisovan admixture throughout Northern and Western Eurasia. It found that the highest Denisovan admixture was in the 40,000-year-old Tianyuan man from northeast China, the first example of the Ancestral East Asian population. The individuals from Sungir in Russia, dating to 34,000 years ago, also had Denisovan admixture. Tianyuan man contributed Denisovan DNA segments to the individual from Salkhit in Eastern Siberia, and later to the Ancient North Eurasians such as the Mal'ta boy from 24,000 years ago. The Ancient North Eurasians then became the ancestors of the Eastern hunter-gatherers who passed their Denisovan ancestry to the later Proto-Indo-European Yamnaya culture. Therefore, present-day Europeans and Near Easterners also have Denisovan ancestry. However, the study found that the Jōmon people of ancient Japan had much less Denisovan ancestry than all other East Asians.

== See also ==
- Red Deer Cave people – Prehistoric humans from 12,500 BCE in southwest China
- Homo naledi – South African archaic human species
- Nesher Ramla Homo – Extinct population of archaic humans
- Solo Man – Extinct subspecies of Homo erectus
- Timeline of human evolution
