= Jinniushan =

Paleoanthropological site in northeastern China

- 金牛山 (Chinese)
- Location within China
- 40°34′40″N 122°26′38″E
- Periods: Middle Pleistocene
- Location: Liaoning, China

Site notes
- Excavation dates: 1984

Jinniushan (Chinese: 金牛山) is a Middle Pleistocene paleoanthropological site, dating to around 260,000 years old, most famous for its archaic hominin fossil, Jinniushan human. The site is located near Yingkou, Liaoning, China. Several new species of extinct birds were also discovered at the site.

== Features ==
Jinniushan is as isolated mountain rising up to 70 meters above the sea level, located 8 km south of Dashiqiao in Yingkou County, Liaoning Province. It is variously known in English as "Golden Ox Mountain", "Gold Bull Mountain" or "Gold Ox Mount". It is 6 km south of Xiangxi, the oldest gold mine in Liaoning Province.

=== History ===
Mining for hark rocks started in the 1940s, and was considered a potential gold mine. In 1993, a hydroelectric dam was constructed which destroyed many of the mining sites. Formal permit for gold mining was acquired by Yuanling Minco company in 2006. The Jinniushan Joint Excavation Team unearthed several mammalian fossils in 1976. The first formal paleotological explorations was conducted by Lü Zuné (呂遵諤) from the Department of Archaeology of the Peking University in September 1984. Lü and his team discovered pieces of human bones from a collapsed limestone cave at the foot of the mountain. The bones were later identified in 2006 as that of a woman, who showed mixed features of Homo sapiens (modern humans) and H. erectus and lived around 260,000 years ago.

== Jinniushan human ==
The hominid fossils at Jinniushan all belong to one individual. Initially, the fossils were believed to have belonged to a male specimen, since the fossils were so big. Later analysis shows that the fossil remains actually come from a female specimen.

=== Size ===
The Jinniushan specimen's body mass is estimated to be around 78.6 kg (173 lb), making it the largest female specimen ever discovered in the fossil record. The next largest female specimen ever discovered, found at Grotte du Prince, early Late Pleistocene, from around 100,000 BP, has an estimated body mass of 74 kg (163 lb).

Body size in Homo reached its maximum during the Middle Pleistocene, so the size of the Jinniushan specimen is not surprising, especially since the specimen was found at a high latitude, cold climate location. In accordance with Allen's rule and Bergmann's rule, the large body, wide trunk, and short limbs of the Jinniushan female is to be expected, as the hominins from that time relied more on their physical body as a cold adaptation, as their technological culture was not yet as advanced as later hominins.

=== Description ===

The fossil elements at Jinniushan all belong to one female individual. The fossil remains consist of one cranium, six vertebrae (one cervical, five thoracic), one complete left os coxae, one complete left ulna, one complete left patella, two left ribs, and several hand and feet bones. The Jinniushan specimen's estimated cranial capacity is 1,330 cm^{3} (81 cu in). The encephalization quotient (EQ) is estimated to be around 4.150. Both are typical of the rapidly increasing brain capacity and EQ found in other specimens from the Middle Pleistocene.

=== Comparison ===
Recent human family tree

- - Neanderthals
  - - - Homo antecessor
      - - Jinniushan
        - - Hualong
          - - Dali
            - - Xiahe
              - Harbin
    - Modern humans

According to Ni et al. 2021 (note, Xiahe and Denisovans are most closely related to Neanderthals according to nDNA and ancient protein analyses by Chen et al. 2019.)

The Jinniushan specimen belongs to an archaic human with mixed Homo erectus and Homo sapiens features.

The Jinniushan specimen is similar to the Dali specimen, but more gracile, which can be explained by sexual dimorphism. The cranial vault and supraorbitals of the Jinniushan specimen are thinner than those of the Dali specimen. Jinniushan's external cranium is the same size as Dali's, but Jinniushan's bones are thinner, so the Jinniushan specimen has a larger brain capacity than the Dali specimen.

Both specimens have flat and broad faces, a feature shared with the specimen from Hulu Cave, Nanjing; both also share some features with the Zhoukoudian and Yunxian specimens.

Morphologically, archaic female and Neanderthal females are more similar to modern females than their male counterparts are to modern males. The similar morphologies imply that the birth mechanics of the Jinniushan hominin is probably similar to that of modern females.

== Fauna ==
Fossils of the extinct macaque Macaca robustus, large beaver Trogontherium, deer Sinomegaceros pachyosteus, rhinoceros Stephanorhinus kirchbergensis, and the vole Microtus brandtioides fossils were found at Jinniushan. Several new species of extinct birds were also discovered, including Aegypius jinniushanensis and Leptoptilos lüi.

In 2021, Liu Jinyi and colleagues reported a discovery of extinct hyena from Jinniushan. It is the largest ever short-faced hyena skull discovered. The species belonging to Pachycrocuta brevirostris, which was earlier believed to be endemic to Europe.

== Bibliography ==
- Rosenberg, Karen R.; Lü, Zuné; Ruff, Christopher B. (Mar 7, 2006). "Body size, body proportions, and encephalization in a Middle Pleistocene archaic human from northern China". PNAS. 103 (10): 3552–3556. Bibcode:2006PNAS..103.3552R. doi:10.1073/pnas.0508681103. PMC 1450121. PMID 16505378.
- Rosenberg, Karen R.; Wu, Xinzhi (2013). "Chapter 3: A River Runs through It: Modern Human Origins in East Asia". In Smith, Fred H. (ed.). The Origins of Modern Humans Biology Reconsidered (2 ed.). Wiley. pp. 89–121. ISBN 978-0-470-89409-5.
- Rosenberg, Karen R. (1998). "Chapter 23: Morphological Variation in West Asian Postcrania: Implications for Obstetric and Locomotor Behavior". In Akazawa, Takeru (ed.). Neandertals and Modern Humans in Western Asia. Plenum Publishers. pp. 367–379. ISBN 0-306-45924-8.
- Zhang, Zihui; Huang, Yunping; James, Helen F.; Hou, Lianhai (2012a). "A Marabou (Ciconiidae: Leptoptilos) from the Middle Pleistocene of Northeastern China". The Auk. 129 (4): 699–706. doi:10.1525/auk.2012.11227. S2CID 55170353.
- Zhang, Zihui; Huang, Yunping; James, Helen F.; Hou, Lianhai (2012b). "Two Old World vultures from the middle Pleistocene of northeastern China and their implications for interspecific competition and biogeography of Aegypiinae". Journal of Vertebrate Paleontology. 32 (1): 117–124. doi:10.1080/02724634.2012.624146. S2CID 85765495.
