= Hualongdong people =

Extinct humans that lived in eastern China around 300,000 years ago

Hualongdong People
- Common name: Hualongdong People
- Species: uncertain Archaic Human
- Age: Middle Pleistocene, 300,000 years ago
- Place discovered: Hualong Cave, Dongzhi County, China
- Date discovered: 2006
- Discovered by: Xiujie Wu and Liu Wu

The Hualongdong people are extinct humans that lived in eastern China around 300,000 years ago during the late Middle Pleistocene. Discovered by a research team led by Xiujie Wu and Liu Wu, of the Chinese Academy of Sciences, from the Hualong Cave (pinyin: huálóng dòng; lit.'flowery/elegant dragon cave') in Dongzhi County at Anhui Province in 2006, they are known from about 30 fossils that belong to 16 individuals. The first analysis of the skull fragments collected in 2006 suggested that they could be members of Homo erectus. For some of the specimens, their exact position as a human species is not known. More complete fossils found in 2015 indicate that they cannot be directly assigned to any Homo species as they also exhibit archaic human features. They are the first humans in Asia to have both archaic and modern human features. They are likely a distinct species that form a separate branch in the human family tree.

== Discovery ==
Chen Shengqian and Luo Hu, historical investigators in Dongzhi County, found the Hualong Cave in 2004, or 2005. With the help of palaeontologists from the Chinese Academy of Sciences, led by Xiujie Wu and Liu Wu, they discovered the cave as a palaeontological site in 2006. Initial excavation yielded human remains comprising a single tooth (lower second molar), designated specimen HLD (for Hualongdong) 1, and two pieces of a skull bone (frontal fragments) from one individual, labelled HLD 2.

A series of excavations was organised between 2014 and 2016 by which many animal fossils and stone tools were discovered. In addition, 29 human remains were found that came from about 16 individuals. The best specimen is an individual, coded HLD 6, represented by 11 fossil pieces of the skull, teeth and jaw bones. A temporal bone was the first piece found in 2014, and the rest, in 2015. Radiometric dating in 2019 established that the fossils are about 300,000 years old.

== Homo erectus ==
Two of the first human remains found in 2006 are a lower second molar (HLD 1) and skull bones (HLD 2). The two pieces of frontal bones perfectly fit to each other at one end, indicating that they were from one individual. They show small curvature with prominent temporal line and thick cranial wall like those of H. erectus. The structure and size of the tooth are also within the general features of H. erectus.

In 2015, Liu Wu announced the discovery of one of the most complete and best preserved human skulls from Hualong Cave. Popularised as "Dongzhi Man", the fossil was identified as H. erectus.

== HLD 11 ==
A femoral bone, HLD 11, was discovered in 2015 and analysed in 2020, along with smaller pieces, HLD 15 and 16. It consists of a midshaft section that is 42 mm long with intact circumference. The structure indicates it as part of the right thigh. It most resembles that of Zhoukoudian Peking Man (H. erectus), but the exact identity is unclear as it also shares features of archaic humans of the Middle to early Late Pleistocene of Europe.

== HLD 6 ==
HLD 6, represented by 11 fossil parts belong to a single individual, is the most complete human remains in Hualong Cave. Based on the teeth development, the individual was initially estimated in 2019 as between 13 and 15 years old, but revised in 2023 to 12–13 years old.

In 2019, the skull and teeth were analysed that established the individual had a mixed feature of both archaic and modern humans. It possesses several common features with Asian archaic humans including a low and wide skull cup and nostril, as well as reduced or absent third molars. However, in contrast to other archaic humans, HLD 6 also shows features of modern humans such as flat face, chin and modern-like teeth. Report of the analysis of the facial skeleton in 2021 upheld that the flat face, poor prognathism, and nose bones are suggestive of a blend of archaic and modern human features.

In 2020, a well preserved lower jawbone (mandible) was discovered among animal fossils that was found to be part of HLD 6. The analysis, reported in 2023, revealed that the individual shows a clear mixture of different archaic and modern humans. A thick bone along the jawline is a common feature with H. erectus. A notable archaic appearance is the lack of true chin. A true chin a defining feature of modern humans and is absent in archaic species. HLD 6 jawline is more similar to those of Denisovans than to any other humans. However, the thin wall of the jawbone is a shared featured with modern humans. Comparison with Peking Man, Neanderthals and Denisovans indicate that they cannot fit into any of the known human species, and may be a hybrid species. The study states "that the HLD 6 mandible exhibits a mosaic pattern with some features commonly found in Middle Pleistocene archaic hominins, Late Pleistocene anatomically modern humans, and recent modern humans."
