= Hualong Cave =

Cave in Anhui, China

- Hualongdong
- Interactive map of Hualong Cave
- Location: Dongzhi County, Anhui, People's Republic of China
- Coordinates: 30°03′48″N 116°33′55″E
- Depth: 3.1–4.8 m
- Length: 93 m

Hualong Cave (simplified Chinese: 华龙洞; traditional Chinese: 華龍洞; pinyin: huálóng dòng; lit. 'flowery/elegant dragon cave') is a cave in Pangwang village in Dongzhi County, Anhui Province, China, and situated on the southern bank of Yangtze. It is located on the side of Meiyuan Hill. Palaeontological interest started in 2004 when a farmer accidentally found bones that were later identified as mammalian fossils. Excavations started in 2006 by paleontologists from the Chinese Academy of Sciences. It has yielded many stone tools and over 30 human fossils, and animal bones including those of Ailuropoda, Arctonyx, Bubalus, Sinomegaceros, Stegodon, giant tapir, and giant pandas. The most notable fossils are those of the Hualongdong people, including Homo erectus (dubbed Dongzhi Man) described in 2014, and that of a 300,000-year-old archaic human discovered in 2019.

== Stone tool ==
Hualong Cave shows the lifestyle of humans in the Paleolithic Age. Bone tools were used for cutting animals but not for hunting. More than 100 stone tools have been discovered. These stone tools were made from siliceous rocks. Scrapers were the most abundant tools.

== Animal fossil ==
More than 40 species of mammalian fossils have been discovered from Hualong Cave. The majority of them are even-toed ungulates. Only few rodents can be identified. Important specimens include Ailuropoda, Arctonyx, Bubalus, Sinomegaceros, stegodon, giant tapir, and giant pandas. The occurrence of Sinomegaceros in the cave is remarked as the most southern in China.

== Human fossil ==
=== Dongzhi Man ===
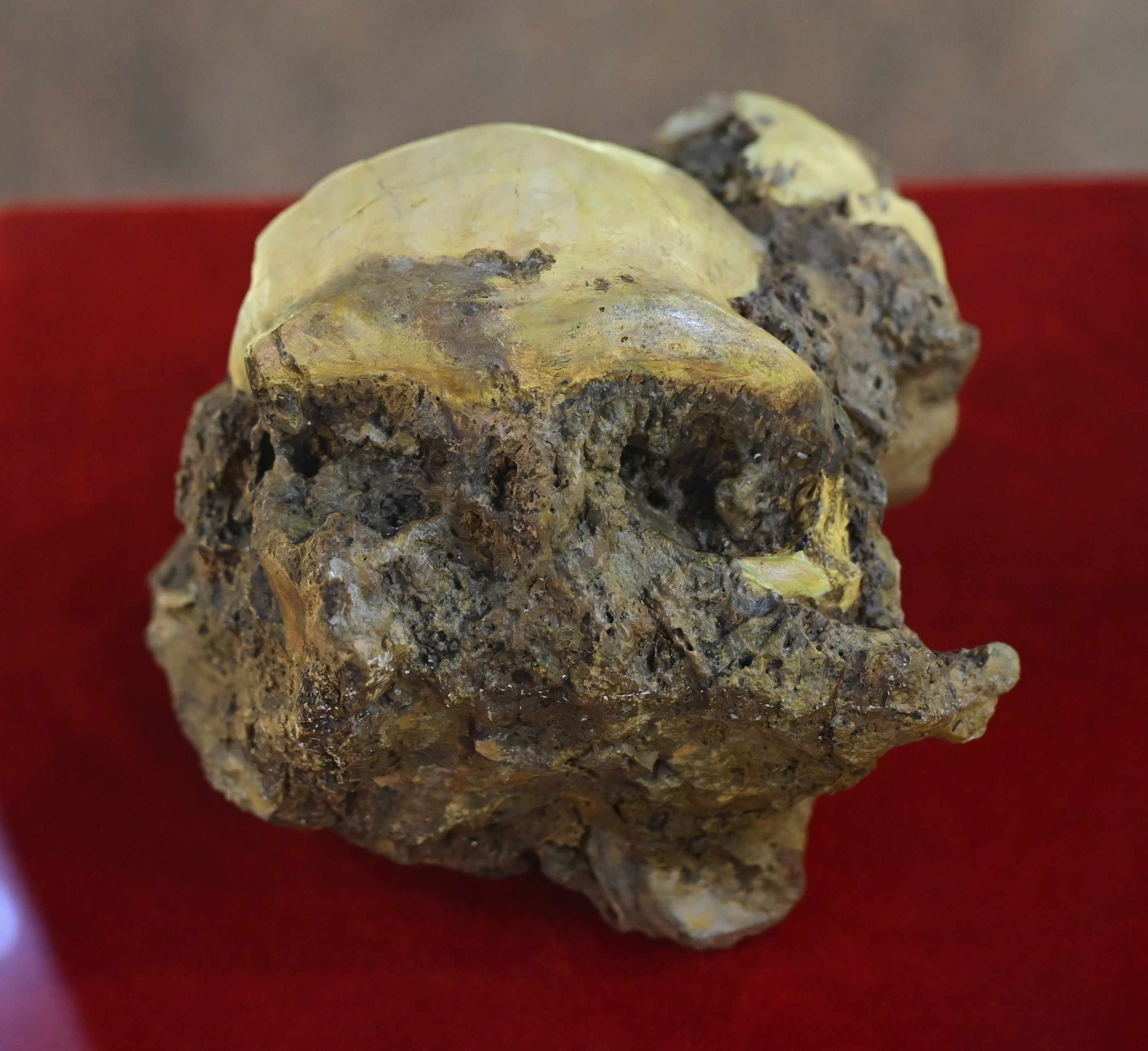
Skull cast of Dongzhi Man, Paleozoological Museum of China

Popularized as Dongzhi Man, a human fossil described in 2014 from Hualong Cave is considered as among the most well-preserved Homo erectus specimens. It was discovered in 2006 along with stone artifacts and animal fossils during the first excavation. It consisted of two skull fragments and one separated (lower molar) teeth. The skull fragments were believed to be from the same individual. It is different from other fossils of the same species including Peking Man found in China. The teeth surfaces (enamel-dentine junctions) are much simpler and the cusps are sharper.

=== Other Fossils ===
Recent human family tree

- - Neanderthals
  - - - Homo antecessor
      - - Jinniushan
        - - Dongzhi man
          - - Dali
            - - Xiahe
              - Harbin
    - Modern humans

According to Ni et al. 2021 (note, Xiahe and Denisovans are most closely related to Neanderthals according to nDNA and ancient protein analyses by Chen et al. 2019.)

In 2019 a discovery of 16 human fossils was announced which were estimated to be about 300,000 (275,000–331,000) years old. The fossil assemblage included 8 cranial elements, seven isolated teeth, three femoral diaphyseal pieces, and major portions of an adolescent skull (designated HLD 6, HLD for Hualongdong).
