= Dali Man =

Hominin fossil

Coordinates: 34°52′N 109°44′E

Dali Skull
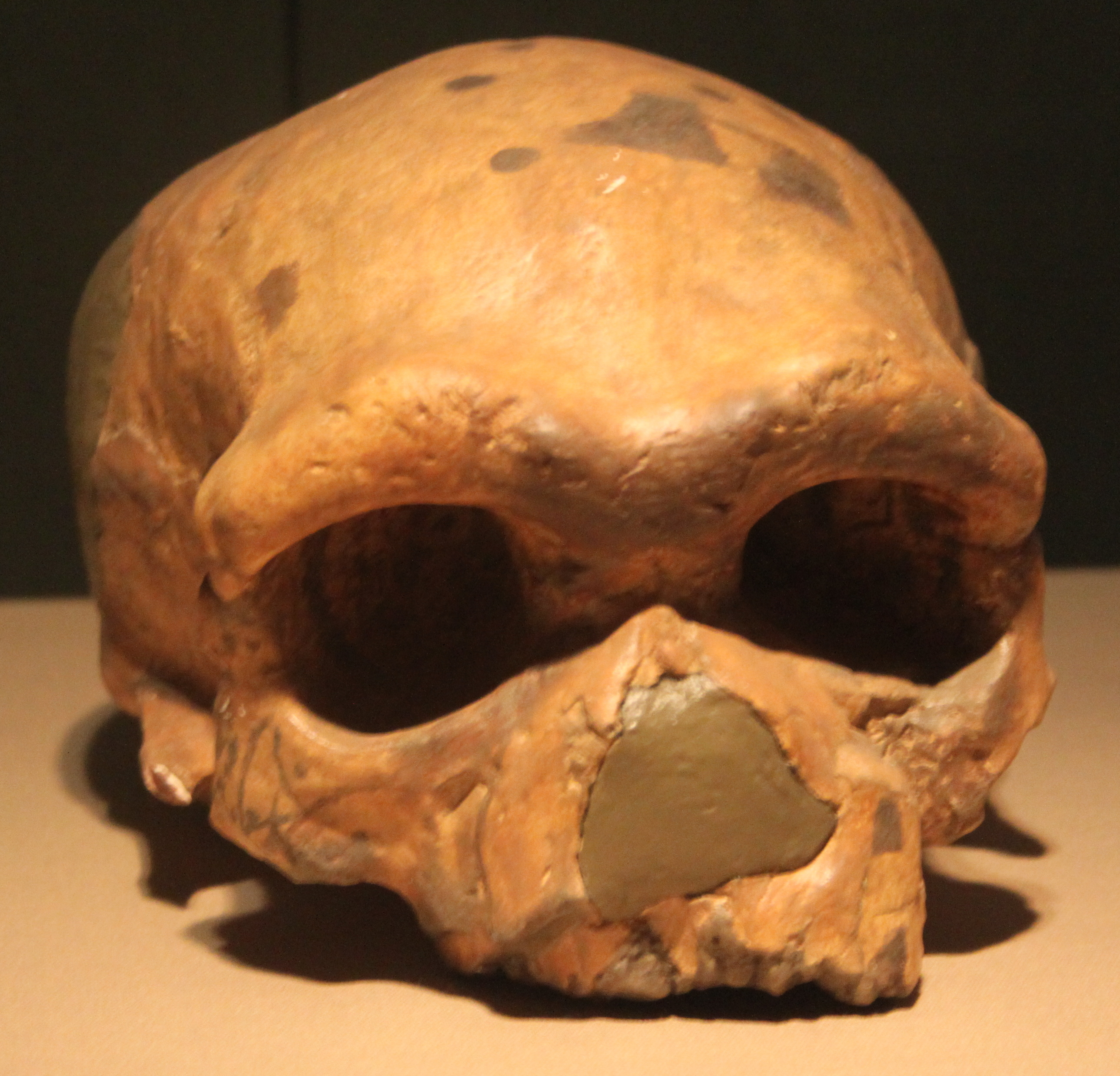
- Common name: Dali Skull
- Species: late Homo erectus, Homo heidelbergensis, or archaic Homo sapiens
- Age: 260±20 ka
- Place discovered: Dali County, Shaanxi, China
- Date discovered: 1978
- Discovered by: Liu Shuntang

Dali man (Chinese: 大荔人) is the name given to a largely complete fossilized skull of an archaic human who lived during the Middle Pleistocene epoch. It was discovered by Liu Shuntang in 1978 in Dali County, Shaanxi Province, China.

Dating the skull is a matter of debate. While uranium-series dating of ox teeth from the same site in 1994 obtained a date of 209±23 ka, it is unclear whether the hominid cranium and the ox teeth date from a similar era. A new analysis performed in 2017 used a variety of methods, arriving at an age estimate of about 260±20 ka. The fossil is considered to be the most complete skull of that time period found in China.

Access to Dali Man is restricted. The cranium is currently housed in the Institute of Vertebrate Paleontology and Paleoanthropology in Beijing, China.

== Characteristics of the skull ==
The Dali cranium is interesting to modern anthropologists as it is possibly a well-preserved example of archaic Homo sapiens; it has a mixture of traits from Homo erectus and Homo sapiens. However, the details of the face and skull are distinct from European Neanderthals and earlier European hominids, such as remains found in Petralona cave and Atapuerca.

=== Vault ===
The skull is low and long, though the posterior end of the skull is rounded, unlike the contemporary broad-based H. erectus or top-wide skull of modern humans. It does however bear a prominent sagittal keel, a trait found in H. erectus but in few modern humans. The brain appears to have been sitting mainly behind the face, giving an extremely low forehead. The cranial capacity is estimated to around 1 120 cc, at the lower end of the modern human range, and upper end of the H. erectus range. The base of the cranium is less robust than in H. erectus. The posterior margin lacks the heavy neck muscle attachment seen in that group. Unlike the distinct tubular form seen in H. erectus, the tympanic plate is thin and foreshortened, a condition similar to that of modern humans.

Unlike H. erectus skulls, the Dali skull lacks the "pinched" look between the face and the cranial vault.

=== Face ===
The face is topped by massive brow ridges. The ridges curve over each eye, unlike the straight bar-like ridges seen at the Peking man material from Zhoukoudian. The curvature is more similar structurally to the brow ridges in archaic humans from Europe and Africa. The cheek bones are delicate, and the nasal bone flattened, again a curious combination of traits. During fossilization, the upper jaw has been fractured and dislocated upwards, giving the cranium the appearance of having a very short face. If reconstructed, the face would be probably be similar in overall dimensions to that of the Jinniushan woman skull.

== Taxonomy ==
A proposed recent human family tree

- - Neanderthals
  - - - Homo antecessor
      - - Jinniushan
        - - Hualong
          - - Dali
            - - Xiahe
              - Harbin
    - Modern humans

According to Ni et al. 2021 (note, Xiahe and Denisovans are most closely related to Neanderthals according to nDNA and ancient protein analyses by Chen et al. 2019.)

In March 1978, a surprisingly complete archaic human skull was unearthed by local geologist Liu Shuntang in Dali County, Shaanxi in north-central China. It was formally described the following year by Chinese palaeoanthropologists Wang Yongyan and colleagues, who preliminarily characterised it as a late Middle Pleistocene transitional morph between Homo erectus (more specifically, the Chinese Peking Man) and the European Neanderthals. In 1981, Wu Xinzhi produced a much more substantial description of the specimen, and instead concluded it is a transitional morph between H. erectus and modern humans, coining the name "Homo sapiens daliensis". At this point in time, the Out of Africa hypothesis (that humans evolved in and dispersed out of Africa) was overturning the Out of Asia and multiregional hypotheses. In Western thought, Peking Man moved from the centre of human origins to a dead offshoot, while Chinese palaeoanthropologists repurposed the multiregional hypothesis wherein local archaic populations interbred with the ancestors of modern humans, thereby still being maintained as human ancestors. At this point, multiregional debates were accompanied by (occasionally racist) anatomical continuities between East Asian archaic and modern East Asian and Oceanian peoples. Wu grouped Dali Man with all late Middle Pleistocene skulls, including skulls from Dingcun, Jinniushan, and Yunxian, though he promptly deserted the nomen "H. s. daliensis". Thus, these specimens were often simply referred to as just "archaic H. sapiens".

The 2010 sequencing of the genetic code of an unidentified human species from Denisova Cave, Siberia, propagated suppositions that the Dali Man and East Asian contemporaries represent these enigmatic "Denisovans", but this is impossible to confirm as Denisovans are only identifiable from DNA instead of any diagnostic anatomical features.

At around this time, the nomen Homo heidelbergensis was regaining popularity, being largely assigned to various Middle Pleistocene African and European specimens. Some authors additionally lumped contemporary East Asian remains into it, including Dali, first suggested by anthropologists Aurélien Mounier, Silvana Condemi, and Giorgio Manzi in 2011. In 2016, Manzi recommended resurrecting Wu's nomen as "H. heidelbergensis daliensis" for Middle Pleistocene East Asian specimens. However according to a 2023 assessment, since Wu wrote only that "it is suggested that Dali cranium probably represents a new subspecies" (p. 538, italics added for emphasis) the name daliensis was never validly published according to International Commission on Zoological Nomenclature (ICZN) rules, being proposed conditionally and published after 1960 (and not formally proposed by subsequent workers in the intervening period), and is therefore unavailable. Reed (2025) noted the discrepancy of the 1981 article body and abstract in its specific name proposal, since the term used in the article body suggests a conditional proposal as noted in ICZN article 15, while the article abstract seems to suggest a more definitive proposal; for consistency, he stated that applying the ICZN code for the entirety of the publication renders H. daliensis an unavailable, conditionally proposed name.

In 2021, Chinese paleoanthropologist Qiang Ji and colleagues described a new species, Homo longi, based on a late Middle Pleistocene skull from Harbin in northeastern China. They suggested Denisovans may belong to H. longi, but excluded Dali Man and contemporaneous East Asian specimens. They instead recommended reviving H. daliensis to accommodate these specimens. In a study published the same day, Israeli anthropologist Israel Hershkovitz and colleagues suggested the apparent diversity of supposedly unique forms during the Middle Pleistocene is the result of a complex network of cross-continental interbreeding, based on the 140 to 120 thousand years old Israeli Nesher Ramla remains which feature a mix of Neanderthal and H. erectus traits.

== Other possible Dali-type finds ==
An assortment of primitive Homo skulls have tentatively been placed with the Dali find. The Maba Man, a 120 to 140 000 year old fragmentary skull from Guangdong in China shows the same general contours of the forehead. A partial female skeleton with skull from Jinniushan (also China) seems to belong to the same group, characterized by a very robust skull cap but less robust skull base. A possibly fourth member could be the Narmada skull from the Madhya Pradesh in India, consisting of a single robust cranial vault.

The Denisova hominin, represented originally by a very robust finger bone found in the Altai mountains in Russia, and to which especially the find of a partial mandible in the Baishiya Karst Cave on the Tibetan Plateau in China was later added, are still in discussion if they might be linked to the Dali people (see Denisovan §Specimens). DNA studies show the Denisovans with Mitochondrial DNA linking them to a very deep split in the human tree. This would make the DNA erectus rather than heidelbergensis or other more recent splits. However, the analysis of the nuclear DNA points to a sister group relationship with the neanderthals. Thus, it is possible that the archaic humans in Asia were a mixture of neanderthal relatives and an already widespread Asian erectus population.

== See also ==
- List of human evolution fossils
- Dragon Man (archaic human)
