= Yunxian Man =

Hominid skull fossil from Yunxian, China

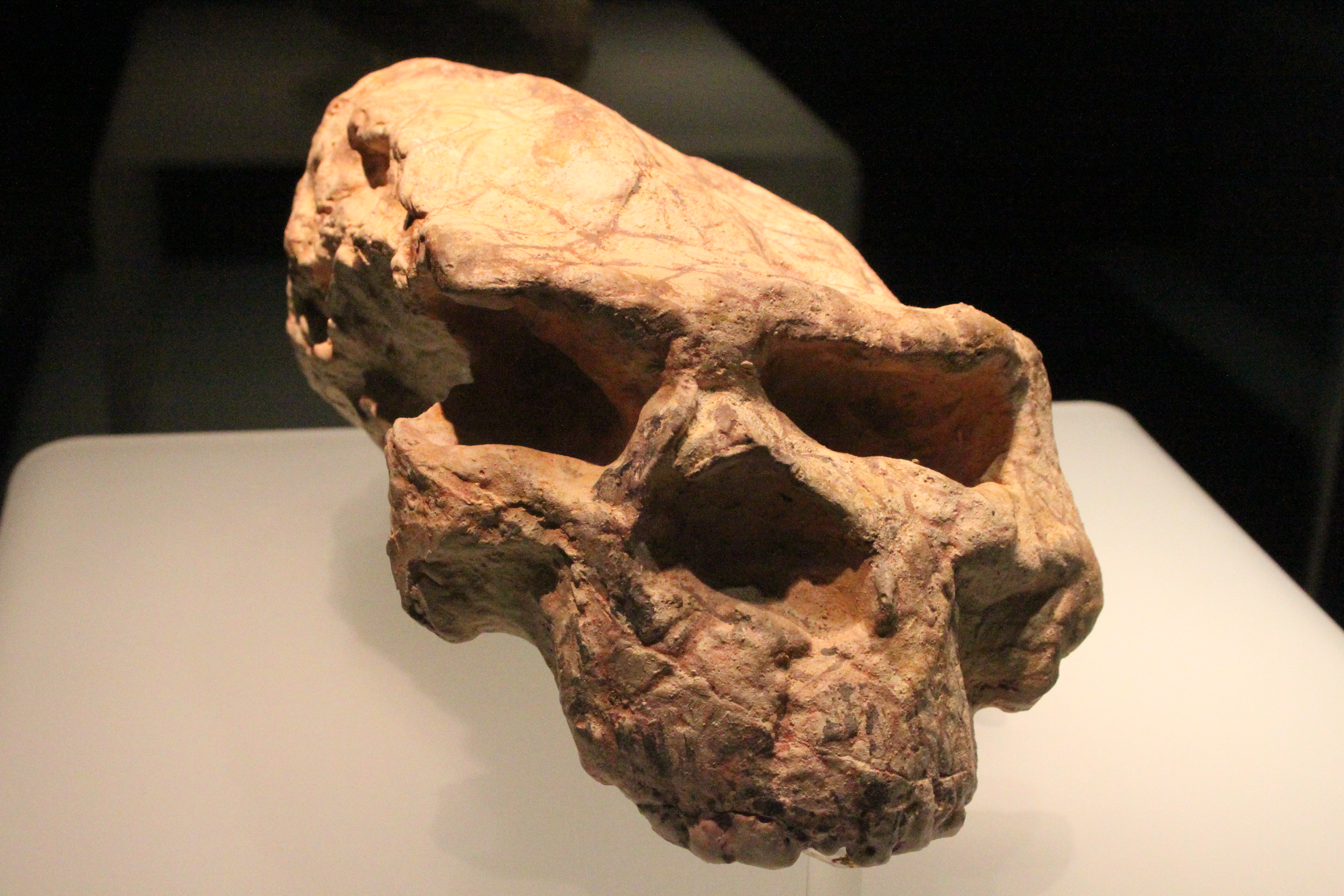
Yunxian 1 in the Hubei Provincial Museum, showing skull deformation

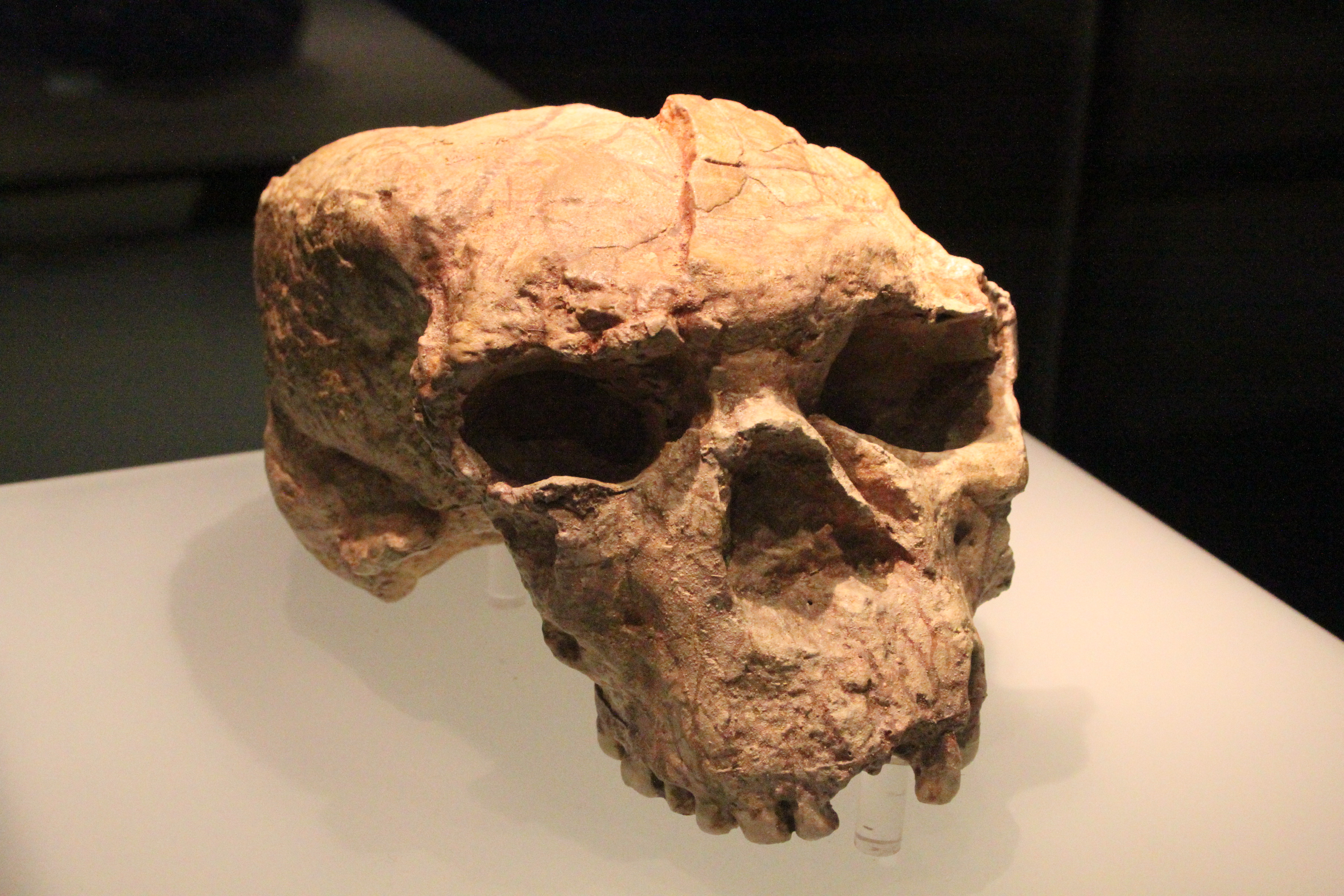
Yunxian 2 in the Hubei Provincial Museum

Yunxian Man (Chinese: 郧县人; pinyin: Yúnxiàn rén) is a set of three hominid skull fossils discovered at the Xuetangliangzi site (学堂梁子遗址; Xuétángliángzǐ Yízhǐ) in Yunyang district, Hubei, China. Two skulls were discovered, in 1989 and 1990, followed by a third in 2022. The first two were described as "crushed and distorted," but "relatively complete," and compared to Homo erectus or early Homo sapiens. These were given collection numbers EV 9001 and EV 9002 and are sometimes referred to as "Yunxian 1" and "Yunxian 2". The fossils were excavated by the Institute for Cultural Objects and Archeology of Hubei Province, the Yunyang Regional Museum (now the Shiyan City Museum), and the Yun District Museum.

In June 2001, the State Council designated the Xuetangliangzi site as a major cultural heritage site under national-level protection, as part of the fifth batch of additions to the list.

In late 2022, a third skull, 35 meters from the discovery site of the two original skulls, was discovered and designated "Yunxian 3"., and was discovered "in good condition."

The Xuetangliangzi paleontological site is at the mouth of the Quyuan River (曲远河; Qūyuǎn Hé), where it flows into the Han River, so it has also been called the Quyuan River site.

In 2025, a reconstruction removing much of the distortion led a team of researchers to believe the fossils are ancestral relatives of Denisovans.

== Scholarly analysis ==
The first two skulls bear similarities to Dali Man, but are significantly older. Adjacent animal fossils allowed their age to be narrowed down to 600,000 to 400,000 years before present. Some sources have described the specimens as Homo erectus, including a 3D virtual imaging analysis in 2010. However, scholars are still divided, with some suggesting that it could be a more modern species or a mix with Homo sapiens.

The paleoanthropologist Chris Stringer has suggested that Yunxian Man could be Homo heidelbergensis, which may thus have originated in Asia, though Chinese scholars dispute this classification. In 2012, Stringer speculated that Yunxian Man could be a Denisovan ancestor. In a 2016 article in Scientific American, Stringer called for better access to Chinese fossil specimens such as Yunxian Man and Dali Man, such as by replicas or CT scans. In 2025, a team co-led by Stringer created a reconstruction of Yunxian 2 removing much of the deformation, which led them to conclude that it was an early relative of the Denisovans; more closely related to them than it was to other known members of Homo.

Soon after Stringer and his colleagues published this reconstruction, another paper was published on which redated the skulls. Hau Tu and colleagues used isochron ^{26}AI/^{10}Be burial dating on quartz gravels from the surrounding sediment layers and obtained an age of ~1.77 million years. If this is the case, the claim that the Yunxian crania represent an early member of the Denisovan lineage may be inaccurate as it would require that lineage to have split by almost 1.8 million years ago, which is far earlier than any other archaic hominin group.
