= Xujiayao =

Prehistoric site in northern China

- Location within Shanxi Location within China
- 40°06′02″N 113°58′39″E
- Periods: early Late Pleistocene
- Location: Hebei and Shanxi, China
- Region: Nihewan Basin

Site notes
- Excavation dates: 1976, 1977, 1979, 2007, 2008

Xujiayao, located in the Nihewan Basin in China, is a late Middle Pleistocene (228,000–138,000 years ago) paleoanthropological site famous for its archaic hominin fossils.

== Discovery ==
Xujiayao is located on the west bank of the Liyi River, a tributary of the Sanggan River, consisting of two sites: Locality 73113 and Locality 74093. Locality 73113 is located near Xujiayao village in Yanggao County, Shanxi, while Locality 74093 is located near Houjiayao village in Yangyuan County, Hebei. Most of the fossils and artefacts were found at Locality 74093. The Institute of Vertebrate Paleontology and Paleoanthropology (IVPP) first discovered Xujiayao in 1974, and carried out excavations between 1976 and 1979. Later excavations, in 2007 and 2008, are carried out by the Hebei Provincial Institute of Cultural Relics. The lower and upper layers of Locality 74093 are both dated to the late Middle Pleistocene based on Electron Spin Resonance/Uranium series dating, approximately 228,000–205,000 years ago and 199,000–138,000 years ago, respectively. The hominin fossils are known from the upper layer of Locality 74093.

== Fauna ==
Around 5000 specimens from twenty-one distinct species of animals are known from the Xujiayao fossil assemblage of Locality 74093. The mammals include the wolf, Przewalski's horse, onager, woolly rhinoceros, spiral horned antelope Spirocerus, red deer, sika deer, goitered gazelle, Przewalski's gazelle, Sinomegaceros, aurochs, Chinese zokor and Brandt's vole. Fossils comparable to Palaeoloxodon naumanni and tiger, as well as indeterminate species of Sus, Struthio, pika and gazelle are also known.

=== Xujiayao hominin ===
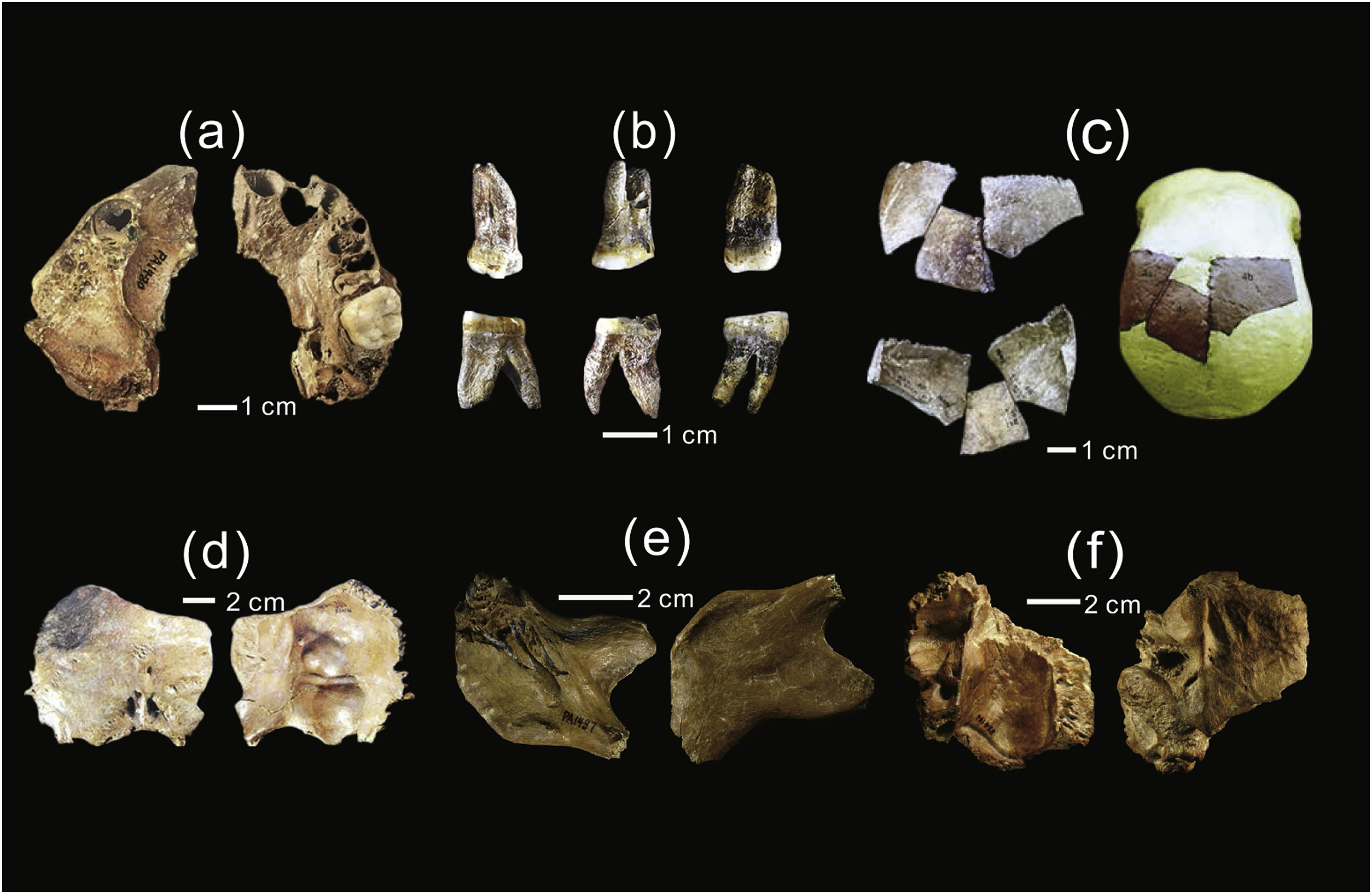
The Xujiayao hominin

Twenty hominid fossils were discovered from Locality 74093 of the Xujiayao site, consisting of 12 parietal bones, 1 temporal bone, 2 occipital bones, 1 mandibular bone fragment, 1 juvenile maxilla, and 3 isolated teeth. These specimens are assessed to be from 16 individuals. In 2024, Xiujie Wu & Christopher J. Bae designated the Xujiayao hominin fossils as the holotype of the species Homo juluensis, meaning "large-headed people" in Chinese. In 2026, Song Xing and colleagues performed proteomic analysis of two fragments from the Xujiayao fossil assemblage and identified that they are consistent with Denisovans' proteomes.

The Xujiayao skulls have a thick cranial vault, similar in thickness to that of Homo erectus pekinensis. The maxilla is more similar in shape to those of modern Homo sapiens. One of the Xujiayao hominin fossils, Xujiayao 11, is the oldest known hominin fossil to have an enlarged parietal foramen (a hole in the skull), an extremely rare abnormality found in less than 1 out of 25,000 cases in modern humans. Dental analysis shows that the Xujiayao hominin appears to retain many archaic features found in hominin fossils, such as Homo pekinensis, from the Early and Middle Pleistocene in East Asia, share more similarities with these earlier East Asian hominins, and share some similarities with Neanderthals. The inner ear arrangement in Xujiayao 15 was similar to those of Neanderthal inner ears.

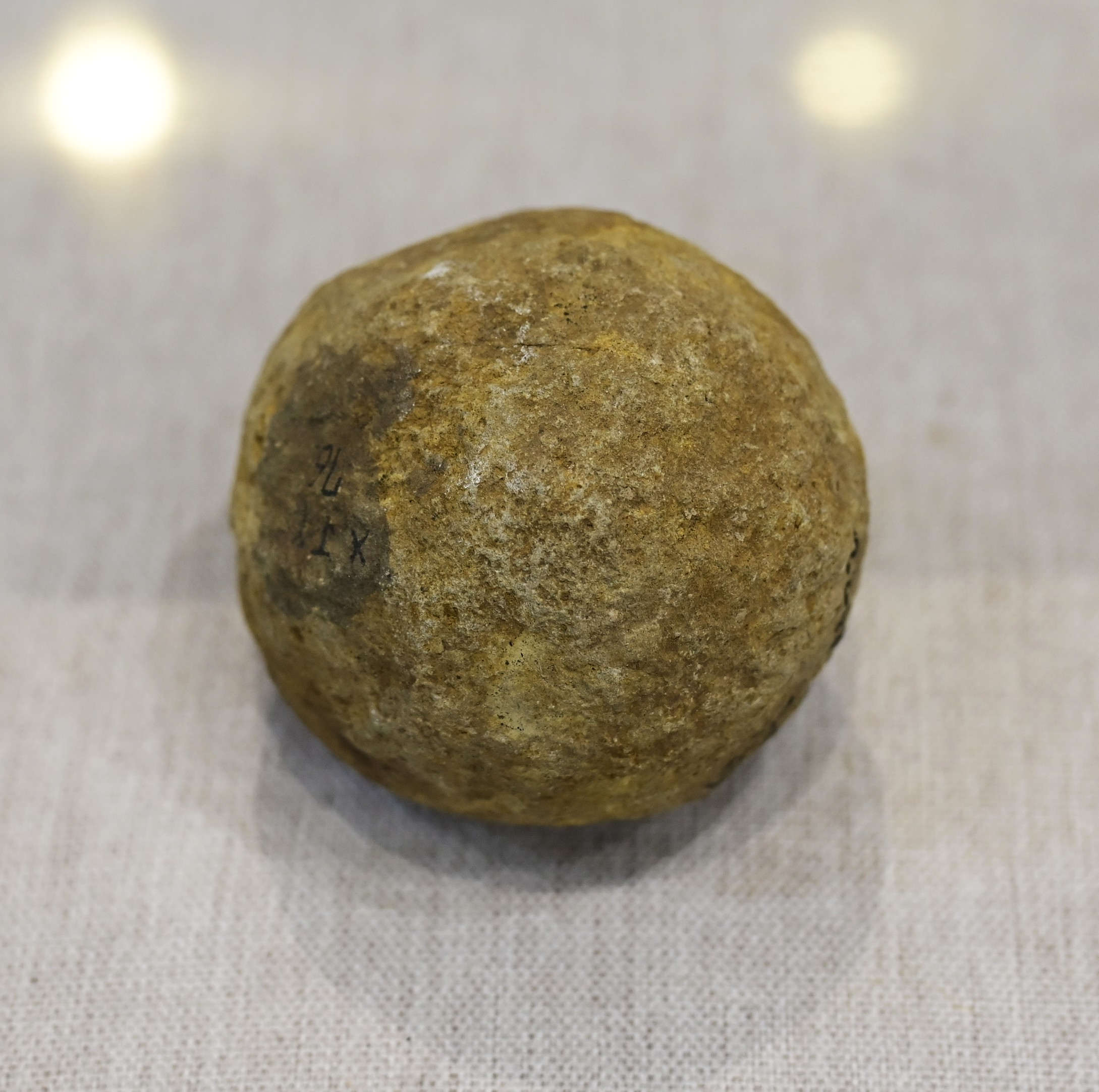
Stone ball from Xujiayao, Paleozoological Museum of China

Almost 30,000 lithic, bone and antler artefacts were also unearthed at Xujiayao. Tools found at Xujiayao include scrapers, points, gravers, anvils, chopper and spheroids. Over 50% of the artefacts consist of finished tools. Over 40% of the artefacts consist of scrapers. The artefacts there include the presence of over 1000 stone spheroids, the most of any Paleolithic site in China.

== Bibliography ==
- Norton, Christopher J.; Gao, Xing (2008). "Hominin–carnivore interactions during the Chinese Early Paleolithic: Taphonomic perspectives from Xujiayao". Journal of Human Evolution. 55 (1): 164–178. doi:10.1016/j.jhevol.2008.02.006. ISSN 0047-2484. PMID 18387651.
- Olsen, John W. (Nov 11, 2013). "Chapter 9: Recent Developments in the Upper Pleistocene Prehistory of China". In Soffer, Olga (ed.). The Pleistocene Old World: Regional Perspectives. Springer Science & Business Media. pp. 135–144. ISBN 978-94-007-0491-6.
- Liu, Wu; Wu, Xiujie (Mar 23, 2011). "The Hominid Fossils from China Contemporaneous with the Neanderthals and Some Related Studies". In Condemi, Silvana; Weniger, Gerd-Christian (eds.). Continuity and Discontinuity in the Peopling of Europe: One Hundred Fifty Years of Neanderthal Study. Springer Science & Business Media. ISBN 978-94-007-0491-6.
- Tu, Hua; Shen, Guanjun; Li, Haixu; Xie, Fei; Granger, Darryl E. (2015). "26Al/10Be Burial Dating of Xujiayao-Houjiayao Site in Nihewan Basin, Northern China". PLOS ONE. 10 (2) e0118315. Public Library of Science (PLoS). Bibcode:2015PLoSO..1018315T. doi:10.1371/journal.pone.0118315. PMC 4338100. PMID 25706272.
- Wu, Rukang; Jia, Lanpo (1996). "CHINA in the period of Homo sapiens neanderthalensis and contemporaries" (PDF). In de Laet, Sigfried J. (ed.). History of Humanity: Prehistory and the beginnings of civilization. Routledge. pp. 441–445. ISBN 978-92-3-102810-6.
- Wu, Xiu-Jie; Xing, Song; Trinkaus, Erik (March 18, 2013). "An Enlarged Parietal Foramen in the Late Archaic Xujiayao 11 Neurocranium from Northern China, and Rare Anomalies among Pleistocene Homo". PLOS ONE. 8 (3) e59587. Bibcode:2013PLoSO...859587W. doi:10.1371/journal.pone.0059587. PMC 3601107. PMID 23527224.
- Xing, Song; Martinón-Torres, María; Bermúdez de Castro, Jose María; Wu, Xiujie; Liu, Wu (2015). "Hominin teeth from the early Late Pleistocene site of Xujiayao, Northern China". American Journal of Physical Anthropology. 156 (2): 224–240. doi:10.1002/ajpa.22641. PMID 25329008.
- "Ancient human skull in China has Neanderthal-like inner ear". Kaogu. 2014-07-11.
