= List of animals by number of neurons =

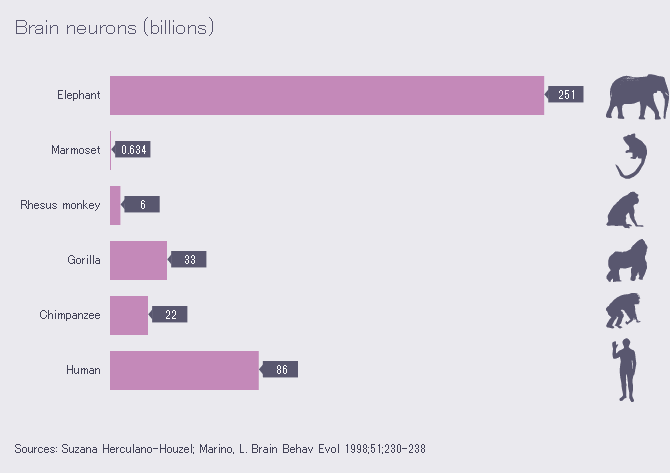
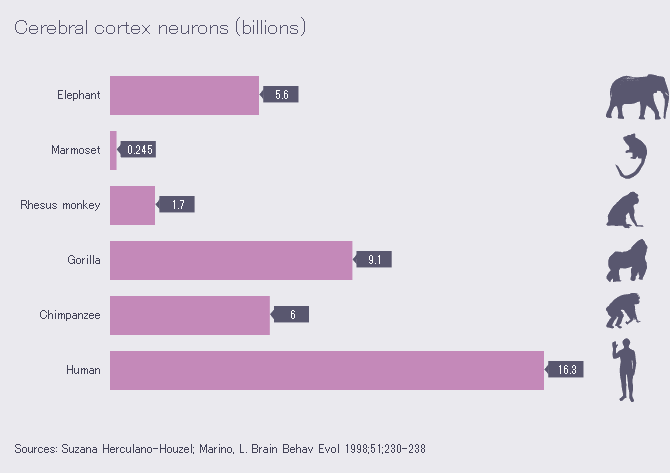
Brief comparisons of number of whole brain neurons (top) and cerebral cortex neurons (bottom) among six mammals.

The following are two lists of animals ordered by the size of their nervous system. The first list shows number of neurons in their entire nervous system. The second list shows the number of neurons in the structure that has been found to be representative of animal intelligence. The human brain contains 86 billion neurons, with 16 billion neurons in the cerebral cortex.

Neuron counts constitute an important source of insight on the topic of neuroscience and intelligence: the question of how the evolution of a set of components and parameters (~10^{11} neurons, ~10^{14} synapses) of a complex system leads to the phenomenon of intelligence.

== Overview ==
Neurons are the cells that transmit information in an animal's nervous system so that it can sense stimuli from its environment and behave accordingly. Not all animals have neurons; Trichoplax and sponges lack nerve cells altogether.

Neurons may be packed to form structures such as the brain of vertebrates or the neural ganglions of insects.

The number of neurons and their relative abundance in different parts of the brain is a determinant of neural function and, consequently, of behavior.

== Whole nervous system ==
All numbers for neurons (except Caenorhabditis and Ciona), and all numbers for synapses (except Ciona) are estimations.

Name	Neurons in the brain & whole nervous system	Synapses	Details	Image	Source
Sponge	0				
Trichoplax	0		Despite no nervous system, it exhibits coordinated feeding and response behaviors.		
Asplanchna brightwellii (rotifer)	~200		Brain only		
Tardigrade	~200		Brain only		
Ciona intestinalis larva (sea squirt)	231	8,617 (central nervous system only)			
Caenorhabditis elegans (roundworm)	302	~7,500	First organism with its whole connectome (neuronal "wiring diagram") completed.		
Starfish	~500		ring of neurons surrounding the mouth		
Hydra vulgaris (fresh-water polyp)	5,600				
Megaphragma mymaripenne	7,400				
Box jellyfish	8,700–17,500		Adult Tripedalia cystophora (8 mm diameter); Does not include 1000 neurons in each of the four rhopalia		
Medicinal leech	10,000				
Pond snail	11,000				
California sea hare	18,000				
Amphioxus	20,000		central nervous system only		
Leptopilina	30,000			Leptopilina boulardii	
Larval zebrafish	100,000				
Fruit fly	150,000		Another organism with the connectome mapped, 139,255 neurons in the female brain and ~20,000 neurons in the ventral nerve cord.		
Wandering spider	100,000				
Calliopsis (bee)	234,000				
Ant	250,000		Varies per species		
Perdita (bee)	275,000				
Melissodes	495,000				
Bombus impatiens	557,000				
Western honey bee	613,000				
Honey bee	960,000	~1×10^{9}			
Cockroach	1,000,000				
Coconut crab	>1,000,000		c. 1,000,000 interneurons are dedicated to analysing olfactory input alone.		
California carpenter bee	1,180,000				
Steudner's dwarf gecko	1,771,000				
Brown anole	2,792,000				
Mochlus sundevallii	3,049,000				
Peloponnese slowworm	3,713,000				
Common house gecko	3,988,000				
Takydromus sexlineatus	4,021,000				
Anolis cristatellus	4,270,000				
Papua snake lizard	4,271,000				
Guppy	4,300,000				
Natal Midlands dwarf chameleon	4,305,000				
Acontias percivali	4,340,000				
Sand lizard	4,341,000				
Ocelot gecko	4,420,000				
Darevskia raddei	4,765,000				
Anolis evermanni	4,920,000				
Echis carinatus	4,951,000				
Cerastes cerastes	4,996,000				
Tenerife gecko	5,001,000				
Draco sumatranus	5,174,000				
Blue-throated keeled lizard	5,269,000				
Crested gecko	5,417,000				
Lacerta strigata	5,529,000				
San Francisco garter snake	5,663,000				
Red-eyed crocodile skink	5,697,000				
Emoia cyanura	5,733,000				
East African spiny-tailed lizard	5,756,000				
Chalcides ocellatus	5,774,000				
Cylindrophis ruffus	5,779,000				
Cat gecko	5,964,000				
Aspidoscelis deppii	5,968,000				
Brown water snake	5,995,000				
Aspidelaps lubricus	6,020,000				
Scincus scincus	6,284,000				
Montivipera xanthina	6,677,000				
Hispaniolan curlytail lizard	7,063,000				
Sceloporus malachiticus	7,149,000				
Crotalus durissus	7,263,000				
Agama agama	7,455,000				
Agama aculeata	7,631,000				
Gekko kuhli	7,659,000				
Leopard gecko	8,081,000				
Latastia longicaudata	8,099,000				
Razor-backed musk turtle	8,389,000				
Greek tortoise	8,520,000				
Phelsuma grandis	8,623,000				
Acanthocercus atricollis	8,650,000				
Tokay gecko	8,892,000				
Russian tortoise	9,008,000				
Marginated tortoise	9,074,000				
Psammophis elegans	9,170,000				
Xenopeltis unicolor	9,293,000				
Zonosaurus Karsteni	9,538,000				
Oplurus quadrimaculatus	9,565,000				
Malagasy giant chameleon	9,751,000				
Ahaetulla prasina	9,767,000				
Dasia olivacea	9,785,000				
Adult zebrafish	~10,000,000		cells (neurons + other)		
Timon tangitanus	10,619,000				
Corn snake	10,629,000				
Acanthosaura capra	10,724,000				
Gallotia galloti	10,903,000				
Eutropis multifasciata	10,944,000				
Rainbow boa	11,083,000				
East African black mud turtle	11,285,000				
Indochinese spitting cobra	11,306,000				
Cyrtodactylus irianjayaensis	11,415,000				
Uromastyx ornata	11,438,000				
Yellow-throated plated lizard	11,847,000				
Meller's chameleon	12,035,000				
Twist-necked turtle	12,171,000				
Western whiptail	12,269,000				
Gehyra vorax	12,388,000				
White-lipped mud turtle	12,671,000				
Painted wood turtle	12,677,000				
Sheltopusik	12,830,000				
Standing's day gecko	13,223,000				
Common snapping turtle	13,681,000				
Painted turtle	14,302,000				
Ocellated lizard	14,593,000				
Oplurus cuvieri	14,627,000				
African spurred tortoise	14,986,000				
Boa imperator	15,194,000				
Red-eared slider	15,388,000				
Plumed basilisk	15,536,000				
Red-bellied short-necked turtle	15,787,000				
Frog	16,000,000				
Corallus hortulana	16,303,000				
Blue-tongued skink	16,376,000				
Gran Canaria giant lizard	18,038,000				
Chinese water dragon	18,301,000				
Chlamydosaurus	18,641,000				
Northern snake-necked turtle	19,040,000				
Spiny-tailed monitor	19,771,000				
Boa constrictor	19,781,000				
Ameiva ameiva	19,835,000				
Chinese softshell turtle	20,697,000				
Amboina box turtle	21,440,000				
Alligator snapping turtle	22,230,000				
Yellow anaconda	23,035,000				
Mexican beaded lizard	23,681,000				
Major skink	24,155,000				
Sudan plated lizard	24,434,000				
Mata mata	26,105,000				
Naked mole-rat	26,880,000				
Weber's sailfin lizard	27,245,000				
Green iguana	29,098,000				
Argentine black and white tegu	29,251,000				
Cyclura nubila	30,820,000				
Gold tegu	31,335,000				
Varanus macraei	33,091,000				
Little free-tailed bat	35,000,000				
Smoky shrew	36,000,000				
Sand goanna	50,253,000				
Short-tailed shrew	52,000,000				
Pig-nosed turtle	53,027,000				
Common bent-wing bat	56,000,000				
African sheath-tailed bat	59,000,000				
Hottentot golden mole	65,000,000				
Woermann's bat	66,000,000				
Zenker's fruit bat	66,000,000				
Commerson's roundleaf bat	67,000,000				
Rufous trident bat	70,000,000				
House mouse	71,000,000	~1×10^{12}			
Asian water monitor	78,231,000				
King quail	80,478,000				
Nile crocodile	80,500,000				
Heart-nosed bat	81,000,000			Heart-nosed bat (Cardioderma cor) in Samburu National Reserve, Kenya.	
Diamond dove	87,879,000				
Golden hamster	90,000,000				
Short-palated fruit bat	99,000,000				
Ansell's mole-rat	103,000,000				
Mashona mole-rat	113,000,000				
Common quail	117,760,000				
Hairy-tailed mole	124,000,000				
Eastern rock elephant shrew	129,000,000				
Star-nosed mole	131,000,000				
Zebra finch	131,000,000		Brain only		
African collared dove	139,271,000				
Silvery mole-rat	148,000,000				
Northern bobwhite	148,399,000				
Four-toed elephant shrew	157,000,000				
Eurasian blackcap	157,000,000				
Wahlberg's epauletted fruit bat	162,000,000				
Goldcrest	164,000,000				
Cape mole-rat	170,000,000				
Grey partridge	170,287,000				
Egyptian fruit bat	172,000,000				
Mechow's mole-rat	174,000,000				
Damaraland mole-rat	178,000,000				
Franquet's epauletted fruit bat	186,000,000				
Brown rat	200,000,000	~4.48×10^{11}			
Guyenne spiny rat	202,000,000				
Eastern mole	204,000,000				
Elegant crested tinamou	217,768,000				
Red junglefowl	221,000,000				
Great tit	226,000,000				
Green-rumped parrotlet	227,000,000				
Quebracho crested tinamou	235,671,000				
Guinea pig	240,000,000				
Chilean tinamou	241,374,000				
Gray mouse lemur	254,710,000				
Common wood pigeon	258,681,000				
Common treeshrew	261,000,000				
Hammer-headed bat	275,000,000				
Wood duck	305,816,000				
Pigeon	310,000,000		Brain only		
Budgerigar	322,000,000				
Pygmy falcon	350,367,000				
Cape dune mole-rat	361,000,000				
Mallard	367,000,000				
Eurasian teal	375,409,000				
Common blackbird	379,000,000				
Marbled duck	386,920,000				
Reeves's pheasant	387,173,000				
Eurasian sparrowhawk	401,751,000				
Ferret	404,000,000				
Cockatiel	453,000,000				
Gray squirrel	453,660,000				
Banded mongoose	454,000,000				
Prairie dog	473,940,000				
Red-breasted goose	482,705,000				
Common starling	483,000,000				
Wild turkey	492,873,000				
European rabbit	494,200,000				
Octopus	500,000,000				
Bigfin reef squid	>500,000,000				
Western tree hyrax	505,000,000				
Eurasian pygmy owl	533,263,000				
Indian peafowl	570,934,000				
Victoria crowned pigeon	578,697,000				
Little owl	585,923,000				
Common kestrel	624,582,000				
Common marmoset	636,000,000				
Eastern rosella	642,000,000				
Yellow-knobbed curassow	652,989,000				
Barn owl	690,000,000				
Monk parakeet	697,000,000				
Greylag goose	738,232,000				
Azure-winged magpie	741,000,000				
Rock hyrax	756,000,000				
Cat	760,000,000	~1×10^{13}			
Black-rumped agouti	857,000,000				
Magpie	897,000,000				
Common hill myna	906,000,000				
Northern greater galago	936,000,000				
Western jackdaw	968,000,000				
Long-eared owl	991,310,000				
Mute swan	1.001×10^{9}				
Common buzzard	1.001×10^{9}				
Black vulture	1.009×10^{9}				
Greater rhea	1.03×10^{9}				
Eurasian jay	1.085×10^{9}				
Alexandrine parakeet	1.096×10^{9}				
Raccoon dog	1.16×10^{9}				
Tanimbar corella	1.161×10^{9}				
Saker falcon	1.204×10^{9}				
Emu	1.335×10^{9}				
Three-striped night monkey	1.468×10^{9}				
Rook	1.509×10^{9}				
Grey parrot	1.566×10^{9}				
Tawny owl	1.58×10^{9}				
Capybara	1.6×10^{9}				
Common ostrich	1.62×10^{9}				
White-tailed eagle	1.65×10^{9}				
Jackal	1.73×10^{9}				
Snowy owl	1.807×10^{9}				
Eurasian eagle-owl	1.897×10^{9}				
Fox	2.11×10^{9}				
Sulphur-crested cockatoo	2.122×10^{9}				
Raccoon	2.148×10^{9}				
Kea	2.149×10^{9}				
Raven	2.171×10^{9}		Brain only		
Domestic pig	2.22×10^{9}				
Dog	2.253×10^{9}				
Dog (Chihuahua)	2.51×10^{9}				
Dog (Chow Chow)	2.61×10^{9}				
Dog (Yorkshire Terrier)	2.64×10^{9}				
Springbok	2.72×10^{9}				
Dog (West Highland White Terrier)	2.83×10^{9}				
Blesbok	3.06×10^{9}				
Blue-and-yellow macaw	3.136×10^{9}		Brain only		
Common squirrel monkey	3.246×10^{9}				
Crab-eating macaque	3.44×10^{9}				
Dog (German Shepherd)	3.53×10^{9}				
Tufted capuchin	3.691×10^{9}				
Bonnet macaque	3.78×10^{9}				
Striped hyena	3.885×10^{9}				
Dog (Komondor)	3.99×10^{9}				
Dog (Transylvanian Hound)	4.39×10^{9}				
Lion	4.667×10^{9}				
Greater kudu	4.91×10^{9}				
Rhesus macaque	6.376×10^{9}				
Brown bear	9.586×10^{9}				
Giraffe	1.075×10^{10}				
Yellow baboon	1.095×10^{10}				
Chimpanzee	2.8×10^{10}				
Orangutan	3.26×10^{10}				
Gorilla	3.34×10^{10}				
Common minke whale	5.7×10^{10}				
Human	8.6×10^{10}	~1.5×10^{14}	Neurons for average adult		
Short-finned pilot whale	1.28×10^{11}				
African elephant	2.57×10^{11}				

== Forebrain (cerebrum or pallium) only ==
Proxies for animal intelligence have varied over the centuries. One early suggestion was brain size (or weight, which provides the same ordering.) A second proposal was brain-to-body-mass ratio, and a third was encephalization quotient, sometimes referred to as EQ. The current best predictor is number of neurons in the forebrain, based on Herculano-Houzel's improved neuron counts. This accounts for variation in the number of neurons in the rest of the brain, for which no link to intelligence has been established. Elephants, for example, have an exceptionally large cerebellum, while birds make do with a much smaller one.

Differing methods have been used to count neurons, and these may differ in degree of reliability. The primary methods are the optical fractionator, an application of stereology and the isotropic fractionator, a recent methodological innovation. Most numbers in the list are the result of studies using the newer isotropic fractionator. A variation of the optical fractionator was responsible for the previous total human brain neuron count of 100,000,000,000 neurons, which has been revised down to 86,000,000,000 by the use of the isotropic fractionator. This is in part why it may be considered to be less reliable. Finally, some numbers are the result of estimations based on correlations observed between number of cortical neurons and brain mass within closely related taxa.

The following table gives information on the number of neurons estimated to be in the sensory-associative structure: the cerebral cortex (aka pallium) for mammals, the dorsal ventricular ridge ("DVR" or "hypopallium") of the pallium for birds, and the corpora pedunculata ("mushroom bodies") for insects.

Common name	Average number of sensory-associative structure neurons (Note: ^ = Estimated * = Optical fractionator)	Intraspecific variation (Note: ± standard deviation)	Method (Note: For the estimated values, the numbers of cortical neurons estimated from brain mass for different mammalian and bird orders are based on correlation observed between number of cortical neuron and brain mass per order)	Sensory-associative structure	Binomial nomenclature	Image	Source
Common fruit fly	2,500*		Optical fractionator	Corpora pedunculata	Drosophila melanogaster		
House cricket	50,000*		Optical fractionator	Corpora pedunculata	Acheta domesticus		
Honey bee	170,000*		Optical fractionator	Corpora pedunculata	Genus: Apis		
Common cockroach	200,000*		Optical fractionator	Corpora pedunculata	Genus: Periplaneta		
African sheath-tailed bat	5,000,000		Isotropic fractionator	Pallium (cortex)	Coleura afra		
Rufous trident bat	6,000,000		Isotropic fractionator	Pallium (cortex)	Triaenops persicus		
Naked mole-rat	6,000,000	± 1,065,587	Isotropic fractionator	Pallium (cortex)	Heterocephalus glaber		
Little free-tailed bat	6,000,000		Isotropic fractionator	Pallium (cortex)	Chaerephon pumilus		
Common bent-wing bat	6,000,000		Isotropic fractionator	Pallium (cortex)	Miniopterus schreibersii		
Commerson's roundleaf bat	8,000,000		Isotropic fractionator	Pallium (cortex)	Hipposideros commersoni		
Heart-nosed bat	10,000,000		Isotropic fractionator	Pallium (cortex)	Cardioderma cor	Heart-nosed bat (Cardioderma cor) in Samburu National Reserve, Kenya.	
Ansell's mole-rat	10,000,000		Isotropic fractionator	Pallium (cortex)	Fukomys anselli		
Smoky shrew	10,000,000	± 352,000	Isotropic fractionator	Pallium (cortex)	Sorex fumeus		
Short-palated fruit bat	10,000,000		Isotropic fractionator	Pallium (cortex)	Casinycteris argynnis		
Mashona mole-rat	12,000,000		Isotropic fractionator	Pallium (cortex)	Fukomys darlingi		
Woermann's bat	12,000,000		Isotropic fractionator	Pallium (cortex)	Megaloglossus woermanni		
Northern short-tailed shrew	12,000,000	± 1,569,000	Isotropic fractionator	Pallium (cortex)	Blarina brevicauda		
Zenker's fruit bat	13,000,000		Isotropic fractionator	Pallium (cortex)	Scotonycteris zenkeri		
House mouse	14,000,000	± 2,242,257	Isotropic fractionator	Pallium (cortex)	Mus musculus		
Hairy-tailed mole	16,000,000	± 2,611,000	Isotropic fractionator	Pallium (cortex)	Parascalops breweri		
Star-nosed mole	17,000,000	± 3,105,000	Isotropic fractionator	Pallium (cortex)	Condylura cristata		
Golden hamster	17,000,000	± 3,619,934	Isotropic fractionator	Pallium (cortex)	Mesocricetus auratus		
Diamond dove	18,209,000		Isotropic fractionator	Pallium (DVR)	Geopelia cuneata		
King quail	20,523,000		Isotropic fractionator	Pallium (DVR)	Synoicus chinensis		
Damaraland mole-rat	21,000,000		Isotropic fractionator	Pallium (cortex)	Fukomys damarensis		
Hottentot golden mole	22,000,000	± 2,154,000	Isotropic fractionator	Pallium (cortex)	Amblysomus hottentotus		
Gray mouse lemur	22,310,000		Isotropic fractionator	Pallium (cortex)	Microcebus murinus		
Common quail	22,568,000		Isotropic fractionator	Pallium (DVR)	Coturnix coturnix		
Mechow's mole-rat	23,000,000		Isotropic fractionator	Pallium (cortex)	Fukomys mechowii		
Franquet's epauletted fruit bat	23,000,000		Isotropic fractionator	Pallium (cortex)	Epomops franqueti		
Hammer-headed bat	24,000,000		Isotropic fractionator	Pallium (cortex)	Hypsignathus mostrosus		
Hedgehog	24,000,000^		Estimated	Pallium (cortex)	Subfamily Erinaceinae, various species		
Silvery mole-rat	25,000,000		Isotropic fractionator	Pallium (cortex)	Heliophobius argenteocinereus		
Wahlberg's epauletted fruit bat	26,000,000		Isotropic fractionator	Pallium (cortex)	Epomophorus wahlbergi		
Cape mole-rat	26,000,000		Isotropic fractionator	Pallium (cortex)	Georychus capensis		
Guyenne spiny rat	26,000,000	± 2,155,723	Isotropic fractionator	Pallium (cortex)	Proechimys cayennensis		
Eastern rock elephant shrew	26,000,000	± 4,020,000	Isotropic fractionator	Pallium (cortex)	Elephantulus myurus		
Eastern mole	27,000,000	± 5,113,000	Isotropic fractionator	Pallium (cortex)	Scalopus aquaticus		
Opossum	27,000,000^		Estimated	Pallium (cortex)	Didelphis virginiana		
Egyptian fruit bat	29,000,000		Isotropic fractionator	Pallium (cortex)	Rousettus aegyptiacus		
Brown Rat	31,000,000	+ 3,034,654	Isotropic fractionator	Pallium (cortex)	Rattus norvegicus		
Four-toed elephant shrew	34,000,000	± 5,840,000	Isotropic fractionator	Pallium (cortex)	Petrodromus tetradactylus		
Grey partridge	36,882,000		Isotropic fractionator	Pallium (DVR)	Perdix perdix		
Ferret	38,950,000		Isotropic fractionator	Pallium (cortex)	Mustela putorius furo		
Northern bobwhite	39,112,000		Isotropic fractionator	Pallium (DVR)	Colinus virginianus		
African collared dove	39,997,000		Isotropic fractionator	Pallium (DVR)	Streptopelia roseogrisea		
Cape dune mole-rat	43,000,000		Isotropic fractionator	Pallium (cortex)	Bathyergus suillus		
Guinea pig	43,510,000	± 3,169,924	Isotropic fractionator	Pallium (cortex)	Cavia porcellus		
Quebracho crested tinamou	48,292,000		Isotropic fractionator	Pallium (DVR)	Eudromia formosa		
Common wood pigeon	51,325,000		Isotropic fractionator	Pallium (DVR)	Columba palumbus		
Elegant crested tinamou	51,384,000		Isotropic fractionator	Pallium (DVR)	Eudromia elegans		
Eurasian blackcap	52,176,000		Isotropic fractionator	Pallium (DVR)	Sylvia atricapilla		
Prairie dog	53,770,000	± 6,044,322	Isotropic fractionator	Pallium (cortex)	Genus:Cynomys		
Zebra finch	55,226,000		Isotropic fractionator	Pallium (DVR)	Taeniopygia guttata		
Chilean tinamou	59,130,000		Isotropic fractionator	Pallium (DVR)	Nothoprocta perdicaria		
Common treeshrew	60,000,000	± 26,510,000	Isotropic fractionator	Pallium (cortex)	Tupaia glis		
Red junglefowl	60,665,000		Isotropic fractionator	Pallium (DVR)	Gallus gallus		
Goldcrest	64,210,000		Isotropic fractionator	Pallium (DVR)	Regulus regulus		
European roller	67,570,000		Isotropic fractionator	Pallium (DVR)	Coracias garrulus		
European rabbit	71,450,000		Isotropic fractionator	Pallium (cortex)	Oryctolagus cuniculus		
Rock dove	71,862,000		Isotropic fractionator	Pallium (DVR)	Columba livia		
Eastern gray squirrel	77,330,000	± 2,634,444	Isotropic fractionator	Pallium (cortex)	Sciurius carolinensis		
Reeves's pheasant	80,688,000		Isotropic fractionator	Pallium (DVR)	Syrmaticus reevesii		
Great tit	83,011,000		Isotropic fractionator	Pallium (DVR)	Parus major		
Speckled mousebird	84,175,000		Isotropic fractionator	Pallium (DVR)	Colius striatus		
Eurasian wryneck	85,387,000		Isotropic fractionator	Pallium (DVR)	Jynx torquilla		
Eurasian sparrowhawk	87,832,000		Isotropic fractionator	Pallium (DVR)	Accipiter nisus		
Western tree hyrax	99,000,000		Isotropic fractionator	Pallium (cortex)	Dendrohyrax dorsalis		
Green-rumped parrotlet	103,418,000		Isotropic fractionator	Pallium (DVR)	Forpus passerinus		
Wild turkey	105,654,000		Isotropic fractionator	Pallium (DVR)	Meleagris gallopavo		
Mallard	112,255,000		Isotropic fractionator	Pallium (DVR)	Anas platyrhynchos		
Black-rumped agouti	113,000,000	± 2,576,768	Isotropic fractionator	Pallium (cortex)	Dasyprocta prymnolopha		
Banded mongoose	115,770,000		Isotropic fractionator	Pallium (cortex)	Mungos mungo		
Victoria crowned pigeon	118,445,000		Isotropic fractionator	Pallium (DVR)	Goura victoria		
Yellow-knobbed curassow	124,624,000		Isotropic fractionator	Pallium (DVR)	Crax daubentoni		
Indian peafowl	129,621,000		Isotropic fractionator	Pallium (DVR)	Pavo cristatus		
Marbled duck	130,142,000		Isotropic fractionator	Pallium (DVR)	Marmaronetta angustirostris		
Pygmy falcon	131,898,000		Isotropic fractionator	Pallium (DVR)	Polihierax semitorquatus		
Common blackbird	136,218,000		Isotropic fractionator	Pallium (DVR)	Turdus merula		
Eurasian hoopoe	136,380,000		Isotropic fractionator	Pallium (DVR)	Upupa epops		
Wood duck	138,206,000		Isotropic fractionator	Pallium (DVR)	Aix sponsa		
Red-breasted goose	148,617,000		Isotropic fractionator	Pallium (DVR)	Branta ruficollis		
Budgerigar	148,910,000		Isotropic fractionator	Pallium (DVR)	Melopsittacus undulatus		
Laughing kookaburra	164,985,000		Isotropic fractionator	Pallium (DVR)	Dacelo novaeguineae		
Eurasian teal	167,287,000		Isotropic fractionator	Pallium (DVR)	Anas crecca		
Rock hyrax	198,000,000	± 29,082,000	Isotropic fractionator	Pallium (cortex)	Procavia capensis		
Red-legged Seriema	219,570,000		Isotropic fractionator	Pallium (DVR)	Cariama cristata		
Northern greater galago	226,000,000	± 87,570,000	Isotropic fractionator	Pallium (cortex)	Otolemur garnettii		
Common starling	226,288,000		Isotropic fractionator	Pallium (DVR)	Sturnus vulgaris		
Common kestrel	237,903,000		Isotropic fractionator	Pallium (DVR)	Falco tinnunculus		
Raccoon dog	240,180,000		Isotropic fractionator	Pallium (cortex)	Nyctereutes procyonoides		
Common marmoset	245,000,000	± 81,180,000	Isotropic fractionator	Pallium (cortex)	Callithrix jacchus		
Muscovy duck	248,163,000		Isotropic fractionator	Pallium (DVR)	Cairina moschata		
House cat	249,830,000		Isotropic fractionator	Pallium (cortex)	Felis catus		
Brown bear	250,970,000		Isotropic fractionator	Pallium (cortex)	Ursus arctos		
Cockatiel	258,481,000		Isotropic fractionator	Pallium (DVR)	Nymphicus hollandicus		
Greylag goose	258,650,000		Isotropic fractionator	Pallium (DVR)	Anser anser		
Capybara	306,500,000	± 62,726,120	Isotropic fractionator	Pallium (cortex)	Hydrochoerus hydrochaeris		
Tarsius	310,000,000		Estimated	Pallium (cortex)	Genus: Tarsius, unknown species		
Great spotted woodpecker	311,900,000		Isotropic fractionator	Pallium (DVR)	Dendrocopos major		
Mute swan	323,661,000		Isotropic fractionator	Pallium (DVR)	Cygnus olor		
Greater rhea	330,342,000		Isotropic fractionator	Pallium (DVR)	Rhea americana		
Eastern rosella	333,274,000		Isotropic fractionator	Pallium (DVR)	Platycercus eximius		
Common buzzard	351,700,000		Isotropic fractionator	Pallium (DVR)	Buteo buteo		
Red-billed hornbill	354,400,000		Isotropic fractionator	Pallium (DVR)	Tockus erythrorhynchus		
Red fox	355,010,000		Isotropic fractionator	Pallium (cortex)	Vulpes vulpes		
Goeldi's marmoset	357,130,000		Isotropic fractionator	Pallium (cortex)	Callimico goeldii		
Eurasian pygmy owl	364,000,000		Isotropic fractionator	Pallium (DVR)	Glaucidium passerinum		
Western grey kangaroo	370,170,000		Isotropic fractionator	Pallium (cortex)	Macropus fuliginosus		
Swan goose	381,100,000		Isotropic fractionator	Pallium (DVR)	Anser cygnoides		
Golden jackal	393,620,000		Isotropic fractionator	Pallium (cortex)	Canis aureus		
Monk parakeet	396,183,000		Isotropic fractionator	Pallium (DVR)	Myiopsitta monachus		
Springbok	396,900,000		Isotropic fractionator	Pallium (cortex)	Antidorcas marsupialis		
Black vulture	398,899,000		Isotropic fractionator	Pallium (DVR)	Coragyps atratus		
Azure-winged magpie	399,695,000		Isotropic fractionator	Pallium (DVR)	Cyanopica cyanus		
Little owl	400,822,000		Isotropic fractionator	Pallium (DVR)	Athene noctua		
Common hill myna	410,330,000		Isotropic fractionator	Pallium (DVR)	Gracula religiosa		
European green woodpecker	424,400,000		Isotropic fractionator	Pallium (DVR)	Picus viridis		
Domesticated pig	425,000,000*		Optical fractionator	Pallium (cortex)	Sus scrofa domesticus		
Emu	439,300,000		Isotropic fractionator	Pallium (DVR)	Dromaius novaehollandiae		
West Highland White Terrier	440,160,000		Isotropic fractionator	Pallium (cortex)	Canis lupus familiaris		
Three-striped night monkey	442,000,000	± 111,310,000	Isotropic fractionator	Pallium (cortex)	Aotus trivirgatus		
Saker falcon	442,946,000		Isotropic fractionator	Pallium (DVR)	Falco cherrug		
Eurasian magpie	443,187,000		Isotropic fractionator	Pallium (DVR)	Pica pica		
Raccoon	453,000,000		Isotropic fractionator	Pallium (cortex)	Procyon lotor		
Black woodpecker	457,400,000		Isotropic fractionator	Pallium (DVR)	Dryocopus martius		
Chow Chow	471,500,000		Isotropic fractionator	Pallium (cortex)	Canis lupus familiaris		
Common ostrich	479,410,000		Isotropic fractionator	Pallium (DVR)	Struthio camelus		
Barn owl	480,670,000		Isotropic fractionator	Pallium (DVR)	Tyto alba		
Western jackdaw	491,678,000		Isotropic fractionator	Pallium (DVR)	Coloeus monedula		
Striped hyena	495,280,000		Isotropic fractionator	Pallium (cortex)	Hyaena hyaena		
Chihuahua	513,330,000		Isotropic fractionator	Pallium (cortex)	Canis lupus familiaris		
Eurasian jay	528,770,000		Isotropic fractionator	Pallium (DVR)	Garrulus glandarius		
White-tailed eagle	542,926,000		Isotropic fractionator	Pallium (DVR)	Haliaeetus albicilla		
Lion	545,240,000		Isotropic fractionator	Pallium (cortex)	Panthera leo		
Blesbok	570,670,000		Isotropic fractionator	Pallium (cortex)	Damaliscus pygargus phillipsi		
Yorkshire Terrier	572,140,000		Isotropic fractionator	Pallium (cortex)	Canis lupus familiaris		
Alexandrine parakeet	574,648,000		Isotropic fractionator	Pallium (DVR)	Psittacula eupatria		
Tanimbar corella	599,227,000		Isotropic fractionator	Pallium (DVR)	Cacatua goffiniana		
Golden Retriever	627,000,000		Isotropic fractionator	Pallium (cortex)	Canis lupus familiaris		
Striated caracara	663,370,000		Isotropic fractionator	Pallium (DVR)	Phalcoboenus australis		
Long-eared owl	673,000,000		Isotropic fractionator	Pallium (DVR)	Asio otus		
Transylvanian Hound	725,760,000		Isotropic fractionator	Pallium (cortex)	Canis lupus familiaris		
Greater kudu	762,570,000		Isotropic fractionator	Pallium (cortex)	Tragelaphus strepsiceros		
Trumpeter hornbill	799,932,800		Isotropic fractionator	Pallium (DVR)	Bycanistes bucinator		
Crab-eating macaque	800,960,000		Isotropic fractionator	Pallium (cortex)	Macaca fascicularis		
Rook	820,305,000		Isotropic fractionator	Pallium (DVR)	Corvus frugilegus		
Beagle	844,410,000		Isotropic fractionator	Pallium (cortex)	Canis lupus familiaris		
Grey parrot	850,100,000		Isotropic fractionator	Pallium (DVR)	Psittacus erithacus		
Komondor	883,380,000		Isotropic fractionator	Pallium (cortex)	Canis lupus familiaris		
German Shepherd	885,460,000		Isotropic fractionator	Pallium (cortex)	Canis lupus familiaris		
Sulphur-crested cockatoo	1,135,000,000		Isotropic fractionator	Pallium (DVR)	Cacatua galerita		
Tufted capuchin	1,140,000,000		Isotropic fractionator	Pallium (cortex)	Sapajus apella		
Tawny owl	1,153,000,000		Isotropic fractionator	Pallium (DVR)	Strix aluco		
Harp seal	1,168,000,000^ 6,100,000,000*		Estimated Optical fractionator	Pallium (cortex)	Pagophilus groenlandicus		
Silvery-cheeked hornbill	1,177,000,000		Isotropic fractionator	Pallium (DVR)	Bycanistes brevis		
Horse	1,200,000,000^		Estimated	Pallium (cortex)	Equus ferus caballus		
Raven	1,204,000,000		Isotropic fractionator	Pallium (DVR)	Corvus corax		
Snowy owl	1,270,000,000		Isotropic fractionator	Pallium (DVR)	Bubo scandiacus		
Kea	1,281,000,000		Isotropic fractionator	Pallium (DVR)	Nestor notabilis		
Eurasian eagle-owl	1,328,000,000		Isotropic fractionator	Pallium (DVR)	Bubo bubo		
Common squirrel monkey	1,340,000,000	± 20,000,000	Isotropic fractionator	Pallium (cortex)	Saimiri sciureus		
Bonnet macaque	1,660,000,000		Isotropic fractionator	Pallium (cortex)	Macaca radiata		
Great grey owl	1,700,000,000		Isotropic fractionator	Pallium (cortex)	Strix nebulosa		
Rhesus macaque	1,710,000,000		Isotropic fractionator	Pallium (cortex)	Macaca mulatta		
Giraffe	1,731,000,000		Isotropic fractionator	Pallium (cortex)	Giraffa camelopardalis		
Blue and yellow macaw	1,917,000,000		Isotropic fractionator	Pallium (DVR)	Ara ararauna		
Pygmy sperm whale	2,020,000,000*		Optical fractionator	Pallium (cortex)	Kogia breviceps		
Leopard seal	2,386,000,000^		Estimated	Pallium (cortex)	Hydrurga leptonyx		
Guenon	2,500,000,000^		Estimated	Pallium (cortex)	Genus: Cercopithecus, unknown species		
Pigtail Macaque	2,531,000,000^		Estimated	Pallium (cortex)	Macaca nemestrina		
Gelada baboon	2,568,000,000^		Estimated	Pallium (cortex)	Theropithecus gelada		
Red-and-green macaw	2,646,000,000^		Estimated	Telencephalon (Pallium + Subpallium)	Ara chloropterus		
Harbor porpoise	2,750,000,000*		Optical fractionator	Pallium (cortex)	Phocoena phocoena		
Yellow baboon	2,880,000,000		Isotropic fractionator	Pallium (cortex)	Papio cynocephalus		
Hyacinth macaw	2,944,000,000^		Estimated	Telencephalon (Pallium + Subpallium)	Anodorhynchus hyacinthinus		
Hamadryas baboon	2,990,000,000^		Estimated	Pallium (cortex)	Papio hamadryas		
Mandrill	3,102,000,000^		Estimated	Pallium (cortex)	Mandrillus sphinx		
Common minke whale	3,134,000,000 12,800,000,000*		Isotropic fractionator Optical fractionator	Pallium (cortex)	Balaenoptera acutorostrata		
Walrus	3,929,000,000^		Estimated	Pallium (cortex)	Odobenus rosmarus		
Southern elephant seal	3,994,000,000^		Estimated	Pallium (cortex)	Mirounga leonina		
Fin whale	5,000,000,000^ 15,000,000,000^		Estimated	Pallium (cortex)	Balaenoptera physalus		
Blue whale	5,000,000,000^		Estimated	Pallium (cortex)	Balaenoptera musculus		
African elephant	5,600,000,000		Isotropic fractionator	Pallium (cortex)	Loxodonta africana		
Pygmy chimpanzee or bonobo	6,250,000,000^		Estimated	Pallium (cortex)	Pan paniscus		
Short-beaked common dolphin	6,700,000,000* 4,800,000,000^		Optical fractionator Estimated	Pallium (cortex)	Delphinus delphis		
Asian elephant	6,775,000,000^		Estimated	Pallium (cortex)	Elephas maximus		
Chimpanzee	7,400,000,000*		Optical fractionator	Pallium (cortex)	Pan troglodytes		
Orangutan	7,704,000,000^ - 8,900,000,000^		Estimated	Pallium (cortex)	Genus: Pongo		
Western gorilla	9,100,000,000^		Estimated	Pallium (cortex)	Gorilla gorilla		
Cuvier's beaked whale	9,100,000,000*		Optical fractionator	Pallium (cortex)	Ziphius cavirostris		
Beluga whale	10,000,000,000^		Estimated	Pallium (cortex)	Delphinapterus leucas		
Risso's dolphin	10,000,000,000^		Estimated	Pallium (cortex)	Grampus griseus		
Short-finned pilot whale	11,850,000,000		Isotropic fractionator	Pallium (cortex)	Globicephala macrorhynchus		
Bottlenose dolphin	12,700,000,000* 8,700,000,000^		Optical fractionator Estimated	Pallium (cortex)	Tursiops truncatus		
Long-finned pilot whale	13,966,000,000^ 37,200,000,000*		Estimated Optical fractionator	Pallium (cortex)	Globicephala melas		
Human	16,340,000,000 21,000,000,000*	± 2,170,000,000	Isotropic fractionator Optical fractionator	Pallium (cortex)	Homo sapiens		
Orca	43,100,000,000* 21,000,000,000^		Optical fractionator Estimated	Pallium (cortex)	Orcinus orca		

== See also ==
- Lists of animals
- Theory of mind in animals
- Brain size
- Brain–body mass ratio
- Encephalization quotient
- Connectome
- Connectomics
- Cranial capacity
- fr:Noogenèse
- Neuroscience and intelligence

== Notes ==
Reference 56 cited for all dog neuron numbers on this Wikipedia page is a Univerzita Karlova student review of a single 2017 study by Suzana Herculano-Houzel (a self avowed "dog person") which has not been independently replicated.
