= Neuroimaging intelligence testing =

Neuroimaging intelligence testing concerns the use of neuroimaging techniques to evaluate human intelligence. Neuroimaging technology has advanced such that scientists hope to use neuroimaging increasingly for investigations of brain function related to IQ.

== IQ testing ==
Traditional IQ tests observe the test-taker's performance in a standardized battery of samples of behavior. The resulting IQ standard score is the subject of much investigation as psychologists check correlations between IQ and other life outcomes. The Wechsler IQ tests for adults and for children have long been regarded as the "gold standard" in IQ testing.

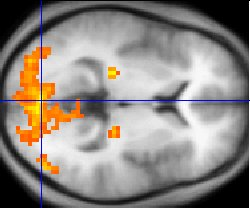
fMRI data showing regions of activation

== Neural bases of intelligence ==
The varying techniques of imaging-based testing search for different signs of intelligence. The types of intelligence analyzed in this review were fluid intelligence (Gf), general intelligence (g), and crystallized intelligence (Gc). Early studies utilized information from patients with brain damage, noticing changes in intelligence scores that correlated to certain regions of the brain. As imaging technology has improved, so has the ability for deeper neuro-analysis. MRI studies have found that the volume of gray matter correlates to intelligence, providing evidence for generalizations made regarding brain/head-size and intelligence. Additionally, PET and fMRI studies have revealed more information regarding the functionality of certain regions of the brain.

By recording and interpreting the brain activity of subjects as they complete a variety of tasks, researchers are able to draw connections between the types of task (and thus, the type of intelligence) that calls on particular areas of the brain. Knowing how parts of the brain are utilized may reveal more information about the structure and hierarchy used in neural development. It also may provide interesting information regarding the pathways of neural signals as they navigate the nervous system. Image-based testing may allow researchers to discover why certain neurons are connected, if they are indeed aligned in a purposeful manner and consequently, how to repair such pathways when they are damaged.

In general, there have been two types of intelligence studies: psychometric and biological. Biological approaches make use of neuroimaging techniques and examine brain function. Psychometrics focuses on mental abilities. Ian Deary and associates suggest that a greater overlap of these techniques will reveal new findings.

== Psychometrics ==
Psychometrics is a field of study specifically dedicated to psychological measurement and involves two main tasks: (i) constructing instruments and procedures for measurement; and (ii) the development and refinement of theoretical approaches to measurement. Brain-based intelligence tests are concerned with both of these aspects. Modern techniques have evolved to focus on a few biological characteristics: Brain ERPs, brain size, and speed of neural conduction. Various instruments have been employed to measure these things.

=== Brain event-related potentials (ERPs) ===
Brain ERPs allow for the "sequencing" of psychologically interesting processing. These event-related potentials are measured brain responses to specific stimuli, such as sensory, cognitive or motor events. ERPs, when compared to "mental speed," have shown a negative correlation with IQ. Research with ERPs suggests that high IQ individuals have a faster response time in some test conditions, have distinguishable ERP waveforms that are different than those of people with lower IQs, and may have less variability in their ERPs. The lack of variability suggests that individuals with a high IQ will have good scores in a variety of testing situations.

ERPs can be measured using electroencephalography (EEG), which uses electrodes placed on the scalp to measure the electrical activity of the brain. The ERP waveform itself is constructed from the averaged results of many trials (100 or more). The average reduces signal noise from random-brain activity, leaving just the ERP. An advantage of ERPs are that they measure processing between stimulus and response continuously. Having this stream of information makes it possible to see where the brain's electrical activity is being affected by specific stimuli.

=== Brain size ===
Using MRI, researchers are able to acquire volumetric measurements of brain size. Some studies have tried to explain the relationship between brain size (meaning volume) and intelligence, specifically in terms of IQ. In general, it has been found that Full Scale IQ and Verbal IQ have a stronger correlation with brain size than Performance IQ. It is thought by some that grey and white matter specifically relate to different IQs (grey matter with Verbal IQ and white matter with Performance IQ), but the results have not been consistent. It has been found that within the cortex, the correlation with IQ was very influenced by the volume of prefrontal grey matter.

A 2009 study examined intracerebral volumetric relationships in twins. Making use of high resolution MRI data, they found strong genetic connections correlations between cerebral structures. Specifically, the study suggests that a strong correlation exists between the tissue type or spatial proximity and genes. By examining the differences or lack thereof between the brain size of twin children, the researchers drew conclusions that individuals that share genes (i.e. twins) will show similar physiological brain properties compared to genetically-unrelated individuals. This study provides evidence of the genetic influence of the brain structure and size, which are believed to both influence intelligence in some way.

Another study in 2006 examined 100 postmortem brains, seeking a relationship between an individual’s Full Scale Wechsler Adult Intelligence Scale score and the volume of their brain regions. Prior to death, the subjects had completed the WAIS test, which measures verbal and visuospatial abilities. The factors considered important to the relationship between brain size and intelligence were age, sex and hemispheric functional lateralization. They found that general verbal ability was correlated with cerebral volume in women and right-handed men. It was not possible to find a relationship between ability and volume in with every group, however.

=== Neural conduction speed ===
Nerve conduction velocity (NCV) has been studied, giving varying results. Some have hypothesized that "higher intelligence is associated with better 'neural efficiency.'" A few studies suggested an association between nerve conduction velocity and scores on the Multidimensional Aptitude Battery (MAB). However, other studies have challenged these claims, finding little correlation between nerve conduction velocity and reaction time (RT).

=== Raven's Progressive Matrices ===
Raven's Progressive Matrices (RPM) is a test consisting of 60 multiple-choice questions that increase in difficulty. RPM is based on pattern recognition and is a nonverbal group test, requiring the test taker to identify the missing element that completes the pattern. The test is designed to measure reasoning ability. The results of these tests are then paired with the results of imaging studies and relationships are drawn i.e. higher RPM scores and the increased size of a specific brain structure.

=== Raven's Advanced Progressive Matrices ===
Raven's Advanced Progressive Matrices (RAPM) is a 36-item test used to measure gF. RAPM tests for differences in novel problem solving and reasoning abilities. Similar to the RPM, subjects complete the pattern, identifying the missing piece of a 3x3 matrix from a list of eight options.

=== n-Back Working Memory (WM) task ===
The n-back WM task has commonly utilized to measure cognitive activity during neuroimaging. According to Burgess et al.,

"The n-back task is typically thought to require the updating of information in WM, because, for each sequentially presented item, the participant must judge whether it matches the item presented n trials back (where n is prespecified, and usually equals 1, 2, or 3 items)."

While inside the MRI machine, subjects are asked to complete a variety of tasks. The brain activity is then captured and recorded by using MRI, allowing specific brain responses to be paired with their respective n-back tasks.

== Neuroimaging techniques ==
=== PET ===
Positron emission tomography detects gamma rays as they are emitted from a tracer that has been injected into the body. It is useful in neuroimaging because of the assumption that areas of high radioactivity are associated with high brain activity.

=== CAT Scan ===
Computed axial tomography (CAT) or computed tomography (CT) creates tomographic images of the body. For neuroimaging studies, computer-processed X-rays are used and the amount of X-ray blockage by different structures is used to generate image 'slices' of the brain. CAT scans are particularly useful for determining the size (volume) of specific structures of the brain.

== Global connectivity ==
A 2012 study from Washington University in St. Louis described the global connectivity of the prefrontal cortex. Global connectivity is the mechanism by which components of the frontoparietal brain network might coordinate control of other tasks. Cole et al. wrote that:

"A lateral prefrontal cortex (LPFC) region's activity was found to predict performance in a high control demand working memory task and also to exhibit high global connectivity. Critically, global connectivity in this LPFC region, involving connections both within and outside the frontoparietal network, showed a highly selective relationship with individual differences in fluid intelligence."

The lateral prefrontal cortex is a region of interest because those who have injuries to that part of the brain often have issues with common, everyday tasks such as planning their day. The LPFC is thought to be important for "cognitive control capacity," which can be used to predict future outcomes such as success in school and the workplace. It was found by van den Heuvel et al. that higher intelligence individuals employ more efficient whole-brain network organization. This had led to the thought that cognitive control capacity may be supported by these whole-brain network properties. The 2012 study used a theoretic approach to neuroimage data known as global brain connectivity (GBC) or weighted degree centrality. GBC let the researches look closely at specific regions and their range of connectivity. It was then possible to examine each region's role in human cognitive control and intelligence. The study used fMRI to acquire data and examine each region's connectivity.

== Ethical implications ==
Privacy and confidentiality are major concerns for neuroimaging studies. With high-resolution anatomical images, such as those generated by fMRI, it is possible to identify individual subjects, putting their personal / medical privacy at risk. It is possible to create surface renderings of the brain and face from a volumetric MRI, which can be paired with photographs to identify the individual.

It is becoming more accepted that a neurobiological basis for intelligence exists (at least for reasoning and problem-solving). The success of these intelligence studies present ethical issues. A large concern for the general population is the issue of race and intelligence. While little variation has been found between racial groups, the public perception of intelligence studies has been negatively impacted by concerns of racism. It is important to consider the consequences of studies that investigate intelligence differences in population-groups (racial or ethnic) and if it is ethical to conduct these studies. A study suggesting that one group is biologically more intelligent than another may cause tension. This has made neuroscientists reluctant to investigate individual or group differences in intelligence, as they may be perceived as racist.

== See also ==
- Evolution of human intelligence
- Neuroscience and intelligence
