= Encephalization quotient =

Relative brain size measure

Encephalization quotient (EQ), encephalization level (EL), or just encephalization is a relative brain size measure that is defined as the ratio between observed and predicted brain mass for an animal of a given size, based on nonlinear regression on a range of reference species. It has been used as a proxy for intelligence and thus as a possible way of comparing the intelligence levels of different species. For this purpose, it is a more refined measurement than the raw brain-to-body mass ratio, as it takes into account allometric effects. Expressed as a formula, the relationship has been developed for mammals and may not yield relevant results when applied outside this group.

== Perspective on intelligence measures ==
Encephalization quotient was developed in an attempt to provide a way of correlating an animal's physical characteristics with perceived intelligence. It improved on the previous attempt, brain-to-body mass ratio, so it has persisted. Subsequent work, notably Roth, found EQ to be flawed and suggested brain size was a better predictor, but that has problems as well.

Currently the best predictor for intelligence across all animals is forebrain neuron count. This was not seen earlier because neuron counts were previously inaccurate for most animals. For example, human brain neuron count was given as 100 billion for decades before Herculano-Houzel found a more reliable method of counting brain cells.

It could have been anticipated that EQ might be superseded because of both the number of exceptions and the growing complexity of the formulae it used. (See the rest of this article.) The simplicity of counting neurons has replaced it. The concept in EQ of comparing the brain capacity exceeding that required for body sense and motor activity may yet live on to provide an even better prediction of intelligence, but that work has not been done yet.

=== Variance in brain sizes ===
Body size accounts for 80–90% of the variance in brain size, between species, and a relationship described by an allometric equation: the regression of the logarithms of brain size on body size. The distance of a species from the regression line is a measure of its encephalization. The scales are logarithmic, distance, or residual, is an encephalization quotient (EQ), the ratio of actual brain size to expected brain size. Encephalization is a characteristic of a species.

Rules for brain size relates to the number brain neurons have varied in evolution, then not all mammalian brains are necessarily built as larger or smaller versions of a same plan, with proportionately larger or smaller numbers of neurons. Similarly sized brains, such as a cow or chimpanzee, might in that scenario contain very different numbers of neurons, just as a very large cetacean brain might contain fewer neurons than a gorilla brain. Size comparison between the human brain and non-primate brains, larger or smaller, might simply be inadequate and uninformative – and our view of the human brain as outlier, a special oddity, may have been based on the mistaken assumption that all brains are made the same (Herculano-Houzel, 2012).

=== Limitations and possible improvements over EQ ===
There is a distinction between brain parts that are necessary for the maintenance of the body and those that are associated with improved cognitive functions. These brain parts, although functionally different, all contribute to the overall weight of the brain. Jerison (1973) has for this reason considered 'extra neurons', neurons that contribute strictly to cognitive capacities, as more important indicators of intelligence than pure EQ. Gibson et al. (2001) reasoned that bigger brains generally contain more 'extra neurons' and thus are better predictors of cognitive abilities than pure EQ among primates.

Factors such as the recent evolution of the cerebral cortex and different degrees of brain folding (gyrification), which increases the surface area (and volume) of the cortex, are positively correlated to intelligence in humans.

In a meta-analysis, Deaner et al. (2007) tested absolute brain size (ABS), cortex size, cortex-to-brain ratio, EQ, and corrected relative brain size (cRBS) against global cognitive capacities. They have found that, after normalization, only ABS and neocortex size showed significant correlation to cognitive abilities. In primates, ABS, neocortex size, and Nc (the number of cortical neurons) correlated fairly well with cognitive abilities. However, there were inconsistencies found for Nc. According to the authors, these inconsistencies were the result of the faulty assumption that Nc increases linearly with the size of the cortical surface. This notion is incorrect because the assumption does not take into account the variability in cortical thickness and cortical neuron density, which should influence Nc.

According to Cairo (2011), EQ has flaws to its design when considering individual data points rather than a species as a whole. It is inherently biased given that the cranial volume of an obese and underweight individual would be roughly similar, but their body masses would be drastically different. Another difference of this nature is a lack of accounting for sexual dimorphism. For example, the female human generally has smaller cranial volume than the male; however, this does not mean that a female and male of the same body mass would have different cognitive abilities. Considering all of these flaws, EQ should not be viewed as a valid metric for intraspecies comparison.

The notion that encephalization quotient corresponds to intelligence has been disputed by Roth and Dicke (2012). They consider the absolute number of cortical neurons and neural connections as better correlates of cognitive ability. According to Roth and Dicke (2012), mammals with relatively high cortex volume and neuron packing density (NPD) are more intelligent than mammals with the same brain size. The human brain stands out from the rest of the mammalian and vertebrate taxa because of its large cortical volume and high NPD, conduction velocity, and cortical parcellation. All aspects of human intelligence are found, at least in its primitive form, in other nonhuman primates, mammals, or vertebrates, with the exception of syntactical language. Roth and Dicke consider syntactical language an "intelligence amplifier".

== Brain-body size relationship ==
Species	Simple brain-to-body ratio (E/S)
Treeshrew	1/10
Small birds (Note: E.g., most passerines.)	1/12
Human	1/40
Mouse	1/40
Dolphin	1/50
Cat	1/100
Chimpanzee	1/110
Dog	1/120
Frog	1/170
Lion	1/550
Elephant	1/560
Horse	1/600
Shark	1/2500
Hippopotamus	1/2800

Brain size usually increases with body size in animals (i.e., it's positively correlated), therefore large animals usually have larger brains than smaller animals. The relationship is not linear, however. Generally, small mammals have relatively larger brains than big ones. Mice have a direct brain/body size ratio similar to humans (1/40), while elephants have a comparatively small brain/body size (1/560), despite being quite intelligent animals. Treeshrews have a brain/body mass ratio of (1/10).

Several reasons for this trend are possible, one of which is that neural cells have a relative constant size. Some brain functions, like the brain pathway responsible for a basic task like drawing breath, are basically similar in a mouse and an elephant. Thus, the same amount of brain matter can govern breathing in a large or a small body. While not all control functions are independent of body size, some are, and hence large animals need comparatively less brain than small animals. This phenomenon can be described by an equation $C = E/S^{2/3},$ where $E$ and $S$ are brain and body weights respectively, and $C$ is called the cephalization factor. To determine the value of this factor, the brain and body weights of various mammals were plotted against each other, and the curve of such formula chosen as the best fit to that data.

The cephalization factor and the subsequent encephalization quotient was developed by H. J. Jerison in the late 1960s. The formula for the curve varies, but an empirical fitting of the formula to a sample of mammals gives
$$\frac{w(\text{brain})}{1~\text{g}} = 0.12 \left(\frac{w(\text{body})}{1~\text{g}}\right)^{\frac{2}{3}} = 12 \left(\frac{w(\text{body})}{1~\text{kg}}\right)^{\frac{2}{3}}.$$
As this formula is based on data from mammals, it should be applied to other animals with caution. For some of the other vertebrate classes the power of 3/4 rather than 2/3 is sometimes used, and for many groups of invertebrates the formula may give no meaningful results at all.

== Calculation ==
Snell's equation of simple allometry is

$$E = CS^r,$$

where $E$ is the weight of the brain, $C$ is the cephalization factor, $S$ is body weight, and $r$ is the exponential constant.

The "encephalization quotient" (EQ) is the coefficient $C$ in Snell's allometry equation, usually normalized with respect to a reference species. In the following table, the coefficients have been normalized with respect to the value for the cat, which is therefore attributed an EQ of 1.

Another way to calculate encephalization quotient is by dividing the actual weight of an animal's brain with its predicted weight according to Jerison's formula.

Species	Encephalization quotient (EQ)
Human	7.4–7.8
Northern right whale dolphin	5.55
Bottlenose dolphin	5.26
Orca	2.57–3.3
Chimpanzee	2.2–2.5
Raven	2.49
Domestic pig (newborn)	2.42
Rhesus macaque	2.1
Red fox	1.92
Elephant	1.75–2.36
Raccoon	1.62
Gorilla	1.39
California sea lion	1.39
Chinchilla	1.34
Dog	1.2
Squirrel	1.1
Cat	1.00
Hyena	0.92
Horse	0.92
Elephant shrew	0.82
Brown bear	0.82
Sheep	0.8
Taurine cattle	0.52–0.59
Mouse	0.5
Rat	0.4
Rabbit	0.4
Domestic pig (adult)	0.38
Hippopotamus	0.37
Opossum	0.2

This measurement of approximate intelligence is more accurate for mammals than for other classes and phyla of Animalia.

== EQ and intelligence in mammals ==
Intelligence in animals is hard to establish, but the larger the brain is relative to the body, the more brain weight might be available for more complex cognitive tasks. The EQ formula, as opposed to the method of simply measuring raw brain weight or brain weight to body weight, makes for a ranking of animals that coincides better with observed complexity of behaviour. A primary reason for the use of EQ instead of a simple brain to body mass ratio is that smaller animals tend to have a higher proportional brain mass, but do not show the same indications of higher cognition as animals with a high EQ.

=== Grey floor ===
The driving theorization behind the development of EQ is that an animal of a certain size requires a minimum number of neurons for basic functioning, sometimes referred to as a grey floor. There is also a limit to how large an animal's brain can grow given its body size – due to limitations like gestation period, energetics, and the need to physically support the encephalized region throughout maturation. When normalizing a standard brain size for a group of animals, a slope can be determined to show what a species' expected brain to body mass ratio would be. Species with brain to body mass ratios below this standard are nearing the grey floor, and do not need extra grey matter. Species which fall above this standard have more grey matter than is necessary for basic functions. Presumably these extra neurons are used for higher cognitive processes.

=== Taxonomic trends ===
Mean EQ for mammals is around 1, with carnivorans, cetaceans and primates above 1, and insectivores and herbivores below. Large mammals tend to have the highest EQs of all animals, while small mammals and avians have similar EQs. This reflects two major trends. One is that brain matter is extremely costly in terms of energy needed to sustain it. Animals with nutrient rich diets tend to have higher EQs, which is necessary for the energetically costly tissue of brain matter. Not only is it metabolically demanding to grow throughout embryonic and postnatal development, it is costly to maintain as well.

Arguments have been made that some carnivores may have higher EQ's due to their relatively enriched diets, as well as the cognitive capacity required for effectively hunting prey. One example of this is brain size of a wolf; about 30% larger than a similarly sized domestic dog, potentially derivative of different needs in their respective way of life.

=== Dietary trends ===
Of the animals demonstrating the highest EQ's (see associated table), many are primarily frugivores, including apes, macaques, and proboscideans. This dietary categorization is significant to inferring the pressures which drive higher EQ's. Specifically, frugivores must utilize a complex, trichromatic map of visual space to locate and pick ripe fruits and are able to provide for the high energetic demands of increased brain mass.

Trophic level—"height" on the food chain—is yet another factor that has been correlated with EQ in mammals. Eutheria with either high AB (absolute brain-mass) or high EQ occupy positions at high trophic levels. Eutheria low on the network of food chains can only develop a high RB (relative brain-mass) so long as they have small body masses. This presents an interesting conundrum for intelligent small animals, who have behaviors radically different from intelligent large animals.

According to Steinhausen et al.(2016):

Animals with high RB [relative brain-mass] usually have (1) a short life span, (2) reach sexual maturity early, and (3) have short and frequent gestations. Moreover, males of species with high RB also have few potential sexual partners. In contrast, animals with high EQs have (1) a high number of potential sexual partners, (2) delayed sexual maturity, and (3) rare gestations with small litter sizes.

=== Sociality ===
Another factor previously thought to have great impact on brain size is sociality and flock size. This was a long-standing theory until the correlation between frugivory and EQ was shown to be more statistically significant. While no longer the predominant inference as to selection pressure for high EQ, the social brain hypothesis still has some support. For example, dogs (a social species) have a higher EQ than cats (a mostly solitary species). Animals with very large flock size and/or complex social systems consistently score high EQ, with dolphins and orcas having the highest EQ of all cetaceans, and humans with their extremely large societies and complex social life topping the list by a good margin.

== Comparisons with non-mammalian animals ==
Birds generally have lower EQ than mammals, but parrots and particularly the corvids show remarkable complex behaviour and high learning ability. Their brains are at the high end of the bird spectrum, but low compared to mammals. Bird cell size is on the other hand generally smaller than that of mammals, which may mean more brain cells and hence synapses per volume, allowing for more complex behaviour from a smaller brain. Both bird intelligence and brain anatomy are however very different from those of mammals, making direct comparison difficult.

Manta rays have the highest EQ among fish, and either octopuses or jumping spiders have the highest among invertebrates. Despite the jumping spider having a huge brain for its size, it is minuscule in absolute terms, and humans have a much higher EQ despite having a lower raw brain-to-body weight ratio. Mean EQs for reptiles are about one tenth of those of mammals. EQ in birds (and estimated EQ in other dinosaurs) generally also falls below that of mammals, possibly due to lower thermoregulation and/or motor control demands. Estimation of brain size in Archaeopteryx (one of the oldest known ancestors of birds), shows it had an EQ well above the reptilian range, and just below that of living birds.

Biologist Stephen Jay Gould has noted that if one looks at vertebrates with very low encephalization quotients, their brains are slightly less massive than their spinal cords. Theoretically, intelligence might correlate with the absolute amount of brain an animal has after subtracting the weight of the spinal cord from the brain. This formula is useless for invertebrates because they do not have spinal cords or, in some cases, central nervous systems.

== EQ in paleoneurology ==
Behavioral complexity in living animals can to some degree be observed directly, making the predictive power of the encephalization quotient less relevant. It is however central in paleoneurology, where the endocast of the brain cavity and estimated body weight of an animal is all one has to work from. The behavior of extinct mammals and dinosaurs is typically investigated using EQ formulas.

Encephalization quotient is also used in estimating evolution of intelligent behavior in human ancestors. This technique can help in mapping the development of behavioral complexities during human evolution. However, this technique is only limited to when there are both cranial and post-cranial remains associated with individual fossils, to allow for brain to body size comparisons. For example, remains of one Middle Pleistocene human fossil from Jinniushan province in northern China has allowed scientists to study the relationship between brain and body size using the Encephalization Quotient. Researchers obtained an EQ of 4.150 for the Jinniushan fossil, and then compared this value with preceding Middle Pleistocene estimates of EQ at 3.7770. The difference in EQ estimates has been associated with a rapid increase in encephalization in Middle Pleistocene hominins. Paleo-neurological comparisons between Neanderthals and anatomically modern Homo sapiens (AMHS) via Encephalization quotient often rely on the use of endocasts, but this method has many drawbacks. For example, endocasts do not provide any information regarding the internal organization of the brain. Furthermore, endocasts are often unclear in terms of the preservation of their boundaries, and it becomes hard to measure where exactly a certain structure starts and ends. If endocasts themselves are not reliable, then the value for brain size used to calculate the EQ could also be unreliable. Additionally, previous studies have suggested that Neanderthals have the same encephalization quotient as modern humans, although their post-crania suggests that they weighed more than modern humans. Because EQ relies on values from both postcrania and crania, the margin for error increases in relying on this proxy in paleo-neurology because of the inherent difficulty in obtaining accurate brain and body mass measurements from the fossil record.

== EQ of livestock animals ==
The EQ of livestock farm animals such as the domestic pig may be significantly lower than would suggest for their apparent intelligence. According to Minervini et al (2016) the brain of the domestic pig is a rather small size compared to the mass of the animal. The tremendous increase in body weight imposed by industrial farming significantly influences brain-to-body weight measures, including the EQ. The EQ of the domestic adult pig is just 0.38, yet pigs can use visual information seen in a mirror to find food, show evidence of self-recognition when presented with their reflections and there is evidence suggesting that pigs are as socially complex as many other highly intelligent animals, possibly sharing a number of cognitive capacities related to social complexity.

== History ==
The concept of encephalization has been a key evolutionary trend throughout human evolution, and consequently an important area of study. Over the course of hominin evolution, brain size has seen an overall increase from 400 cm^{3} to 1400 cm^{3}. Furthermore, the genus Homo is specifically defined by a significant increase in brain size. The earliest Homo species were larger in brain size as compared to contemporary Australopithecus counterparts, with which they co-inhabited parts of Eastern and Southern Africa.

Throughout modern history, humans have been fascinated by the large relative size of our brains, trying to connect brain sizes to overall levels of intelligence. Early brain studies were focused in the field of phrenology, which was pioneered by Franz Joseph Gall in 1796 and remained a prevalent discipline throughout the early 19th century. Specifically, phrenologists paid attention to the external morphology of the skull, trying to relate certain lumps to corresponding aspects of personality. They further measured physical brain size in order to equate larger brain sizes to greater levels of intelligence. Today, however, phrenology is considered a pseudoscience.

Among ancient Greek philosophers, Aristotle in particular believed that after the heart, the brain was the second most important organ of the body. He also focused on the size of the human brain, writing in 335 BCE that "of all the animals, man has the brain largest in proportion to his size." In 1861, French neurologist Paul Broca tried to make a connection between brain size and intelligence. Through observational studies, he noticed that people working in what he deemed to be more complex fields had larger brains than people working in less complex fields. Also, in 1871, Charles Darwin wrote in his book The Descent of Man: "No one, I presume, doubts that the large proportion which the size of man's brain bears to his body, compared to the same proportion in the gorilla or orang, is closely connected with his mental powers." (Note: See also Darwin, Charles (1874). "The Descent of Man, and Selection in Relation to Sex" (reprint ed.). p. 60. same quote as Darwin (1871) cited above, on p. 60 in online text of earlier reprint of second (1874) edition.) The concept of quantifying encephalization is also not a recent phenomenon. In 1889, Sir Francis Galton, through a study on college students, attempted to quantify the relationship between brain size and intelligence.

Due to the Nazi's racial policies before and during World War II, studies on brain size and intelligence temporarily gained a negative reputation, as they resemble the "Ubermensch" school of thought that enable the Holocaust. However, with the advent of imaging techniques such as the fMRI and PET scan, several scientific studies were launched to suggest a relationship between encephalization and advanced cognitive abilities. Harry J. Jerison, who invented the formula for encephalization quotient, believed that brain size was proportional to the ability of humans to process information. With this belief, a higher level of encephalization equated to a higher ability to process information. A larger brain could mean a number of different things, including a larger cerebral cortex, a greater number of neuronal associations, or a greater number of neurons overall.

== See also ==
- Brain–body mass ratio
- Brain development timelines
- Cephalization
- Cranial capacity
- Craniometry
- Evolutionary biology
- Human brain
- Human evolution
- Neuroscience and intelligence
- Phrenology
- Evolutionary neuroscience

== Bibliography ==
- Allman, John Morgan (1999). Evolving Brains. New York: Scientific American Library. ISBN 978-0-7167-5076-5.
- Foley, R.A; Lee, P.C; Widdowson, E. M.; Knight, C. D.; Jonxis, J. H. P. (1991). "Ecology and energies of encephalization in hominid evolution". Philosophical Transactions of the Royal Society of London. Series B: Biological Sciences. 334 (1270): 223–232. doi:10.1098/rstb.1991.0111. PMID 1685580.
- Jerison, Harry J. (January 1976). "Paleoneurology and the Evolution of Mind". Scientific American. 234 (1): 90–101. Bibcode:1976SciAm.234a..90J. doi:10.1038/scientificamerican0176-90. PMID 1251178.
- Russon, Ann E.; Begun, David R., eds. (2004). The Evolution of Thought: Evolutionary Origins of Great Ape Intelligence. Cambridge: Cambridge University Press. ISBN 978-0-521-78335-4.
- Tobias P.V. (1971). The Brain in Hominid Evolution. New York and London: Columbia University Press. ISBN 978-0-231-03518-7.
- Van Schaik, Carel (April 2006). "Why Are Some Animals So Smart?". Scientific American. 294 (4): 64–71. Bibcode:2006SciAm.294d..64V. doi:10.1038/scientificamerican0406-64. PMID 16596881. (Also cited in various publications as volume 16, issue 2, pp. 30–37. For example)
- Boddy, AM; McGowen, MR; Sherwood, CC; Grossman, LI; Goodman, M; Wildman, DE (May 2012). "Comparative analysis of encephalization in mammals reveals relaxed constraints on anthropoid primate and cetacean brain scaling". Journal of Evolutionary Biology. 25 (5): 981–94. Bibcode:2012JEBio..25..981B. doi:10.1111/j.1420-9101.2012.02491.x. PMID 22435703. S2CID 35368663.
- Dunbar R.I. (2007). "Evolution in the social brain". Science. 317 (5843). science magazine: 1344–1347. Bibcode:2007Sci...317.1344D. doi:10.1126/science.1145463. PMID 17823343. S2CID 1516792.
- Decasien, A.R. (2017). "Primate brain size is predicted by diet but not sociality". Nature. 1 (5) 0112: 112. Bibcode:2017NatEE...1..112D. doi:10.1038/s41559-017-0112. PMID 28812699. S2CID 205564046.
- Cairo O. (2011). "External measures of cognition". Frontiers in Human Neuroscience. 5: 108. doi:10.3389/fnhum.2011.00108. PMC 3207484. PMID 22065955.
- Herculano-Houzel S. (2017). The Human Advantage: How our brains became remarkable. Cambridge, MA: MIT Press. ISBN 978-0-262-53353-9.
