= Neuroscience and intelligence =

Neurological factors responsible for intelligence

Neuroscience and intelligence refers to the various neurological factors that are partly responsible for the variation of intelligence within species or between different species. A large amount of research in this area has been focused on the neural basis of human intelligence. Historic approaches to studying the neuroscience of intelligence consisted of correlating external head parameters, for example head circumference, to intelligence. Post-mortem measures of brain weight and brain volume have also been used. More recent methodologies focus on examining correlates of intelligence within the living brain using techniques such as magnetic resonance imaging (MRI), functional MRI (fMRI), electroencephalography (EEG), positron emission tomography and other non-invasive measures of brain structure and activity.

Researchers have been able to identify correlates of intelligence within the brain and its functioning. These include overall brain volume, grey matter volume, white matter volume, white matter integrity, cortical thickness and neural efficiency.

Analyses of the parameters of intellectual systems, patterns of their emergence and evolution, distinctive features, and the constants and limits of their structures and functions made it possible to measure and compare the capacity of communications (~100 m/s), to quantify the number of components in intellectual systems (~10^{11} neurons), and to calculate the number of successful links responsible for cooperation (~10^{14} synapses).

Although the evidence base for our understanding of the neural basis of human intelligence has increased greatly over the past 30 years, even more research is needed to fully understand it.

The neural basis of intelligence has also been examined in animals such as primates, cetaceans, and rodents.

== Humans ==
=== Brain volume ===
One of the main methods used to establish a relationship between intelligence and the brain is to use measures of brain volume. The earliest attempts at estimating brain volume were done using measures of external head parameters, such as head circumference as a proxy for brain size. More recent methodologies employed to study this relationship include post-mortem measures of brain weight and volume. These have their own limitations and strengths. The advent of MRI as a non-invasive highly-accurate measure of living brain structure and function (using fMRI) made this the pre-dominant and preferred method for measuring brain volume.

Overall, larger brain size and volume is associated with better cognitive functioning and higher intelligence. The specific regions that show the most robust correlation between volume and intelligence are the frontal, temporal and parietal lobes of the brain. A large number of studies have been conducted with uniformly positive correlations, leading to the generally safe conclusion that larger brains predict greater intelligence. In healthy adults, the correlation of total brain volume and IQ is approximately 0.4 when high-quality tests are used. A large scale study (n = 29k) using the UK Biobank found a correlation of .275. The strength of this relationship did not depend on sex, contradicting some earlier studies. A study using a sibling-design in two medium sized samples found evidence of causality with an effect size of .19. This study design rules out confounders that vary between families, but not those that vary within families.

Less is known about variation on scales less than total brain volume. A meta-analytic review by McDaniel found that the correlation between intelligence and in vivo brain size was larger for females (0.40) than for males (0.25). The same study also found that the correlation between brain size and Intelligence increased with age, with children showing smaller correlations. It has been suggested that the link between larger brain volumes and higher intelligence is related to variation in specific brain regions: a whole-brain measure would under-estimate these links. For functions more specific than general intelligence, regional effects may be more important. For instance evidence suggests that in adolescents learning new words, vocabulary growth is associated with gray matter density in bilateral posterior supramarginal gyri. Small studies have shown transient changes in gray-matter associated with developing a new physical skill (juggling) occipito-temporal cortex

Brain volume is not a perfect account of intelligence: the relationship explains a modest amount of variance in intelligence – 12% to 36% of the variance. The amount of variance explained by brain volume may also depend on the type of intelligence measured. Up to 36% of variance in verbal intelligence can be explained by brain volume, while only approximately 10% of variance in visuospatial intelligence can be explained by brain volume. A 2015 study by researcher Stuart J. Ritchie found that brain size explained 12% of the variance in intelligence among individuals. These caveats imply that there are other major factors influencing how intelligent an individual is apart from brain size. In a large meta-analysis consisting of 88 studies Pietschnig et al. (2015) estimated the correlation between brain volume and intelligence to be about correlation coefficient of 0.24 which equates to 6% variance. Taking into account measurement quality, and sample type and IQ-range, the meta-analytic association of brain volume in appears to be ~ .4 in normal adults. Researcher Jakob Pietschnig stated that "It is tempting to interpret this association in the context of human cognitive evolution and species differences in brain size and cognitive ability, we show that it is not warranted to interpret brain size as an isomorphic proxy of human intelligence differences".

=== Grey matter ===
Grey matter has been examined as a potential biological foundation for differences in intelligence. Similarly to brain volume, global grey matter volume is positively associated with intelligence. More specifically, higher intelligence has been associated with larger cortical grey matter in the prefrontal and posterior temporal cortex in adults. Furthermore, both verbal and nonverbal intelligence have been shown to be positively correlated with grey matter volume across the parietal, temporal and occipital lobes in young healthy adults, implying that intelligence is associated with a wide variety of structures within the brain.

There appear to be sex differences between the relationship of grey matter to intelligence between men and women. Men appear to show more intelligence to grey matter correlations in the frontal and parietal lobes, while the strongest correlations between intelligence and grey matter in women can be found in the frontal lobes and Broca's area. However, these differences do not seem to impact overall Intelligence, implying that the same cognitive ability levels can be attained in different ways.

One specific methodology used to study grey matter correlates of intelligence in areas of the brain is known as voxel-based morphometry (VBM). VBM allows researchers to specify areas of interest with great spatial resolution, allowing the examination of grey matter areas correlated with intelligence with greater special resolution. VBM has been used to correlate grey matter positively with intelligence in the frontal, temporal, parietal, and occipital lobes in healthy adults. VBM has also been used to show that grey matter volume in the medial region of the prefrontal cortex and the dorsomedial prefrontal cortex correlate positively with intelligence in a group of 55 healthy adults. VBM has also been successfully used to establish a positive correlation between grey matter volumes in the anterior cingulate and intelligence in children aged 5 to 18 years old.

Grey matter has also been shown to positively correlate with intelligence in children. Reis and colleagues have found that grey matter in the prefrontal cortex contributes most robustly to variance in Intelligence in children between 5 and 17, while subcortical grey matter is related to intelligence to a lesser extent. Frangou and colleagues examined the relationship between grey matter and intelligence in children and young adults aged between 12 and 21, and found that grey matter in the orbitofrontal cortex, cingulate gyrus, cerebellum and thalamus was positively correlated to intelligence, while grey matter in the caudate nucleus is negatively correlated with intelligence. However, the relationship between grey matter volume and intelligence only develops over time, as no significant positive relationship can be found between grey matter volume and intelligence in children under 11.

An underlying caveat to research into the relationship of grey matter volume and intelligence is demonstrated by the hypothesis of neural efficiency. The findings that more intelligent individuals are more efficient at using their neurons might indicate that the correlation of grey matter to intelligence reflects selective elimination of unused synapses, and thus a better brain circuitry.

=== White matter ===
Similar to grey matter, white matter has been shown to correlate positively with intelligence in humans. White matter consists mainly of myelinated neuronal axons, responsible for delivering signals between neurons. The pinkish-white color of white matter is actually a result of these myelin sheaths that electrically insulate neurons that are transmitting signals to other neurons. White matter connects different regions of grey matter in the cerebrum together. These interconnections make transport more seamless and allow us to perform tasks easier. Significant correlations between intelligence and the corpus callosum have been found, as larger callosal areas have been positively correlated with cognitive performance. However, there appear to be differences in importance for white matter between verbal and nonverbal intelligence, as although both verbal and nonverbal measures of intelligence correlate positively with the size of the corpus callosum, the correlation for intelligence and corpus callosum size was larger (.47) for nonverbal measures than that for verbal measures (.18). Anatomical mesh-based geometrical modelling has also shown positive correlations between the thickness of the corpus callosum and Intelligence in healthy adults.

White matter integrity has also been found to be related to intelligence. White matter tract integrity is important for information processing speed, and therefore reduced white matter integrity is related to lower intelligence. The effect of white matter integrity is mediate entirely through information processing speed. These findings indicate that the brain is structurally interconnected and that axonal fibres are integrally important for fast information process, and thus general intelligence.

Contradicting the findings described above, VBM failed to find a relationship between the corpus callosum and intelligence in healthy adults. This contradiction can be viewed to signify that the relationship between white matter volume and intelligence is not as robust as that of grey matter and intelligence.

=== Cortical thickness ===
Cortical thickness has also been found to correlate positively with intelligence in humans. However, the rate of growth of cortical thickness is also related to intelligence. In early childhood, cortical thickness displays a negative correlation with intelligence, while by late childhood this correlation has shifted to a positive one. More intelligent children were found to develop cortical thickness more steadily and over longer periods of time than less bright children. Studies have found cortical thickness to explain 5% in the variance of intelligence among individuals. In a study conducted to find associations between cortical thickness and general intelligence between different groups of people, sex did not play a role in intelligence. Although it is hard to pin intelligence on age based on cortical thickness due to different socioeconomic circumstances and education levels, older subjects (17 - 24) tended to have less variances in terms of intelligence than when compared to younger subjects (19 - 17).

=== Cortical convolution ===
The folding of the brain's surface, known as cortical convolution, has become more pronounced throughout human evolution. It has been suggested that this increased folding serves as a neurological foundation for some of the brain's most unique cognitive functions. As a result, the extent of cortical convolution may play a role in shaping individual intelligence within the human species.

An analysis published in 2019 found the contours of 677 children and adolescent (mean age 12.72 years) brains had a genetic correlation of almost 1 between IQ and surface area of the supramarginal gyrus on the left side of the brain.

=== Neural efficiency ===
The neural efficiency hypothesis postulates that more intelligent individuals display less activation in the brain during cognitive tasks, as measured by Glucose metabolism. A small sample of participants (N=8) displayed negative correlations between intelligence and absolute regional metabolic rates ranging from -0.48 to -0.84, as measured by PET scans, indicating that brighter individuals were more effective processors of information, as they use less energy. According to an extensive review by Neubauer & Fink a large number of studies (N=27) have confirmed this finding using methods such as PET scans, EEG and fMRI.

fMRI and EEG studies have revealed that task difficulty is an important factor affecting neural efficiency. More intelligent individuals display neural efficiency only when faced with tasks of subjectively easy to moderate difficulty, while no neural efficiency can be found during difficult tasks. In fact, more able individuals appear to invest more cortical resources in tasks of high difficulty. This appears to be especially true for the Prefrontal Cortex, as individuals with higher intelligence displayed increased activation of this area during difficult tasks compared to individuals with lower intelligence. It has been proposed that the main reason for the neural efficiency phenomenon could be that individuals with high intelligence are better at blocking out interfering information than individuals with low intelligence.

=== Further research ===
Some scientists prefer to look at more qualitative variables to relate to the size of measurable regions of known function, for example relating the size of the primary visual cortex to its corresponding functions, that of visual performance.

In a study of the head growth of 633 term-born children from the Avon Longitudinal Study of Parents and Children cohort, it was shown that prenatal growth and growth during infancy were associated with subsequent IQ. The study's conclusion was that the brain volume a child achieves by the age of 1 year helps determine later intelligence. Growth in brain volume after infancy may not compensate for poorer earlier growth.

There is an association between IQ and myopia. One suggested explanation is that one or several pleiotropic gene(s) affect the size of the neocortex part of the brain and eyes simultaneously.

==== Parieto-frontal integration theory ====
In 2007, Behavioral and Brain Sciences published a target article that put forth a biological model of intelligence based on 37 peer-reviewed neuroimaging studies (Jung & Haier, 2007). Their review of a wealth of data from functional imaging (functional magnetic resonance imaging and positron emission tomography) and structural imaging (diffusion MRI, voxel-based morphometry, in vivo magnetic resonance spectroscopy) argues that human intelligence arises from a distributed and integrated neural network comprising brain regions in the frontal and parietal lobes.

A recent lesion mapping study conducted by Barbey and colleagues provides evidence to support the P-FIT theory of intelligence.

Brain injuries at an early age isolated to one side of the brain typically results in relatively spared intellectual function and with IQ in the normal range.

== Primates ==
=== Brain size ===
Another theory of brain size in vertebrates is that it may relate to social rather than mechanical skills. Cortical size relates directly to pair-bonding lifestyle and among primates, cerebral cortex size varies directly with the demands of living in a large complex social network. Compared to other mammals, primates have significantly larger brain sizes. Additionally, most primates are found to be polygynandrous, having many social relationships with others. Although inconclusive, some studies have shown that this polygynandrous statue correlates to brain size.

Intelligence in chimpanzees has been found to be related to brain size, grey matter volume, and cortical thickness, as in humans.

== Health ==
Several environmental factors related to health can lead to significant cognitive impairment, particularly if they occur during pregnancy and childhood when the brain is growing and the blood–brain barrier is less effective. Developed nations have implemented several health policies regarding nutrients and toxins known to influence cognitive function. These include laws requiring fortification of certain food products and laws establishing safe levels of pollutants (e.g. lead, mercury, and organochlorides). Comprehensive policy recommendations targeting reduction of cognitive impairment in children have been proposed.

== See also ==
- Brain-to-body mass ratio
- Encephalization quotient
- General intelligence
- Impact of health on intelligence
- Neuropsychology
- fr:Noogenèse
- Outline of human intelligence
- Albert Einstein's brain
- Grey-matter degeneration
- List of animals by number of neurons
