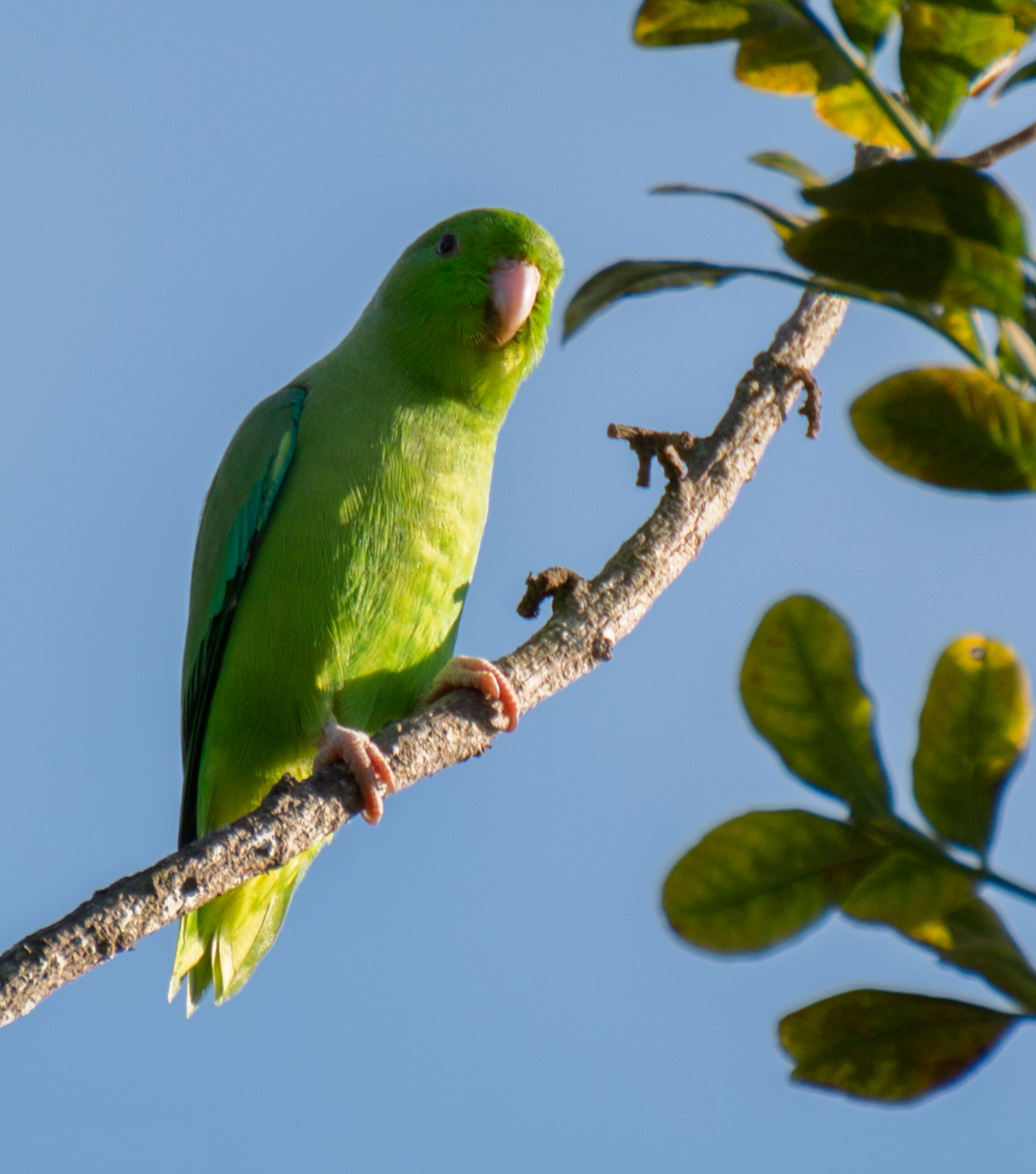

Conservation status
- Least Concern (IUCN 3.1)

Scientific classification
- Kingdom: Animalia
- Phylum: Chordata
- Class: Aves
- Order: Psittaciformes
- Family: Psittacidae
- Genus: Forpus
- Species: F. passerinus

Binomial name
- Forpus passerinus (Linnaeus, 1758)

Subspecies
- F. p. cyanophanes; F. p. viridissimus; F. p. cyanochlorus; F. p. deliciosus

Synonyms
- Psittacus passerinus Linnaeus, 1758

= Green-rumped parrotlet =

Species of bird

The green-rumped parrotlet (Forpus passerinus), also known as the green-rumped parakeet, is a species of parrot in the family Psittacidae that is found in northeastern South America and the Caribbean island of Trinidad. The green-rumped parrotlet occurs from northern Venezuela eastwards to the lower Amazon in Brazil, Also Suriname and has been introduced to Curaçao, Jamaica and Barbados. It prefers semi-open lowland areas and is also sometimes present in city parks. There are five subspecies.

== Taxonomy ==
The green-rumped parrotlet was formally described in 1758 by the Swedish naturalist Carl Linnaeus in the tenth edition of his Systema Naturae. He placed it with all the other parrots in the genus Psittacus and coined the binomial name Psittacus passerinus. Linnaeus specified the type location as "America", but this was changed to Surinam by Hans von Berlepsch in 1908. The green-rumped parrotlet is now one of nine species placed in the genus Forpus that was introduced in 1858 by the German zoologist Friedrich Boie. The etymology of the genus name is uncertain. The specific epithet passerinus is from Latin and means "sparrow-like".

Five subspecies are recognised:

- F. p. cyanophanes (Todd, 1915) – north Colombia
- F. p. viridissimus (Lafresnaye, 1848) – north Venezuela, Trinidad and Tobago
- F. p. passerinus (Linnaeus, 1758) – the Guianas
- F. p. cyanochlorus (Schlegel, 1864) – Roraima (north Brazil)
- F. p. deliciosus (Ridgway, 1888) – lower Amazonian Brazil

== Description ==
The green-rumped parrotlet is 12 cm (4.7 in) long and weighs 20–28 g (0.71–0.99 oz). The plumage mainly bright green with duller/grayer napes. The eyes are dark brown and beaks and feet are light peach. Green-rumped parrotlets exhibit sexual dimorphism: males have purplish-blue primaries, secondaries, and coverts, with bright turquoise feathers on the leading edges of their wings; females lack blue but have more yellow-green on the head. Like all parrots, green-rumped parrotlets exhibit zygodactyly, meaning two toes face forward and two face backward. Juveniles look like adults.

The male of subspecies F. p. cyanophanes has more extensive purple-blue markings that form an obvious patch on the closed wing. The male of F. p. viridissimus has darker purple-blue markings on the secondaries. The male of F. p. cyanochlorus has darker purple-blue markings than the nominate species; the female is brighter yellow-green. The male of F. p. deliciosus compared to the nominate has the back and rump that is brighter emerald green that is tinted with pale blue; the primaries and secondaries pale blue with purple-blue near feather shafts. The forehead of the female is more yellow.

== Distribution and habitat ==
Green-rumped parrotlets are found in tropical South America, from the Caribbean regions of Colombia, Venezuela and Trinidad south and east to the Guianas and Brazil on the lower Amazon River. It has been introduced in Jamaica, Curaçao, Barbados and Tobago, and was not recorded on Trinidad prior to 1916. Along with the lilac-tailed parrotlet (Touit batavicus), they are the only parrotlet species to occur in the West Indies.

Green-rumped parrotlets are fairly common in open, semi-arid habitat and are found residing in dry scrubland, deciduous woodland, gallery forest, farmland, forest edges, and deforested areas throughout their range. While they are non-migratory, they may wander locally to locate sources of food. They are not found at altitudes greater than 1,800 metres (5,900 ft) above sea level.

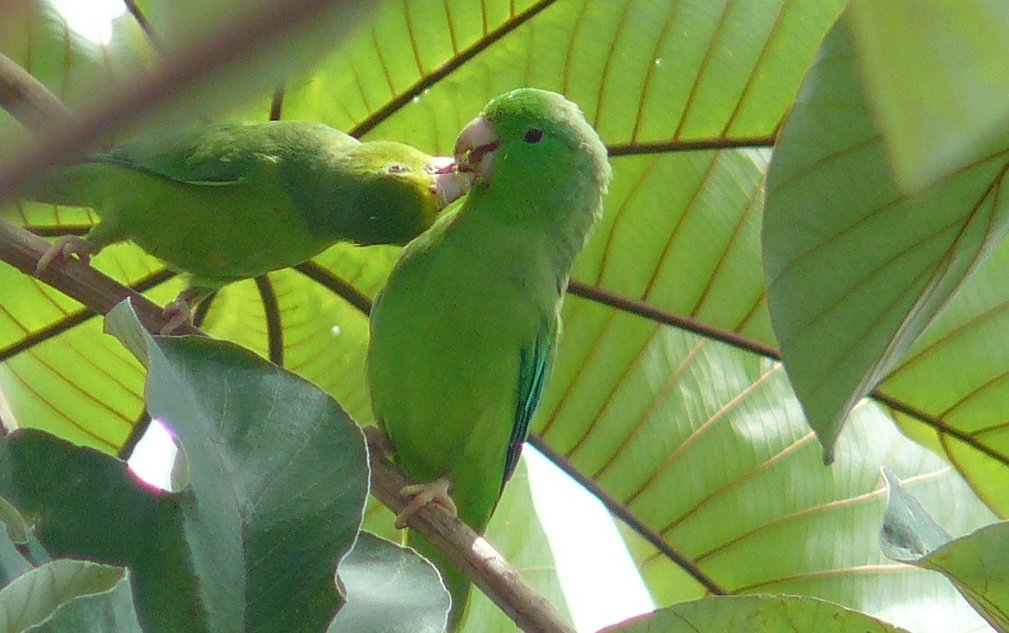
Male (right) and female (left) green-rumped parrotlets socializing and feeding in Venezuela

== Conservation ==
The global population size is not known, but this species has been described as widespread and common. However, there is strong evidence that populations are decreasing, which is likely related to habitat destruction by deforestation. The species has been classified as Least Concern by the IUCN Red List.

== Behavior and ecology ==
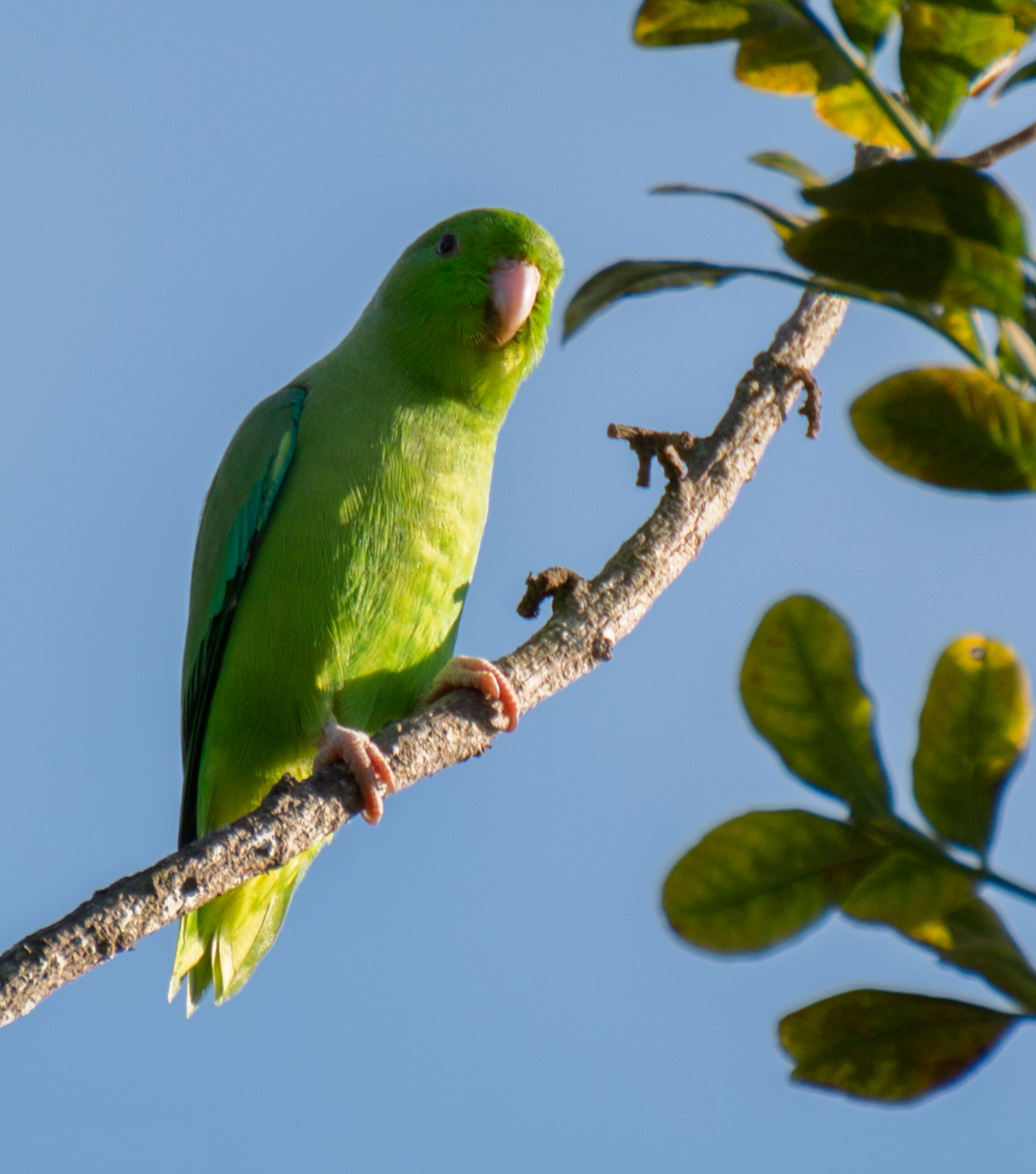
Green-rumped parrotlet in Trinidad

=== Social ===
Green-rumped parrotlets are very gregarious and roost communally; they are often seen in flocks of up to 100 individuals.

Green-rumped parrotlets make light, twittering calls. While in flocks, calls are louder and more penetrating. Contact calls, similar to names, are individually distinct and are used for individual mate recognition. Each call varies in duration, frequency, and pitch.

Green-rumped parrotlets have been observed in flocks consisting of combinations of breeding male-female pairs, nonbreeding male-female pairs, male-male pairs, and individual nonbreeding males; the number of each type depends on the season. Extra-pair copulation is relatively uncommon (less than 8% of young are conceived through extra-pair fertilization).

=== Reproduction ===
Green-rumped parrotlets form strong pair bonds and rarely switch mates, but typically only breed with the same individual for 1–2 seasons. Widowed parrotlets will often take a new mate, and 48% of the new stepparents adopt the offspring. Stepfather parrotlets in particular nest with their new mates, attaining earlier ages at first breeding than competitors (stepmother-widower pair sample sizes were too small to produce results, at only 15 pairs). Therefore, adoption appears to be sexually selected. However, so is infanticide by stepfathers.

Almost half of wild females attempt a second brood during their breeding season. Green-rumped parrotlets breed during the rainy season (May–November), though each subspecies tends to breed during different months. They typically make their nests in unlined tree cavities, holes found in arboreal termite nests, or in cavities in wooden fence posts. Intense competition over limited nest sites has selected for marauding non-breeding pairs that attempt to usurp occupied nests and evict the abandoned offspring.

The female lays 5–6 small white eggs over a period of 9–16 days. The female usually initiates incubation after the first egg is laid, leading to asynchronous hatching which begins 18–22 days after the start of incubation. Depending on the clutch size, hatching concludes 2–14 days after the first egg hatches. Fledging occurs 29–35 days after hatching, with the clutch fledging over a period of 14 days on average.

The unusual length of the green-rumped parrotlet's nestling period is believed to be caused, or at least influenced, by the low levels of available nutrients and minerals for young found in typical green-rumped parrotlet habitat. Because of the difference in hatching time, not all chicks are the same size when they are young. Research has been done on resource allocation between different chick sizes by green-rumped parrotlet parents. It was shown that male parents tend to feed larger chicks more often, while females are far more likely to feed smaller individuals first because of their begging habits - smaller chicks tend to beg more, while larger chicks are more submissive. This effect has also been observed in other parrot species.

Research has shown that by planning asynchronous hatching, parent parrotlets don't have to spend as much time expending the high levels of energy associated with brooding, but the amount of energy expended does not change.

It has been observed that over the course of mating and raising a brood of chicks, a female green-rumped parrotlet's mass varies greatly. Female individuals gained up to 25% more mass before laying and maintained this mass through incubation until hatching began. The amount of mass lost over the brooding and fledging periods was dependent on the size of the brood. It is believed that this mass change is caused by a combination of brooding starvation, adaptation to a new lifestyle, and sexual activity.

=== Diet ===
Green-rumped parrotlets primarily eat seeds from grasses and forbs, as well as flowers, buds, berries, and fruits. They have also been observed to eat the seeds from fruit trees including Annona sp. and guava.

== Aviculture ==
Green-rumped parrotlets are bred in captivity and kept as pets, though they are less common than some other Forpus species. Imports of wild green-rumped parrotlets into the United States are prohibited under the Wild Bird Conservation Act and international trade is limited by other laws, so aviculture is dependent on existing captive populations.

== Related books and articles ==
- Birds of Venezuela by Hilty, ISBN 0-7136-6418-5
- ffrench, Richard (1991). A Guide to the Birds of Trinidad and Tobago (2nd ed.). Comstock Publishing. ISBN 978-0-8014-9792-6.
