= Cyrtodactylus irianjayaensis =

Conservation status
- Data Deficient (IUCN 3.1)

Scientific classification
- Kingdom: Animalia
- Phylum: Chordata
- Class: Reptilia
- Order: Squamata
- Suborder: Gekkota
- Family: Gekkonidae
- Genus: Cyrtodactylus
- Species: C. irianjayaensis

Binomial name
- Cyrtodactylus irianjayaensis Rösler, 2001
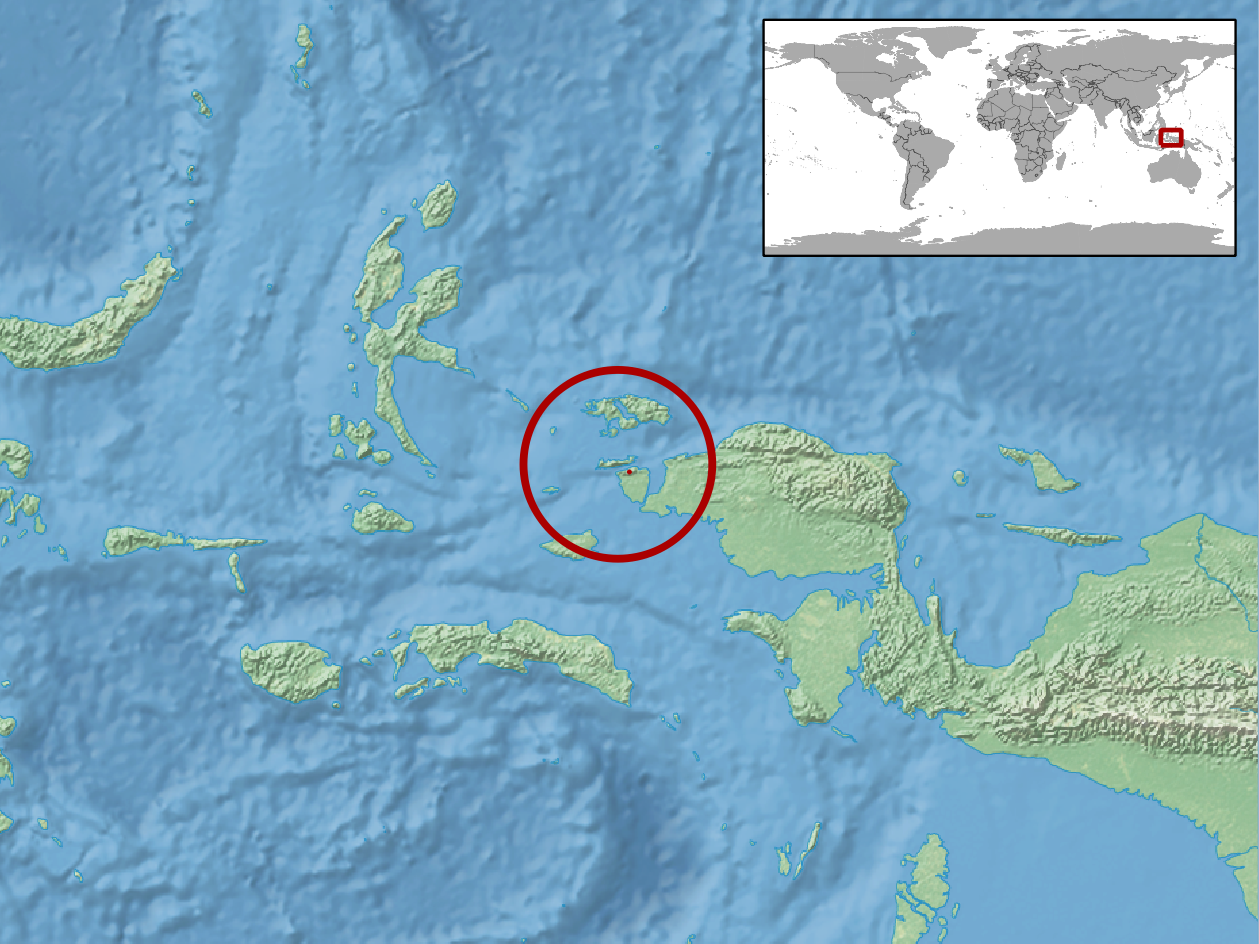

Species of lizard

Cyrtodactylus irianjayaensis is a species of gecko that is endemic to Papua New Guinea.
