= Brain–body mass ratio =

Measurement used for rough estimate of the intelligence of an animal

Brain–body mass ratio, also known as the brain–body weight ratio, is the ratio of brain mass to body mass, which is hypothesized to be a rough estimate of the intelligence of an animal, although fairly inaccurate in many cases. A more complex measurement, encephalization quotient, takes into account allometric effects of widely divergent body sizes across several taxa. The raw brain-to-body mass ratio is however simpler to come by, and is still a useful tool for comparing encephalization within species or between fairly closely related species.

== Brain–body size relationship ==
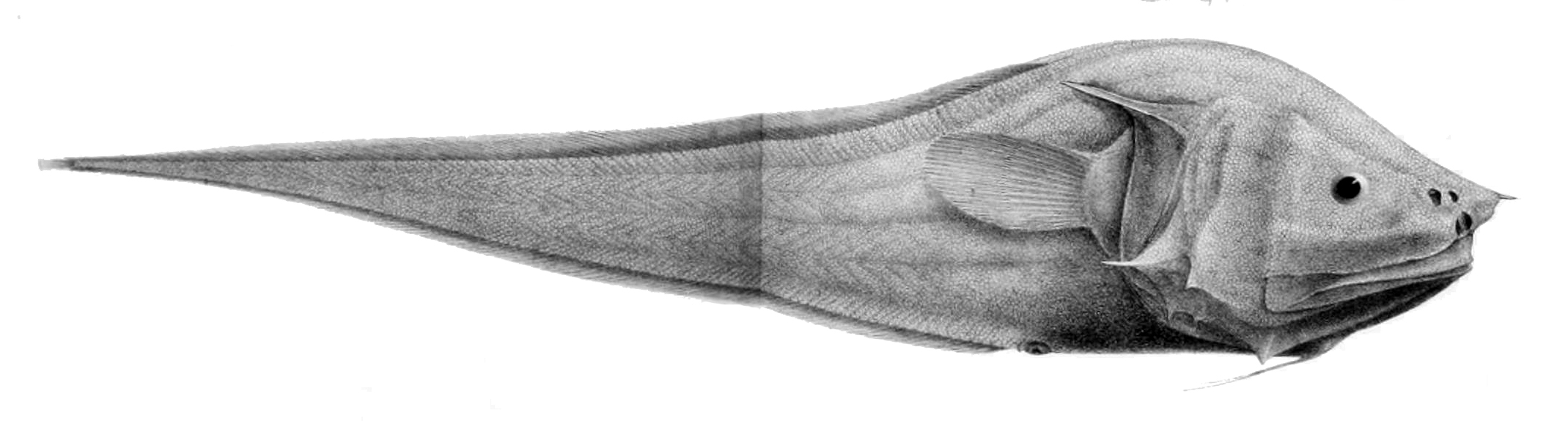
The bony-eared assfish brain has been measured as small as 6 milligrams.

Brain size usually increases with body size in animals (i.e. large animals usually have larger brains than smaller animals); the relationship is not, however, linear. Small mammals such as mice may have a brain/body ratio similar to humans, while elephants have a comparatively lower brain/body ratio.

In animals, it is thought that the larger the brain, the more brain weight will be available for more complex cognitive tasks. However, large animals need more neurons to represent their own bodies and control specific muscles; thus, relative rather than absolute brain size makes for a ranking of animals that better coincides with the observed complexity of animal behaviour. The relationship between brain-to-body mass ratio and complexity of behaviour is not perfect as other factors also influence intelligence, such as the evolution of the recent cerebral cortex and different degrees of brain folding, which increase the surface of the cortex, which is positively correlated in humans to intelligence. A notable exception to this is swelling of the brain which, whilst nominally resulting in greater surface area, does not alter the intelligence of those suffering from it.

=== Relation to metabolism ===
The relationship between brain weight and body weight of all living vertebrates follows two completely separate linear functions for cold-blooded and warm-blooded animals. Cold-blooded vertebrates have much smaller brains than warm-blooded vertebrates of the same size. However, if brain metabolism is taken into account, the brain-to-body relationship of both warm and cold-blooded vertebrates becomes similar, with most using between 2 and 8 percent of their basal metabolism for the brain and spinal cord.

== Comparisons between groups ==
Species	Brain:body mass ratio (E:S)
Small ants	1:7
Tree shrew	1:10
Small birds	1:12
Elephantfish	1:32
Mouse	1:40
Human	1:40
Cat	1:100
Dog	1:125
Frog	1:172
Lion	1:550
Elephant	1:560
Horse	1:600
Shark	1:2496
Hippopotamus	1:2789

Dolphins have the highest brain-to-body weight ratio of all cetaceans. Monitor lizards, tegus and anoles and some tortoise species have the largest among reptiles. Among birds, the highest brain-to-body ratios are found among parrots, crows, magpies, jays and ravens. Among amphibians, the studies are still limited. Either octopuses or jumping spiders have some of the highest for an invertebrate, although some ant species have 14–15% of their mass in their brains, the highest value known for any animal. Sharks have one of the highest for fish alongside manta rays (although the electrogenic elephantfish has a ratio nearly 80 times higher –about 1/32, which is slightly higher than that for humans). Treeshrews have a higher brain to body mass ratio than any other mammal, including humans. Treeshrews hold about 10% of their body mass in their brain.

Generally speaking, the larger the animal, the smaller the brain-to-body mass ratio is. Thus, large whales have very small brains compared to their weight, and small rodents like mice have a relatively large brain, giving a brain-to-body mass ratio similar to humans. One explanation could be that as an animal's brain gets larger, the size of the neural cells remains the same, and more nerve cells will cause the brain to increase in size to a lesser degree than the rest of the body. This phenomenon can be described by an equation of the form E = CS^{r}, where E and S are brain and body weights, r a constant that depends on animal family (but close to 2/3 in many vertebrates), and C is the cephalization factor.

It has been argued that the animal's ecological niche, rather than its evolutionary family, is the main determinant of its encephalization factor C. In the essay "Bligh's Bounty", Stephen Jay Gould noted that if one looks at vertebrates with very low encephalization quotient, their brains are slightly less massive than their spinal cords. Theoretically, intelligence might correlate with the absolute amount of brain an animal has after subtracting the weight of the spinal cord from the brain. This formula is useless for invertebrates because they do not have spinal cords, or in some cases, central nervous systems.

== Criticism ==
Recent research indicates that, in non-human primates, whole brain size is a better measure of cognitive abilities than brain-to-body mass ratio. The total weight of the species is greater than the predicted sample only if the frontal lobe is adjusted for spatial relation. The brain-to-body mass ratio was however found to be an excellent predictor of variation in problem solving abilities among carnivoran mammals.

In humans, the brain to body weight ratio can vary greatly from person to person; it would be much higher in an underweight person than an overweight person, and higher in infants than adults. The same problem is encountered when dealing with marine mammals, which may have considerable body fat masses. Some researchers therefore prefer lean body weight to brain mass as a better predictor.

== See also ==
- Cranial capacity
- Craniometry
- Encephalization quotient
- List of animals by number of neurons
- Phrenology
- Schauenberg's index
