= John Lorber =

English paediatrician

John Lorber (1915–1996) was a professor of paediatrics at the University of Sheffield from 1979 until his retirement in 1981. He worked at the Children's Hospital of Sheffield, where he specialized in work on spina bifida. He also wrote on the subject of medical ethics regarding the use of intensive medical intervention for severely handicapped infants.

== Medical ethics and neonatal surgical intervention ==
In the 1970s, Lorber was one of the early advocates for neonatal surgical intervention in cases of the Myelomeningocele form of spina bifida. Lorber's published work advocating treatments, along with the opposing views of Raymond Duff and A. G. M. Campbell, became important voices in the debate about the ethics of withholding medical care. However, by the mid 1980s, Lorber's position had changed based on the unsatisfactory long term outcomes and instead he supported a treatment of normal nursing, with care to avoid pain and discomfort. This position was criticized by pro-life groups.

== Is Your Brain Really Necessary? ==
In 1980, Roger Lewin published an article in Science, "Is Your Brain Really Necessary?", about Lorber studies on cerebral cortex losses. He included a report by Lorber, never published in any scientific journal, about the case of a Sheffield University student who had a measured IQ of 126 and passed a Mathematics Degree but who had hardly any discernible brain matter at all since his cortex was extremely reduced by hydrocephalus. The article led to the broadcast of a Yorkshire Television documentary of the same title, though it was about a different patient who had normal brain mass distributed strangely in a very large skull. Explanations have been proposed for the first student's situation, with reviewers noting that Lorber's scans evidenced that the subject's brain mass was not absent, but compacted into the small space available, possibly compressed to a greater density than regular brain tissue.
