= Tenuicricetodon =

Tenuicricetodon Temporal range: Early Oligocene

Scientific classification
- Kingdom: Animalia
- Phylum: Chordata
- Class: Mammalia
- Infraclass: Placentalia
- Order: Rodentia
- Family: Cricetidae
- Subfamily: †Eucricetodontinae
- Genus: †Tenuicricetodon; Maridet et al., 2025
- Species: †T. arcemis

Binomial name
- †Tenuicricetodon arcemis Maridet et al., 2025

Extinct genus of cricetid rodent

Tenuicricetodon is an extinct genus of cricetid rodent belonging to the subfamily Eucricetodontinae that lived during the Rupelian stage of the Oligocene epoch.

== Distribution ==
Tenuicricetodon arcemis is known from fossils found in Early Oligocene deposits in Romania.
