= Isterlestes =

Isterlestes Temporal range: Late Miocene

Scientific classification
- Kingdom: Animalia
- Phylum: Chordata
- Class: Mammalia
- Infraclass: Placentalia
- Order: Eulipotyphla
- Family: Soricidae
- Genus: †Isterlestes
- Species: †I. aenigmaticus

Binomial name
- †Isterlestes aenigmaticus Cailleux et al., 2025

Extinct genus of mammals

Isterlestes is an extinct genus of soricid that lived during the Late Miocene.

== Distribution ==
Isterlestes aenigmaticus is known from Slovakia.
