= AL 333 =

Hominin fossil

The First Family
- Catalog no.: AL 333
- Common name: The First Family
- Age: 3.2 million years
- Place discovered: Hadar, Ethiopia
- Date discovered: 1975
- Discovered by: Donald Johanson

AL 333, commonly referred to as the "First Family", is a collection of prehistoric hominid teeth and bones. Discovered in 1975 by Donald Johanson's team in Hadar, Ethiopia, the "First Family" is estimated to be about 3.2 million years old and consists of the remains of at least thirteen individuals of different ages. They are generally thought to be members of the species Australopithecus afarensis. There are multiple theories about the hominids' cause of death and some debate over their species and sexual dimorphism.

== Discovery ==
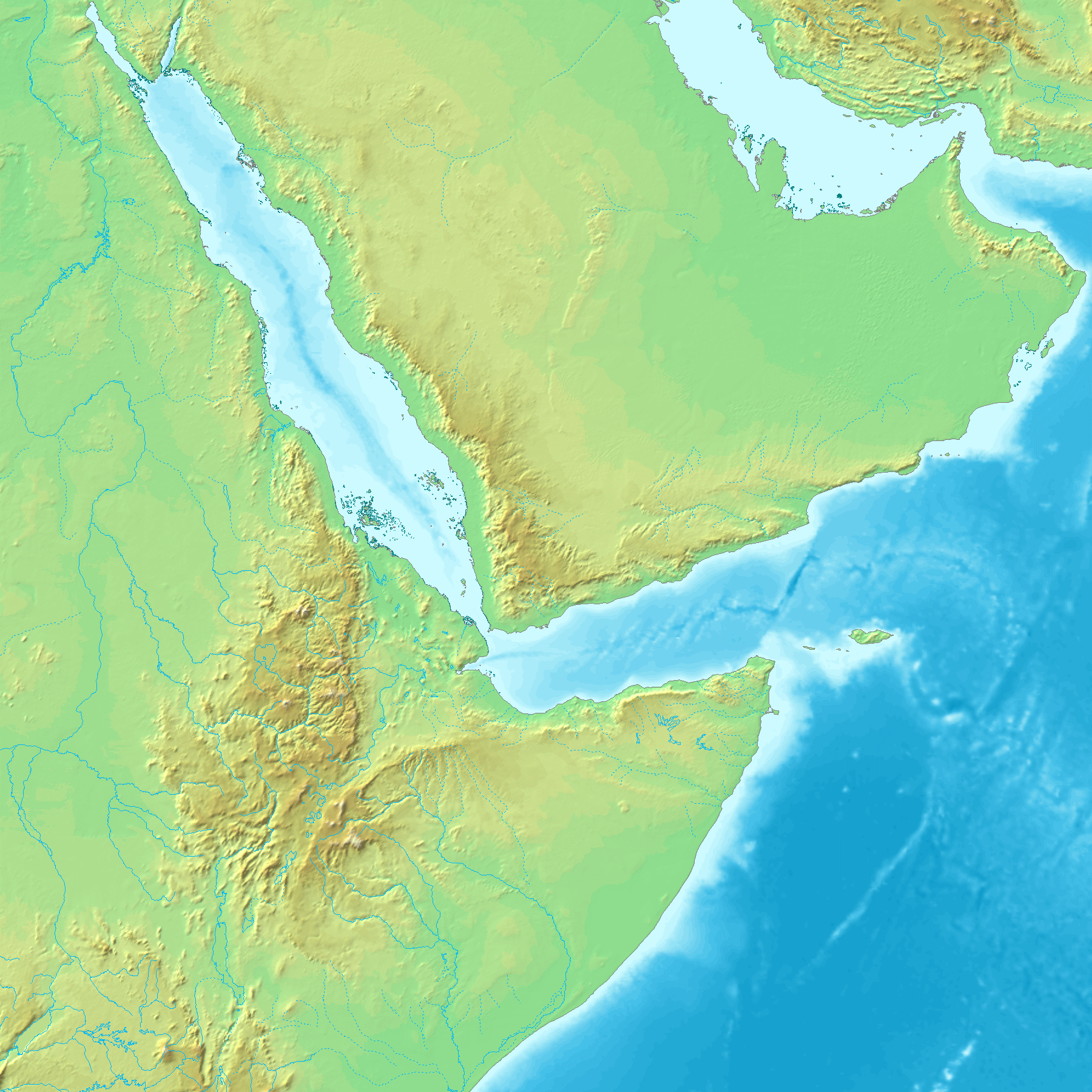
Topographic map showing the Afar Triangle

In the late 1960s, French paleoanthropologist Maurice Taieb began geological exploration of the Afar Triangle, a relatively unexplored area in northern Ethiopia. Also known as the Danakil Depression, this triangular region contains the lowest point in Ethiopia and one of the lowest in Africa. In 1972, Taieb invited Yves Coppens, a French paleontologist, Jon Kalb, an American geologist, and Donald Johanson, an American anthropologist, to survey the region to appraise its field exploration potential. They decided to work in the Hadar Formation, a sedimentary geological formation within the region. The four men established the International Afar Research Expedition (IARE), with Johanson in charge of the paleoanthropology aspect of the expedition.

Historically, the Afar Triangle had been unexplored due to its remoteness and inhospitable nature. The IARE, however, chose the region for specific reasons. The geological sequence of the Hadar Formation includes nearly 200 meters of rock layers (strata), spanning a significant geological period. The sediment was also rich in fossils, often preserving partial skeletons of animals, suggesting the potential for recovering well-preserved and more complete hominid fossils. Furthermore, the area contained feldspars and volcanic glass valuable for chronometric dating.

From 1973 to 1977, IARE expeditions resulted in the discovery of approximately 250 hominid fossils. The most famous Hadar discovery is Lucy, the most complete A. afarensis skeleton found to date. However, in 1975, numerous remains were also discovered at another site within the formation, AL 333. These remains became known as the "First Family" and represent at least thirteen distinct individuals, including both adults and children. The recovery of these 216 hominid specimens is significant in African paleoanthropology because their close proximity suggests these individuals may have lived in a group or been part of the same family.

== Characteristics of findings ==
Of the initial 216 specimens, 197 were surface finds, and 19 were found within 80 cm of the surface, suggesting they died around the same time. Further visits to AL 333 led to the discovery of 23 additional postcranial and 3 mandibular and dental specimens. This increased the estimated number of individuals from 13 to at least 17 (9 adults, 3 adolescents, and 5 young children). The fossils showed minimal weathering.

In 2000, a complete fossil of the fourth metatarsal was recovered from AL 333. The morphology of this bone suggests that A. afarensis had transverse and longitudinal foot arches, indicating a bipedal gait similar to that of modern humans.

== Dating ==
The close proximity of all fossils at AL 333 within a single geological stratum strongly suggests they died at approximately the same time. Absolute dating methods were used to determine this time more precisely. As the specimens were found between two layers of volcanic ash, potassium-argon dating was employed. This method measures the ratio of radioactive potassium to its decay product, argon, and is ideal for dating volcanic material. For AL 333, potassium-argon dating yielded an age of 3.18–3.21 million years.

== Debate ==
=== Cause of death ===
The unique grouping of such a large number of individuals in the same place at virtually the same time has led to significant speculation regarding the cause of death. One early theory was a flash flood, but detailed study of the site's geological formation has largely discredited this idea. An alternative theory is predation by large cats. This is partially supported by the absence of certain bone types and possible damage to the fossils consistent with a carnivore. However, the interpretation of fossil damage as evidence of predation is disputed. If predation was the cause, it might imply that the bodies were accumulated at the site rather than all individuals being killed simultaneously. Another suggested theory was food poisoning, but Johanson questioned this given the hominids' likely vegetarian diet.

=== Species ===
Debate exists within the archaeological community regarding whether the "First Family" fossils belong to a single species. While the presence of thirteen individuals from the same time period suggests they are of the same species, some researchers consider this a potential coincidence.

To address this debate, archaeologists have extensively studied bone size. The sizes of the largest recovered bones, such as humeri and femora, were compared. Although different bones were measured, these measurements could be used to estimate the size of the femoral head. These estimates were then compared to the femoral head of Lucy. Researchers concluded that, like Lucy, the fossils likely belong to the species Australopithecus afarensis.

=== Sexual dimorphism ===
Once the AL 333 individuals were tentatively identified as belonging to a single species, they became valuable for studying sexual dimorphism. Although the fossils predominantly consist of jaws and teeth, the few recovered humeri and femora allowed for potential differentiation between males and females. Early analyses produced results that varied from previous assumptions. Some initial tests suggested that A. afarensis exhibited dimorphism similar to modern humans. During these early analyses, it was presumed that the fossils represented a mix of males and females. However, some paleoanthropologists disagree, arguing that while bone size varies at AL 333, the variation is due to age rather than sex. To provide further insight into the sexual dimorphism of A. afarensis, the AL 333 fossil bones were compared to remains of known females from other sites. These comparative studies indicated a level of sexual dimorphism comparable to gorillas, meaning males were significantly larger than females.
