= AL 129-1 =

Hominin fossil

Johanson's Knee
- Catalog no.: AL 129-1
- Common name: Johanson's Knee
- Species: Australopithecus afarensis
- Age: 3.4 mya
- Place discovered: Hadar, Ethiopia
- Date discovered: 1973
- Discovered by: Donald Johanson

AL 129-1 is a fossilized knee joint of the species Australopithecus afarensis. It was discovered in Hadar, Ethiopia by Donald Johanson in November 1973.

It is estimated to be 3.4 million years old. Its characteristics include an elliptical Lateral condyle and an oblique femoral shaft like that found in humans, indicating bipedalism.

== Discovery ==
French geologist Maurice Taieb discovered the Hadar Formation in 1968. He then formed the IARE, inviting notably Johanson, an American anthropologist and founding director of the Institute of Human Origins of Arizona State University; Jon Kalb, an American geologist; and Yves Coppens, a French-born paleontologist now based at the Collège de France, to co-direct the research. An expedition was formed with four American and seven French participants, and in the fall of 1973 the team surveyed Hadar, Ethiopia for fossils and artifacts related to the origin of humans.

They found numerous fossils, but at first no hominids. Then, in November 1973, near the end of the first field season, Johanson tapped a fossil fragment he thought was a hippopotamus rib. He found that it was actually a fossil of a proximal tibia, the upper end of a shinbone. From its small size, he thought it was a monkey, and decided to collect it. While he was writing it up, he noticed a few yards away a distal femur, the lower end of a thighbone. This was split between the condyles, or lumps making the knee joint.

The other condyle lay next to it, and when he fitted them together and to the proximal tibia, the angle that the femur and tibia formed at the knee joint clearly showed that this was an upright walking hominid. This angular joint was in contrast to an ape, which has the femur and tibia forming a straight line. Tom Gray walked up, and when shown the tibia on its own, thought it was a monkey, but when shown the angle formed with the tibia, agreed that this was from a hominid.

This was an immensely important find, as it would be the first showing upright walking hominids from 3.4 million years ago. On the day after finding the fossil Johanson was beginning to doubt his certainty, and there was an urgent need for confirmation as their agreement with the Ethiopian government required his team to describe the finds at a press conference before it left. He did not want to botch his first important fossil interpretation, but he would not be allowed to take the fossil away for study unless he gave a description. That second evening he remembered a nearby ruin of an Afar burial mound. Comparison of the fossil finds with modern bones exposed by the collapsed side of the mound showed that, except for size, the bones were indeed virtually identical.

The team returned for the second field season in the following year and found hominid jaws. Then, on the morning of November 24, 1974, Johanson and Gray were searching in a gully about two and a half kilometres from the site where the knee joint had been discovered, where Johanson found the first fossil fragment of Lucy (Australopithecus).

== See also ==
- List of fossil sites (with link directory)
- List of hominina (hominid) fossils (with images)
