= LH 4 =

Hominin fossil

Laetoli Hominid 4
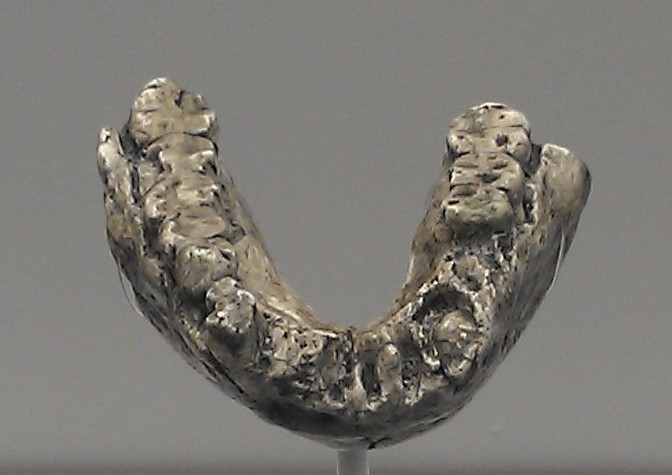
- Catalog no.: LH 4
- Common name: Laetoli Hominid 4
- Species: Australopithecus afarensis
- Age: 3.4 million years
- Place discovered: Arusha, Tanzania
- Date discovered: 1974
- Discovered by: Mary Leakey

LH 4 or Laetoli Hominid 4 is the catalogue number of a fossilized mandible which was discovered by Mary Leakey in 1974 from Laetoli, Tanzania.

Mary Leakey and her team, including Tim White, found between 1974 and 1977 42 hominid teeth associated with a jawbone. One of them was LH-4, a fine specimen with nine teeth. White described the fossils, and LH-4 was assigned as the "name-bearer" of the new species Australopithecus afarensis by Donald Johanson and Tim White.

== Observations ==
The specimen is 2.9–3.9 million years old and is mandible of an adult Australopithecus afarensis with all molars present and a fairly large canine. Most anterior teeth and rami are missing, but the dental arcade is in a good condition with little or no evidence of distortion.

== Bibliography ==
- Clarke, Ronald J. (2012). "The history of research in human evolution in Africa and what lessons have been learned". Human origin sites and the World Heritage Convention in Africa. UNESCO. p. 254. ISBN 9789230010812.
