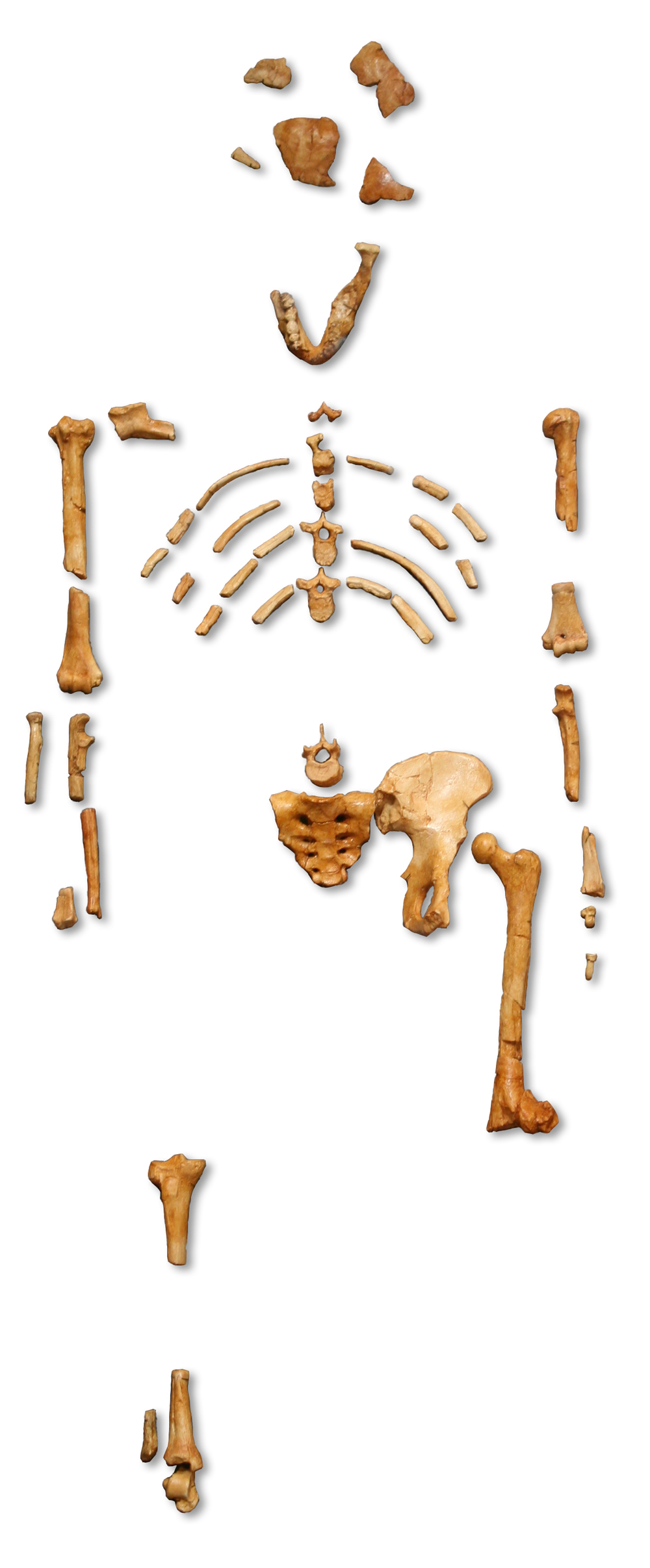
- The partial skeleton AL 288-1 ("Lucy")

Scientific classification
- Kingdom: Animalia
- Phylum: Chordata
- Class: Mammalia
- Order: Primates
- Superfamily: Hominoidea
- Family: Hominidae
- Genus: †Australopithecus
- Species: †A. afarensis

Binomial name
- †Australopithecus afarensis Johanson, White, and Coppens, 1978

Synonyms
- Synonyms: Praeanthropus africanus (Weinert, 1950); Australopithecus aethiopicus Tobias, 1980; Homo aethiopicus (Tobias, 1980); Homo antiquus Ferguson, 1984; Afaranthropus antiquus (Ferguson, 1984); Homo hadar Bonde and Westergaard, 2004; A. bahrelghazali? Brunet et al., 1996; A. deyiremeda? Haile-Selassie et al., 2015

= Australopithecus afarensis =

Australopithecus afarensis Temporal range: Zanclean – Piacenzian 3.9–2.9 Ma

Extinct hominid from the Pliocene of East Africa

Australopithecus afarensis is an extinct species of australopithecine which lived from about 3.9–2.9 million years ago (mya) in the Pliocene of East Africa. The first fossils were discovered in the 1930s, but major fossil finds would not take place until the 1970s. From 1972 to 1977, the International Afar Research Expedition—led by anthropologists Maurice Taieb, Donald Johanson and Yves Coppens—unearthed several hundreds of hominin specimens in Hadar, Afar Region, Ethiopia, the most significant being the exceedingly well-preserved skeleton AL 288-1 ("Lucy") and the site AL 333 ("the First Family"). Beginning in 1974, Mary Leakey led an expedition into Laetoli, Tanzania, and notably recovered fossil trackways. In 1978, the species was first described, but this was followed by arguments for splitting the wealth of specimens into different species given the wide range of variation which had been attributed to sexual dimorphism (normal differences between males and females). A. afarensis probably descended from A. anamensis and is hypothesised to have given rise to Homo, though the latter is debated.

A. afarensis had a tall face, a delicate brow ridge, and prognathism (the jaw jutted outwards). The jawbone was quite robust, similar to that of gorillas. The living size of A. afarensis is debated, with arguments for and against marked size differences between males and females. Lucy measured perhaps 105 cm (3 ft 5 in) in height and 25–37 kg (55–82 lb), but she was rather small for her species. In contrast, a presumed male was estimated at 165 cm (5 ft 5 in) and 45 kg (99 lb). A perceived difference in male and female size may simply be sampling bias. The leg bones as well as the Laetoli fossil trackways suggest A. afarensis was a competent biped, though somewhat less efficient at walking and slower at running than humans. The arm and shoulder bones have some similar aspects to those of orangutans and gorillas, which has variously been interpreted as either evidence of partial tree-dwelling (arboreality), or basal traits inherited from the chimpanzee–human last common ancestor with no adaptive functionality.

A. afarensis was probably a generalist omnivore of both C_{3} forest plants and C_{4} CAM savanna plants—and perhaps creatures which ate such plants—and was able to exploit a variety of different food sources. Similarly, A. afarensis appears to have inhabited a wide range of habitats with no real preference, inhabiting open grasslands or woodlands, shrublands, and lake- or riverside forests. Potential evidence of stone tool use would indicate meat was also a dietary component. Marked sexual dimorphism in primates typically corresponds to a polygynous society and low dimorphism to monogamy, but the group dynamics of early hominins is difficult to predict with accuracy. Early hominins may have fallen prey to the large carnivores of the time, such as big cats and hyenas.

== Taxonomy ==
=== Research history ===
Beginning in the 1930s, some of the most ancient hominin remains of the time dating to 3.8–2.9 million years ago were recovered from East Africa. Because Australopithecus africanus fossils were commonly being discovered throughout the 1920s and '40s in South Africa, these remains were often provisionally classified as Australopithecus aff. africanus. The first to identify a human fossil was German explorer Ludwig Kohl-Larsen in 1939 by the headwaters of the Gerusi River (near Laetoli, Tanzania), who encountered a maxilla. In 1948, German palaeontologist Edwin Hennig proposed classifying it into a new genus, "Praeanthropus", but he failed to give a species name. In 1950, German anthropologist Hans Weinert proposed classifying it as Meganthropus africanus, but this was largely ignored. In 1955, M.S. Şenyürek proposed the combination Praeanthropus africanus. Major collections were made in Laetoli, Tanzania, on an expedition beginning in 1974 directed by British palaeoanthropologist Mary Leakey, and in Hadar, Ethiopia, from 1972 to 1977 by the International Afar Research Expedition (IARE) formed by French geologist Maurice Taieb, American palaeoanthropologist Donald Johanson and Breton anthropologist Yves Coppens. These fossils were remarkably well preserved and many had associated skeletal aspects. In 1973, the IARE team unearthed the first knee joint, AL 129-1, and showed the earliest example at the time of bipedalism. On 24 November 1974, Johanson and graduate student Tom Gray discovered the extremely well-preserved skeleton AL 288–1, commonly referred to as "Lucy" (named after the 1967 Beatles song Lucy in the Sky with Diamonds which was playing on their tape recorder that evening). In 1975, the IARE recovered 216 specimens belonging to 13 individuals, AL 333 "the First Family" (though the individuals were not necessarily related). In 1976, Leakey and colleagues discovered fossil trackways, and preliminarily classified Laetoli remains into Homo spp., attributing Australopithecus-like traits as evidence of them being transitional fossils.

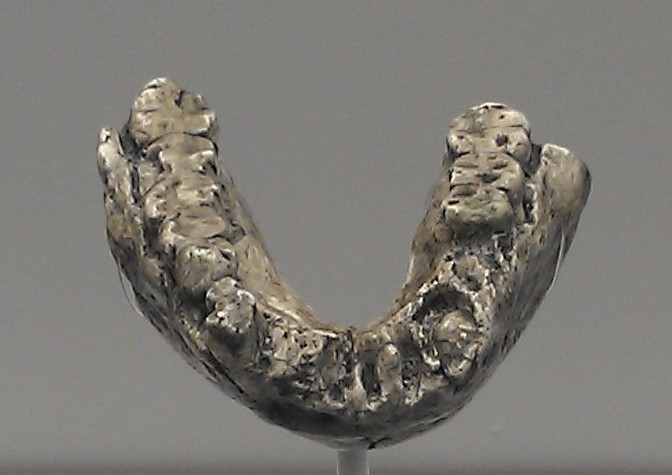
The holotype LH 4

In 1978, Johanson, Tim D. White and Coppens classified the hundreds of specimens collected thus far from both Hadar and Laetoli into a single new species, A. afarensis, and considered the apparently wide range of variation a result of sexual dimorphism. The specific name honours the Afar Region of Ethiopia where the majority of the specimens had been recovered from and replaces Weinert's africanus, which was already preoccupied by Australopithecus africanus. They later selected the jawbone LH 4 as the holotype specimen because of its preservation quality and because White had already fully described and illustrated it the year before.

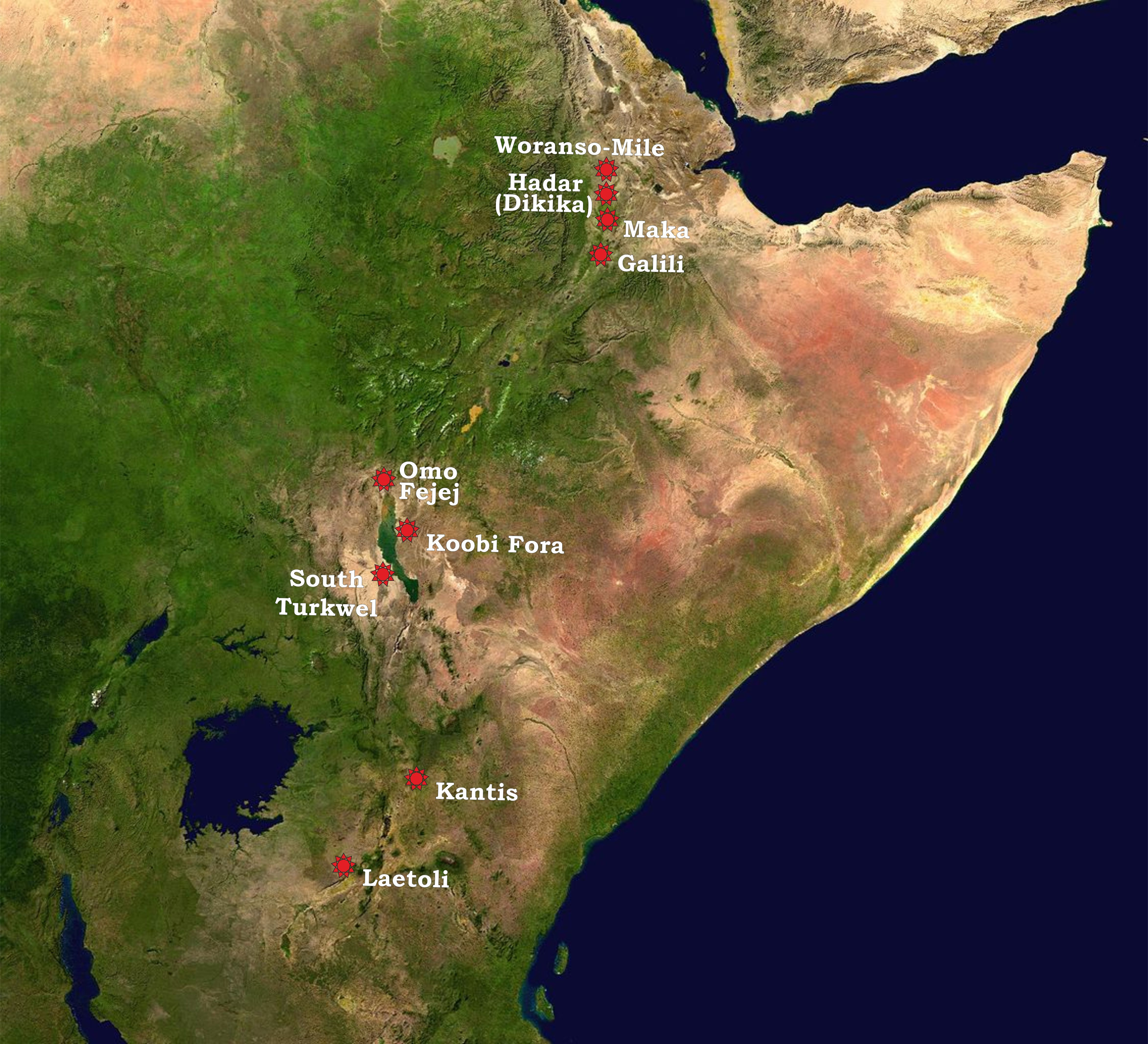
Locations of A. afarensis sites

A. afarensis is known only from East Africa. Beyond Laetoli and the Afar Region, the species has been recorded in Kenya at Koobi Fora and possibly Lothagam; and elsewhere in Ethiopia at Woranso-Mille, Maka, Belohdelie, Ledi-Geraru and Fejej. The frontal bone fragment BEL-VP-1/1 from the Middle Awash, Afar Region, Ethiopia, dating to 3.9 million years ago has typically been assigned to A. anamensis based on age, but may be assignable to A. afarensis because it exhibits a derived form of postorbital constriction. This would mean A. afarensis and A. anamensis coexisted for at least 100,000 years. In 2005, a second adult specimen preserving both skull and body elements, AL 438–1, was discovered in Hadar. In 2006, an infant partial skeleton, DIK-1-1, was unearthed at Dikika, Afar Region. In 2015, an adult partial skeleton, KSD-VP-1/1, was recovered from Woranso-Mille.

For a long time, A. afarensis was the oldest known African great ape until the 1994 description of the 4.4-million-year-old Ardipithecus ramidus, and a few earlier or contemporary taxa have been described since, including the 4-million-year-old A. anamensis in 1995, the 3.5-million-year-old Kenyanthropus platyops in 2001, the 6-million-year-old Orrorin tugenensis in 2001, and the 7- to 6-million-year-old Sahelanthropus tchadensis in 2002. Bipedalism was once thought to have evolved in australopithecines, but it is now thought to have begun evolving much earlier in habitually arboreal primates. The earliest claimed date for the beginnings of an upright spine and a primarily vertical body plan is 21.6 million years ago in the Early Miocene with Morotopithecus bishopi.

=== Classification ===
A. afarensis is now a widely accepted species, and it is now generally thought that Homo and Paranthropus are sister taxa deriving from Australopithecus, but the classification of Australopithecus species is in disarray. Australopithecus is considered a grade taxon whose members are united by their similar physiology rather than close relations with each other over other hominin genera. It is unclear how any Australopithecus species relate to each other, but it is generally thought that a population of A. anamensis evolved into A. afarensis.

In 1979, Johanson and White proposed that A. afarensis was the last common ancestor between Homo and Paranthropus, supplanting A. africanus in this role. Considerable debate of the validity of this species followed, with proposals for synonymising them with A. africanus or recognising multiple species from the Laetoli and Hadar remains. In 1980, South African palaeoanthropologist Phillip V. Tobias proposed reclassifying the Laetoli specimens as A. africanus afarensis and the Hadar specimens as A. afr. aethiopicus. The skull KNM-ER 1470 (now H. rudolfensis) was at first dated to 2.9 million years ago, which cast doubt on the ancestral position of both A. afarensis or A. africanus, but it has been re-dated to about 2 million years ago. Several Australopithecus species have since been postulated to represent the ancestor to Homo, but the 2013 discovery of the earliest Homo specimen, LD 350-1, 2.8 million years old (older than almost all other Australopithecus species) from the Afar Region could potentially affirm A. afarensis' ancestral position. However, A. afarensis is also argued to have been too derived (too specialised), due to resemblance in jaw anatomy to the robust australopithecines, to have been a human ancestor.

Palaeoartist Walter Ferguson has proposed splitting A. afarensis into "H. antiquus", a relict dryopithecine "Ramapithecus" (now Kenyapithecus) and a subspecies of A. africanus. His recommendations have largely been ignored. In 2003, Spanish writer Camilo José Cela Conde and evolutionary biologist Francisco J. Ayala proposed reinstating "Praeanthropus" including A. afarensis alongside Sahelanthropus, A. anamensis, A. bahrelghazali and A. garhi. In 2004, Danish biologist Bjarne Westergaard and geologist Niels Bonde proposed splitting off "Homo hadar" with the 3.2-million-year-old partial skull AL 333–45 as the holotype, because a foot from the First Family was apparently more humanlike than that of Lucy. In 2011, Bonde agreed with Ferguson that Lucy should be split into a new species, though erected a new genus as "Afaranthropus antiquus".

In 1996, a 3.6-million-year-old jaw from Koro Toro, Chad, originally classified as A. afarensis was split off into a new species as A. bahrelghazali. In 2015, some 3.5- to 3.3-million-year-old jaw specimens from the Afar Region (the same time and place as A. afarensis) were classified as a new species as A. deyiremeda, and the recognition of this species would call into question the species designation of fossils currently assigned to A. afarensis. However, the validity of A. bahrelghazali and A. deyiremeda is debated. Wood and Boyle (2016) stated there was "low confidence" that A. afarensis, A. bahrelghazali and A. deyiremeda are distinct species, with Kenyanthropus platyops perhaps being indistinct from the latter two.

African Hominin timeline

== Anatomy ==
=== Skull ===
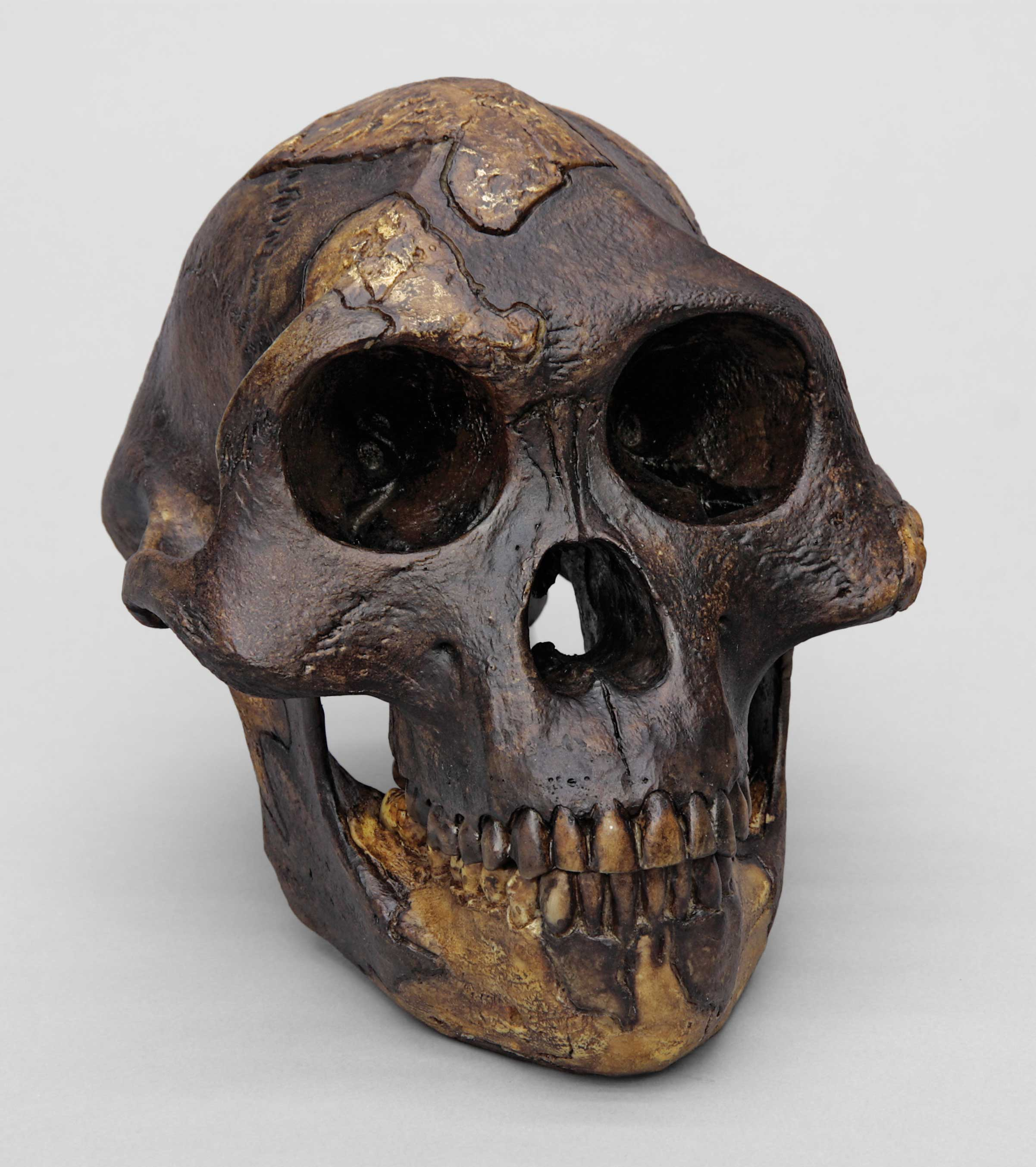
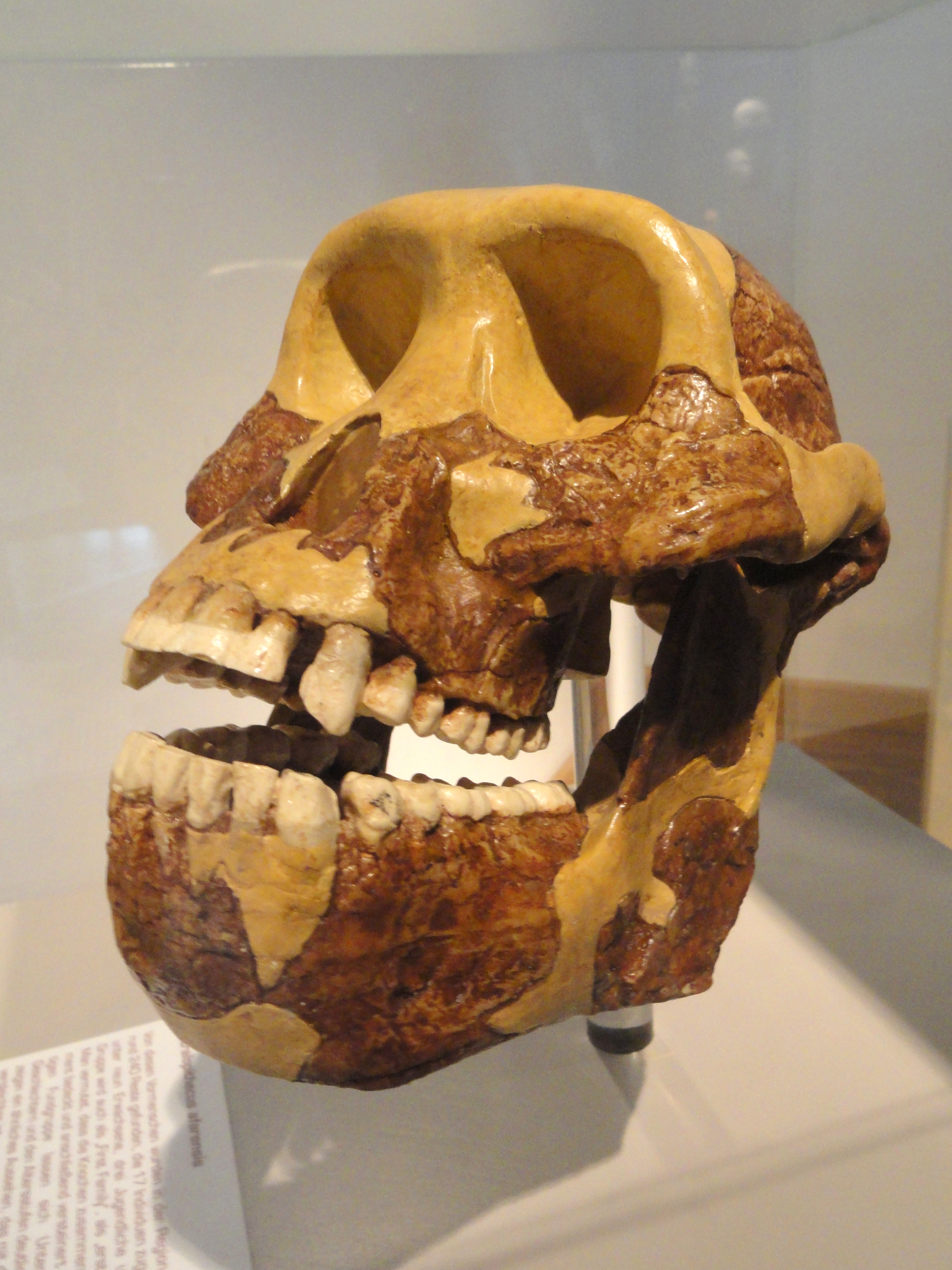
Two A. afarensis skulls

A. afarensis had a tall face, a delicate brow ridge, and prognathism (the jaw jutted outwards). One of the biggest skulls, AL 444–2, is about the size of a female gorilla skull. The first relatively complete jawbone was discovered in 2002, AL 822–1. This specimen strongly resembles the deep and robust gorilla jawbone. However, unlike gorillas, the strength of the sagittal and nuchal crests (which support the temporalis muscle used in biting) do not vary between sexes. The crests are similar to those of chimpanzees and female gorillas. Compared to earlier hominins, the incisors of A. afarensis are reduced in breadth, the canines reduced in size and lost the honing mechanism which continually sharpens them, the premolars are molar-shaped, and the molars are taller. The P_{3} of male A. afarensis exhibits a high degree of molarisation, in contrast to the female A. afarensis P_{3}. The molars of australopiths are generally large and flat with thick enamel, which is ideal for crushing hard and brittle foods.

The brain volume of Lucy was estimated to have been 365–417 cc, specimen AL 822-1 about 374–392 cc, AL 333-45 about 486–492 cc, and AL 444-2 about 519–526 cc. This would make for an average of about 445 cc. The brain volumes of the infant (about 2.5 years of age) specimens DIK-1-1 and AL 333-105 are 273–277 and 310–315 cc, respectively. Using these measurements, the brain growth rate of A. afarensis was closer to the growth rate of modern humans than to the faster rate in chimpanzees. Though brain growth was prolonged, the duration was nonetheless much shorter than modern humans, which is why the adult A. afarensis brain was so much smaller. The A. afarensis brain was likely organised like non-human ape brains, with no evidence for humanlike brain configuration.

=== Size ===
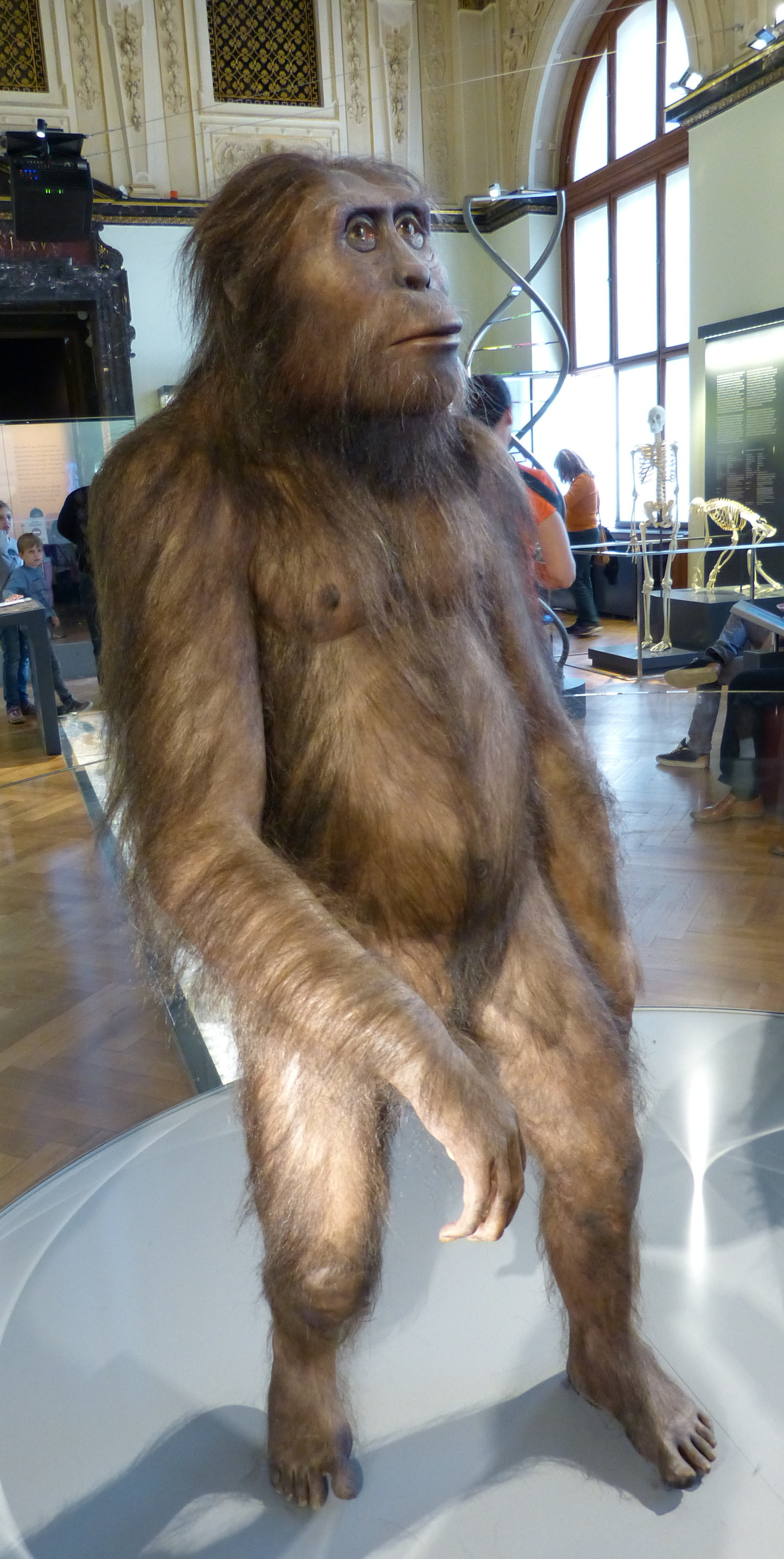
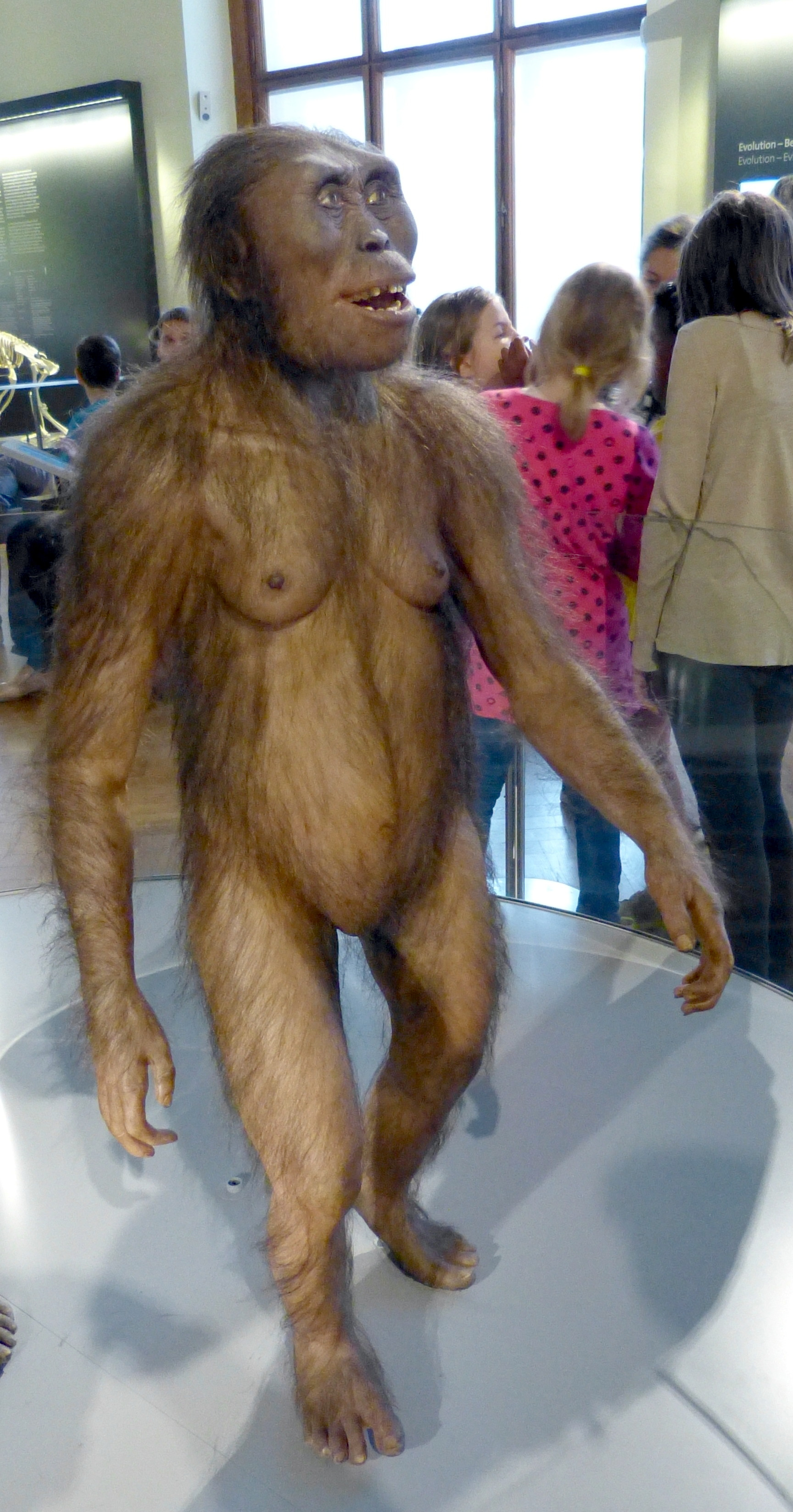
Reconstruction of a male (left) and female (right) A. afarensis at the Natural History Museum, Vienna

A. afarensis specimens apparently exhibit a wide range of variation, which is generally explained as marked sexual dimorphism with males much bigger than females. In 1991, American anthropologist Henry McHenry estimated body size by measuring the joint sizes of the leg bones and scaling down a human to meet that size. This yielded 151 cm (4 ft 11 in) for a presumed male (AL 333–3), whereas Lucy was 105 cm (3 ft 5 in). In 1992, he estimated that males typically weighed about 44.6 kg (98 lb) and females 29.3 kg (65 lb) assuming body proportions were more humanlike than apelike. This gives a male to female body mass ratio of 1.52, compared to 1.22 in modern humans, 1.37 in chimpanzees, and about 2 for gorillas and orangutans. However, this commonly cited weight figure used only three presumed-female specimens, of which two were among the smallest specimens recorded for the species. It is also contested if australopiths even exhibited heightened sexual dimorphism at all, which if correct would mean the range of variation is normal body size disparity between different individuals regardless of sex. It has also been argued that the femoral head could be used for more accurate size modeling, and the femoral head size variation was the same for both sexes.

Lucy is one of the most complete Pliocene hominin skeletons, with over 40% preserved, but she was one of the smaller specimens of her species. Nonetheless, she has been the subject of several body mass estimates since her discovery, ranging from 13–42 kg (29–93 lb) for absolute lower and upper bounds. Most studies report ranges within 25–37 kg (55–82 lb).

For the five makers of the Laetoli fossil trackways (S1, S2, G1, G2 and G3), based on the relationship between footprint length and bodily dimensions in modern humans, S1 was estimated to have been considerably large at about 165 cm (5 ft 5 in) tall and 45 kg (99 lb) in weight, S2 145 cm (4 ft 9 in) and 39.5 kg (87 lb), G1 114 cm (3 ft 9 in) and 30 kg (66 lb), G2 142 cm (4 ft 8 in) and 39 kg (86 lb), and G3 132 cm (4 ft 4 in) and 35 kg (77 lb). Based on these, S1 is interpreted to have been a male, and the rest females (G1 and G3 possibly juveniles), with A. afarensis being a highly dimorphic species.

=== Torso ===
DIK-1-1 preserves an oval hyoid bone (which supports the tongue) more similar to those of chimpanzees and gorillas than the bar-shaped hyoid of humans and orangutans. This would suggest the presence of laryngeal air sacs characteristic of non-human African apes (and large gibbons). Air sacs may lower the risk of hyperventilating when producing faster extended call sequences by rebreathing exhaled air from the air sacs. The loss of these in humans could have been a result of speech and resulting low risk of hyperventilating from normal vocalisation patterns.

It was previously thought that the australopithecines' spine was more like that of non-human apes than humans, with weak neck vertebrae. However, the thickness of the neck vertebrae of KSD-VP-1/1 is similar to that of modern humans. Like humans, the series has a bulge and achieves maximum girth at C5 and 6, which in humans is associated with the brachial plexus, responsible for nerves and muscle innervation in the arms and hands. This could perhaps speak to advanced motor functions in the hands of A. afarensis and competency at precision tasks compared to non-human apes, possibly implicated in stone tool use or production. However, this could have been involved in head stability or posture rather than dexterity. A.L. 333-101 and A.L. 333-106 lack evidence of this feature. The neck vertebrae of KDS-VP-1/1 indicate that the nuchal ligament, which stabilises the head while distance running in humans and other cursorial creatures, was either not well developed or absent. KSD-VP-1/1, preserving (among other skeletal elements) six rib fragments, indicates that A. afarensis had a bell-shaped ribcage instead of the barrel shaped ribcage exhibited in modern humans. Nonetheless, the constriction at the upper ribcage was not so marked as exhibited in non-human great apes and was quite similar to humans. Originally, the vertebral centra preserved in Lucy were interpreted as being the T6, T8, T10, T11 and L3, but a 2015 study instead interpreted them as being T6, T7, T9, T10 and L3. DIK-1-1 shows that australopithecines had twelve thoracic vertebrae like modern humans instead of thirteen like non-human apes. Like humans, australopiths likely had five lumbar vertebrae, and this series was likely long and flexible in contrast to the short and inflexible non-human great ape lumbar series.

=== Upper limbs ===
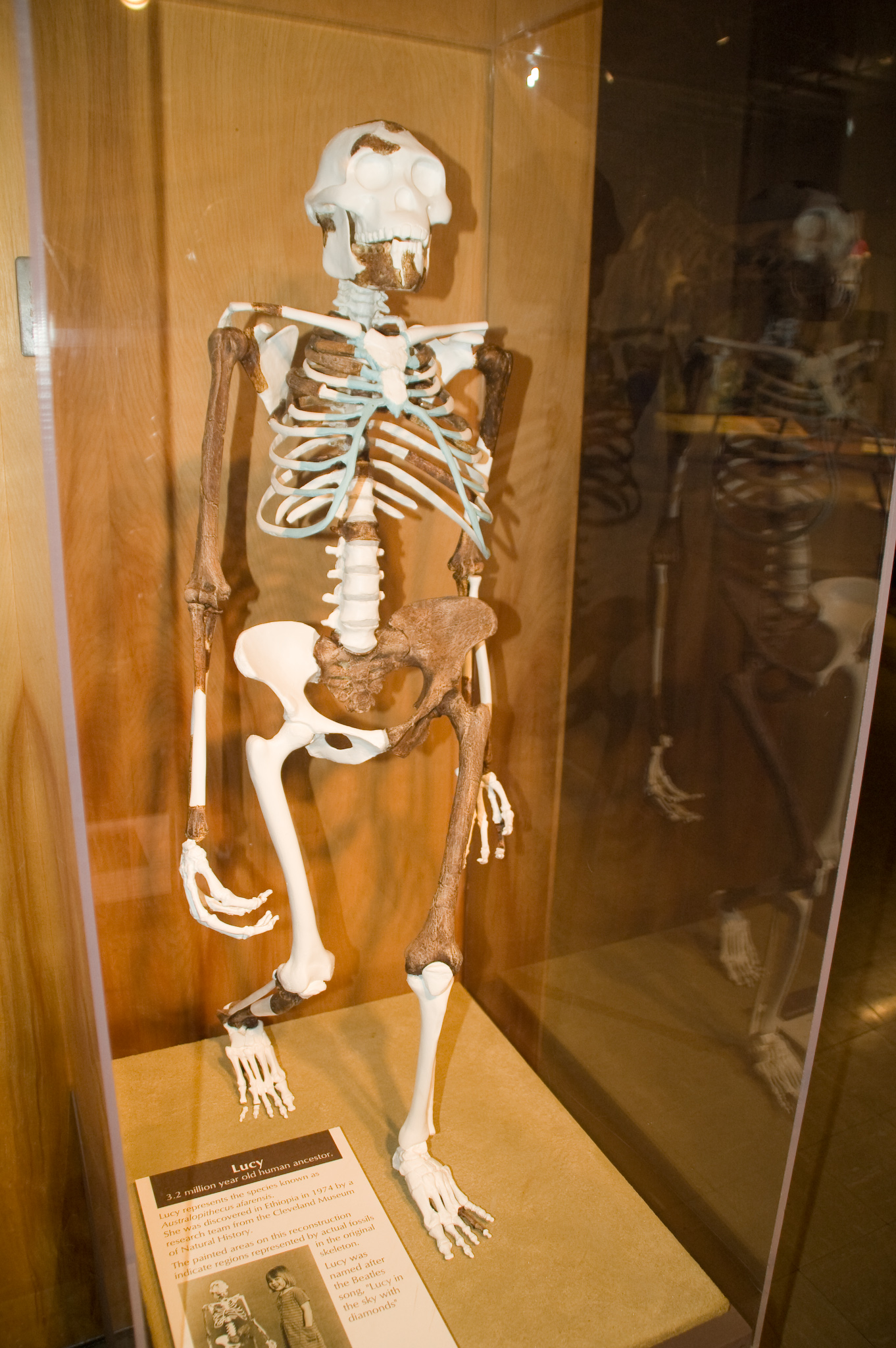
"Lucy" skeleton reconstruction

Like other australopiths, the A. afarensis skeleton exhibits a mosaic anatomy with some aspects similar to modern humans and others to non-human great apes. The pelvis and leg bones clearly indicate weight-bearing ability, equating to habitual bipedalism, but the upper limbs are reminiscent of orangutans, which would indicate arboreal locomotion. However, this is much debated, as tree-climbing adaptations could simply be basal traits inherited from the great ape last common ancestor in the absence of major selective pressures at this stage to adopt a more humanlike arm anatomy.

The shoulder joint is somewhat in a shrugging position, closer to the head, like in non-human apes. Juvenile modern humans have a somewhat similar configuration, but this changes to the normal human condition with age; such a change does not appear to have occurred in A. afarensis development. It was once argued that this was simply a byproduct of being a small-bodied species, but the discovery of the similarly sized H. floresiensis with a more or less human shoulder configuration and larger A. afarensis specimens retaining the shrugging shoulders show this to not have been the case. The scapular spine (reflecting the strength of the back muscles) is closer to the range of gorillas.

The forearm of A. afarensis is incompletely known, yielding various brachial indexes (radial length divided by humeral length) comparable to non-human great apes at the upper estimate and to modern humans at the lower estimate. The most complete ulna specimen, AL 438–1, is within the range of modern humans and other African apes. However, the L40-19 ulna is much longer, though well below that exhibited in orangutans and gibbons. The AL 438-1 metacarpals are proportionally similar to those of modern humans and orangutans. The A. afarensis hand is quite humanlike, though there are some aspects similar to orangutan hands which would have allowed stronger flexion of the fingers, and it probably could not handle large spherical or cylindrical objects very efficiently. Nonetheless, the hand seems to have been able to have produced a precision grip necessary in using stone tools. However, it is unclear if the hand was capable of producing stone tools.

=== Lower limbs ===
The australopith pelvis is platypelloid and maintains a relatively wider distance between the hip sockets and a more oval shape. Despite being much smaller, Lucy's pelvic inlet is 132 mm (5.2 in) wide, about the same breadth as that of a modern human woman. These were likely adaptations to minimise how far the centre of mass drops while walking upright in order to compensate for the short legs (rotating the hips may have been more important for A. afarensis). Likewise, later Homo could reduce relative pelvic inlet size probably due to the elongation of the legs. Pelvic inlet size may not have been due to fetal head size (which would have increased birth canal and thus pelvic inlet width) as an A. afarensis newborn would have had a similar or smaller head size compared to that of a newborn chimpanzee. It is debated if the platypelloid pelvis provided poorer leverage for the hamstrings or not.

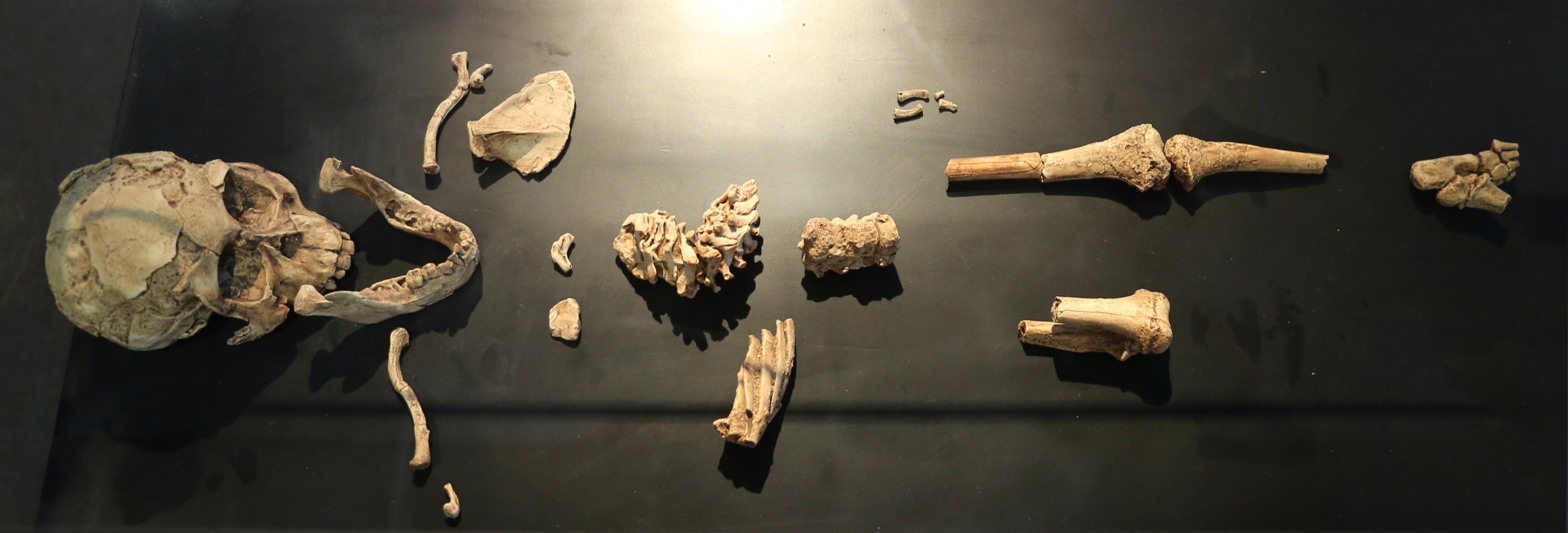
DIK-1-1 skeleton; notice the diverging left big toe bone

The heel bone of A. afarensis adults and modern humans have the same adaptations for bipedality, indicating a developed grade of walking. The big toe is not dextrous as is in non-human apes (it is adducted), which would make walking more energy efficient at the expense of arboreal locomotion, no longer able to grasp onto tree branches with the feet. However, the foot of the infantile specimen DIK-1-1 indicates some mobility of the big toe, though not to the degree in non-human primates. This would have reduced walking efficiency, but a partially dextrous foot in the juvenile stage may have been important in climbing activities for food or safety, or made it easier for the infant to cling onto and be carried by an adult.

== Palaeobiology ==
=== Diet and technology ===
A. afarensis was likely a generalist omnivore. Carbon isotope analysis on teeth from Hadar and Dikika 3.4–2.9 million years ago suggests a widely ranging diet between different specimens, with forest-dwelling specimens showing a preference for C_{3} forest plants, and bush- or grassland-dwelling specimens a preference for C_{4} and CAM savanna plants. C_{4}–CAM sources include grass, seeds, roots, underground storage organs, succulents and perhaps creatures which ate those, such as termites. Thus, A. afarensis appears to have been capable of exploiting a variety of food resources in a wide range of habitats. In contrast, the earlier A. anamensis and Ar. ramidus, as well as modern savanna chimpanzees, target the same types of food as forest-dwelling counterparts despite living in an environment where these plants are much less abundant. Few modern primate species consume C_{4} CAM plants. The dental anatomy of A. afarensis is ideal for consuming hard, brittle foods, but microwearing patterns on the occlusal surfaces of the molars suggest that such foods were infrequently consumed, probably as fallback items in leaner times. Buccal microwear patterns indicate its consumption of hard, brittle foods was more infrequent than that of A. anamensis. The greater molarisation in male mandibular third premolars as compared to those of females also suggests that sexual differences may have existed in A. afarensis, with females preferring foraging in more arboreal environments. Males, in contrast, would have foraged in more open terrestrial habitats.

In 2009 at Dikika, Ethiopia, a rib fragment belonging to a cow-sized hoofed animal and a partial femur of a goat-sized juvenile bovid was found to exhibit cut marks, and the former some crushing, which were initially interpreted as the oldest evidence of butchering with stone tools. If correct, this would make it the oldest evidence of sharp-edged stone tool use at 3.4 million years old, and would be attributable to A. afarensis as it is the only hominin species known within the time and place. However, because the fossils were found in a sandstone unit (and were modified by abrasive sand and gravel particles during the fossilisation process), the attribution to hominin activity is weak.

=== Society ===
It is highly difficult to speculate with accuracy the group dynamics of early hominins. A. afarensis is typically reconstructed with high levels of sexual dimorphism, with males much larger than females. Using general trends in modern primates, high sexual dimorphism usually equates to a polygynous society due to intense male–male competition over females, like in the harem society of gorillas. However, it has also been argued that A. afarensis had much lower levels of dimorphism, and so had a multi-male kin-based society like chimpanzees. Low dimorphism could also be interpreted as having had a monogamous society with strong male–male competition. Contrarily, the canine teeth are much smaller in A. afarensis than in non-human primates, which should indicate lower aggression because canine size is generally positively correlated with male–male aggression.

=== Birth ===
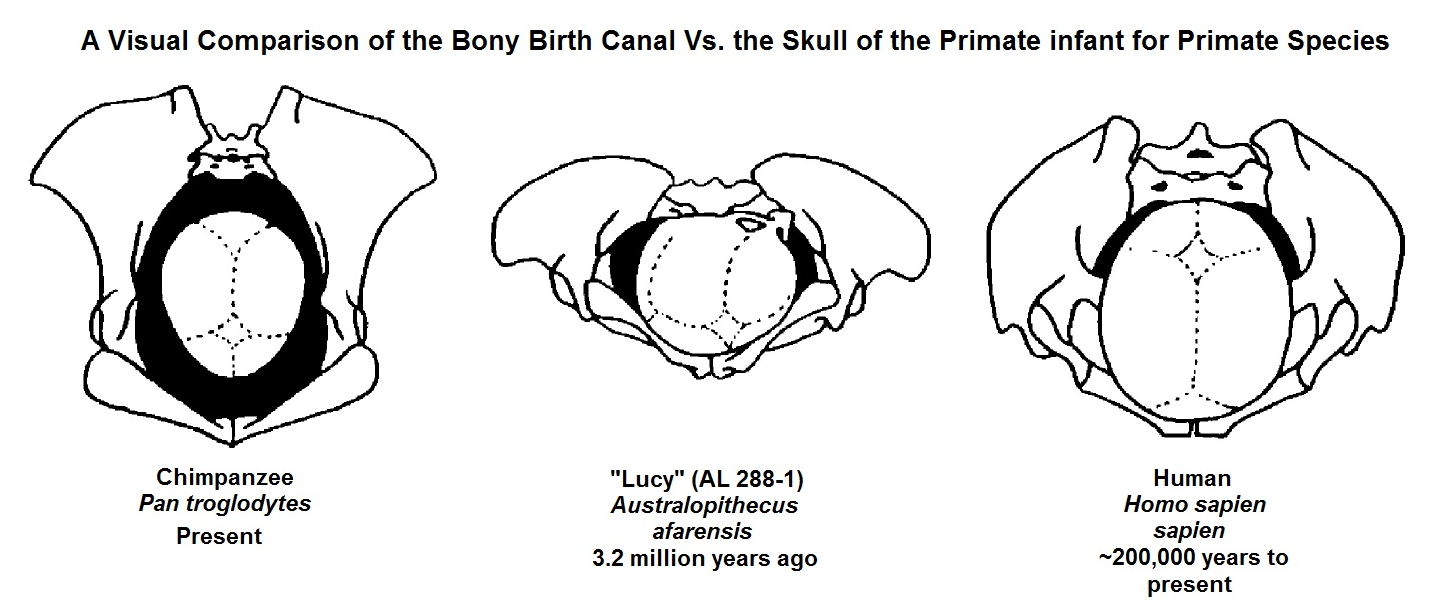
Diagram comparing birthing mechanisms of a chimpanzee (left), A. afarensis (middle) and a modern human (right)

The platypelloid pelvis may have caused a different birthing mechanism from modern humans, with the neonate entering the inlet facing laterally (the head was transversally orientated) until it exited through the pelvic outlet. This would be a non-rotational birth, as opposed to a fully rotational birth in humans. However, it has been suggested that the shoulders of the neonate may have been obstructed, and the neonate could have instead entered the inlet transversely and then rotated so that it exited through the outlet oblique to the main axis of the pelvis, which would be a semi-rotational birth. By this argument, there may not have been much space for the neonate to pass through the birth canal, causing a difficult childbirth for the mother.

=== Gait ===
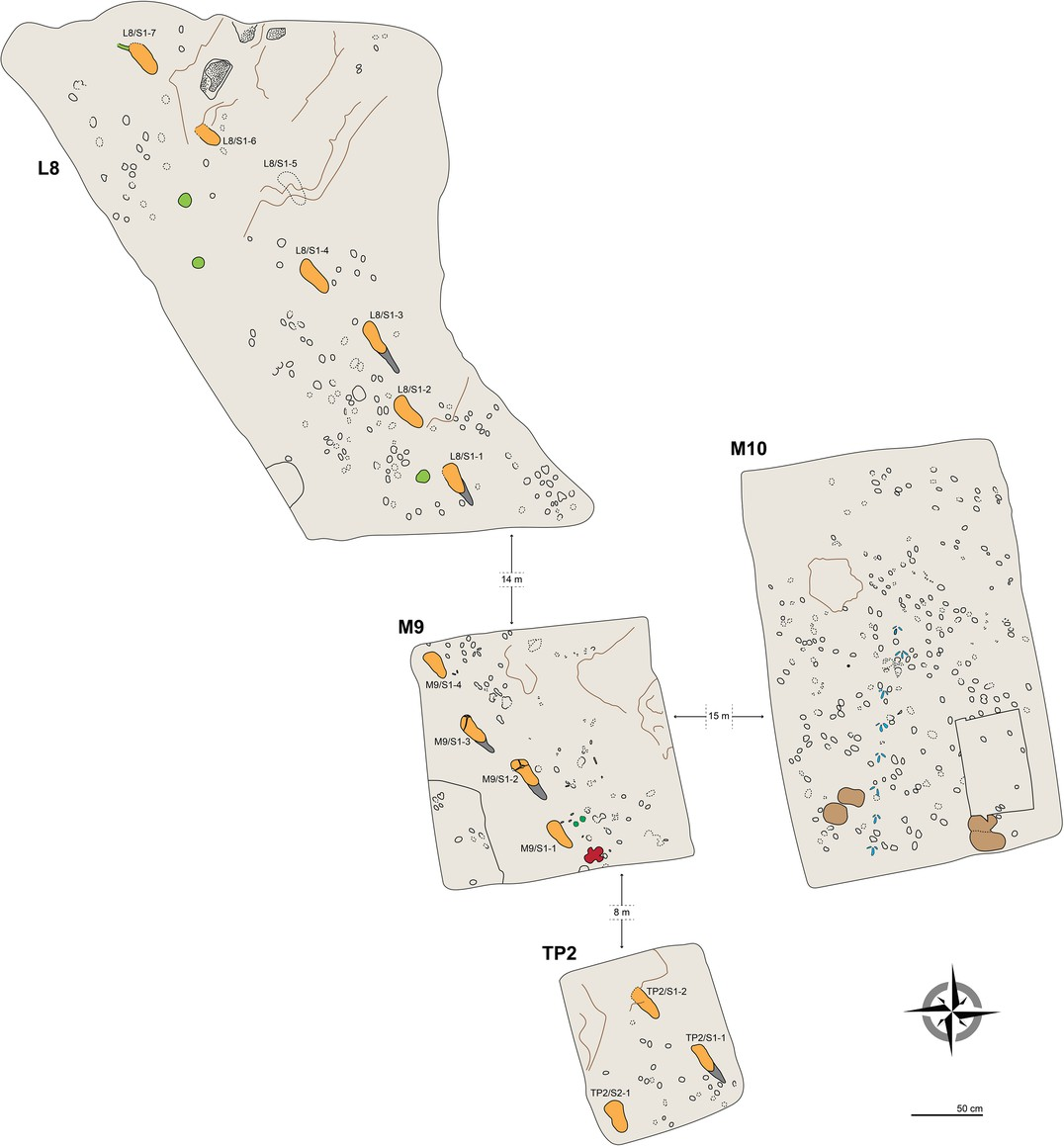
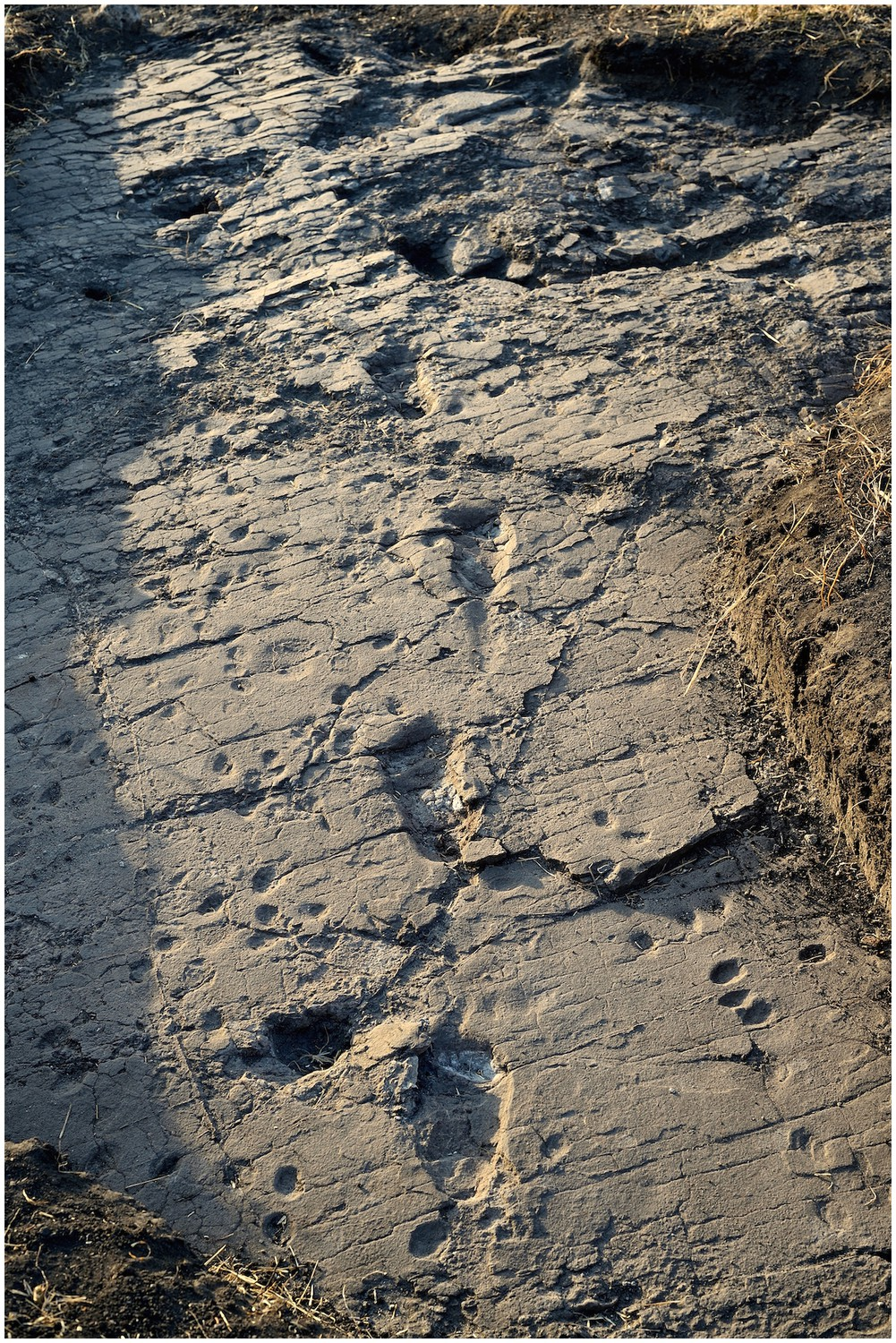
Overview of the S1 trackway (above) and image of the L8 test-pit (below)

The Laetoli fossil trackway, generally attributed to A. afarensis, indicates a rather developed grade of bipedal locomotion, more efficient than the bent-hip–bent-knee (BHBK) gait used by non-human great apes (though earlier interpretations of the gait include a BHBK posture or a shuffling movement). Trail A consists of short, broad prints resembling those of a two-and-a-half-year-old child, though it has been suggested this trail was made by the extinct bear Agriotherium africanus. G1 is a trail consisting of four cycles likely made by a child. G2 and G3 are thought to have been made by two adults. In 2015, two more trackways were discovered made by one individual, named S1, extending for a total of 32 m (105 ft). In 2015, a single footprint from a different individual, S2, was discovered.

The shallowness of the toe prints would indicate a more flexed limb posture when the foot hit the ground and perhaps a less arched foot, meaning A. afarensis was less efficient at bipedal locomotion than humans. Some tracks feature a 100 mm (3.9 in) long drag mark probably left by the heel, which may indicate the foot was lifted at a low angle to the ground. For push-off, it appears weight shifted from the heel to the side of the foot and then the toes. Some footprints of S1 either indicate asymmetrical walking where weight was sometimes placed on the anterolateral part (the side of the front half of the foot) before toe-off, or sometimes the upper body was rotated mid-step. The angle of gait (the angle between the direction the foot is pointing in on touchdown and median line drawn through the entire trackway) ranges from 2–11° for both right and left sides. G1 generally shows wide and asymmetrical angles, whereas the others typically show low angles.

The speed of the track makers has been variously estimated depending on the method used, with G1 reported at 0.47, 0.56, 0.64, 0.7 and 1 m/s (1.7, 2.0, 2.3, 2.5 and 3.6 km/h; 1.1, 1.3, 1.4, 1.6 and 2.2 mph); G2/3 reported at 0.37, 0.84 and 1 m/s (1.3, 3.0 and 3.6 km/h; 0.83, 1.88 and 2.24 mph); and S1 at 0.51 or 0.93 m/s (1.8 or 3.3 km/h; 1.1 or 2.1 mph). For comparison, modern humans typically walk at 1–1.7 m/s (3.6–6.1 km/h; 2.2–3.8 mph).

The average step distance is 568 mm (1.86 ft), and stride distance 1,139 mm (3.74 ft). S1 appears to have had the highest average step and stride length of, respectively, 505–660 mm^{2} (0.783–1.023 sq in) and 1,044–1,284 mm (3.43–4.21 ft) whereas G1–G3 averaged, respectively, 416, 453 and 433 mm (16.4, 17.8 and 17.0 in; 1.365, 1.486 and 1.421 ft) for step and 829, 880 and 876 mm (32.6, 34.6 and 34.5 in; 2.720, 2.887 and 2.874 ft) for stride.

A. afarensis was also capable of bipedal running with absolute speeds of 1.74–4.97 meters per second (6.3–17.9 km/h; 3.9–11.1 mph), slower than modern humans with maximum running speeds up to 7.9 meters per second (28 km/h; 18 mph), and its running energetics was similar to those of mammals and birds of similar body size. It has been suggested that the bipedal gait evolved specifically to improve running rather than to just enhance walking.

=== Pathology ===
Australopithecines, in general, seem to have had a high incidence rate of vertebral pathologies, possibly because their vertebrae were better adapted to withstand suspension loads in climbing than compressive loads while walking upright. Lucy presents marked thoracic kyphosis (hunchback) and was diagnosed with Scheuermann's disease, probably caused by overstraining her back, which can lead to a hunched posture in modern humans due to irregular curving of the spine. Because her condition presented quite similarly to that seen in modern human patients, this would indicate a basically human range of locomotor function in walking for A. afarensis. The original straining may have occurred while climbing or swinging in the trees, though, even if correct, this does not indicate that her species was maladapted for arboreal behaviour, much like how humans are not maladapted for bipedal posture despite developing arthritis. KSD-VP-1/1 seemingly exhibits compensatory action by the neck and lumbar vertebrae (gooseneck) consistent with thoracic kyphosis and Scheuermann's disease, but thoracic vertebrae are not preserved in this specimen.

In 2010, KSD-VP-1/1 presented evidence of a valgus deformity of the left ankle involving the fibula, with a bony ring developing on the fibula's joint surface extending the bone an additional 5–10 mm (0.20–0.39 in). This was probably caused by a fibular fracture during childhood which improperly healed in a nonunion.

In 2016, palaeoanthropologist John Kappelman argued that the fracturing exhibited by Lucy was consistent with a proximal humerus fracture, which is most often caused by falling in humans. He then concluded she died from falling out of a tree, and that A. afarensis slept in trees or climbed trees to escape predators. However, similar fracturing is exhibited in many other creatures in the area, including the bones of antelope, elephants, giraffes and rhinos, and may well simply be taphonomic bias (fracturing was caused by fossilisation). Lucy may also have been killed in an animal attack or a mudslide.

The 13 AL 333 individuals are thought to have been deposited at about the same time as one another, bear little evidence of carnivore activity, and were buried on a 7 m (23 ft) stretch of a hill. In 1981, anthropologists James Louis Aronson and Taieb suggested they were killed in a flash flood. British archaeologist Paul Pettitt considered natural causes unlikely and, in 2013, speculated that these individuals were purposefully hidden in tall grass by other hominins (funerary caching). This behaviour has been documented in modern primates, and may be done so that the recently deceased do not attract predators to living grounds.

== Palaeoecology ==
A. afarensis was extremely adaptable in its environmental preferences. It does not appear to have had a preferred environment and it inhabited a wide range of habitats such as open grasslands or woodlands, shrublands, and lake- or riverside forests. Likewise, the animal assemblage varied widely from site to site. The Pliocene of East Africa was warm and wet compared to the preceding Miocene, with the dry season lasting about four months based on floral, faunal, and geological evidence. The extended rainy season would have made more desirable foods available to hominins for most of the year. During the Late Pliocene around 4–3 million years ago, Africa featured a greater diversity of large carnivores than today, and australopithecines likely fell prey to these dangerous creatures, including hyenas, Panthera, cheetahs, and the saber-toothed cats: Megantereon, Dinofelis, Homotherium and Machairodus. The extinct hyena Chasmaporthetes is believed to have eaten A. afarensis, while it was an unlikely prey item for the species Crocuta venustula.

Australopithecines and early Homo likely preferred cooler conditions than later Homo, as there are no australopithecine sites that were below 1,000 m (3,300 ft) in elevation at the time of deposition. This would mean that, like chimpanzees, they often inhabited areas with an average diurnal temperature of 25 °C (77 °F), dropping to 10 or 5 °C (50 or 41 °F) at night. At Hadar, the average temperature from 3.4 to 2.95 million years ago was about 20.2 °C (68.4 °F).

== See also ==
- Ardipithecus ramidus
- Australopithecus anamensis
- Australopithecus bahrelghazali
- Australopithecus deyiremeda
- Kenyanthropus
- LD 350-1
- List of fossil sites (with link directory)
- List of human evolution fossils (with images)
- Lomekwi
