= Jon Kalb =

American geologist (1941–2017)

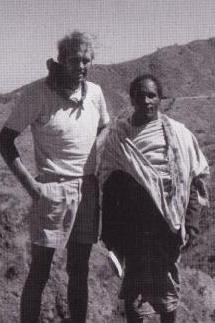
- Jon Kalb with an Afar chief
- Born: 17 August 1941
- Died: 27 October 2017 (aged 76)

Jon Kalb (August 17, 1941, in Houston, Texas – October 27, 2017, in Austin, Texas) was a research geologist with the Vertebrate Paleontology Laboratory (Texas Memorial Museum), University of Texas at Austin. He received a pre-doctoral fellowship from the Carnegie Geophysical Laboratory in 1968, a graduate fellowship from Johns Hopkins University in 1969, and a BSc from American University in 1970.

== Early experience ==
As a teenager Kalb began his career with a Mexican-American expedition searching for early shipwrecks off the coast of the Yucatan. He later joined famed treasure hunter and marine archeologist Bob Marx exploring reefs in the Caribbean.

Sidelined by injuries from diving, Kalb was sent to the west coast of South America by the Smithsonian to collect marine fauna. He then joined a team of geologists with the U.S. Army Corps of Engineers in northwest Colombia mapping a potential route for a sea-level canal, which led him to prospect for gold on the Guinean Shield for the Guyana Geological Survey. While at Johns Hopkins he became interested in the plate tectonics of the Afar Depression, a triple (rift) junction in northeastern Ethiopia. In 1971 he moved to Addis Ababa with his family and over the next seven years explored the Awash Valley in the central and western Afar.

== Discoveries ==
Kalb was a founder of the International Afar Research Expedition. Donald Johanson found the 3.2 million year old Lucy skeleton. Kalb started the Rift Valley Research Mission. Kalb was later director of the Ethiopia-based mission that pioneered explorations in the Middle Awash, revealing some of the most prolific deposits bearing early hominin fossils and artifacts in the world. Discoveries included a nearly complete hyper-robust skull of a 600,000-year-old pre-Neanderthal; and a 4.4 million-year-old fossil skeleton Ardipithecus found by Tim White. From the Middle Awash site Kalb and Assefa Mebrate described the most complete known record of ancestral elephants (18 species) from a single area, which fauna serve as an analog to other equally diverse faunal groups recovered from the region, including hominids and the earliest hominins. Scores of archeological localities were found, ranging in time from the late Pliocene with the earliest stone tools to late Pleistocene sites containing pottery. In a 2010 publication Kalb proposed that the land of Punt—a trading partner with ancient Egypt—was situated in the central Afar, a short trek from the Gulf of Tadjura.

== Conflicts ==
After Kalb established a model-training program for Ethiopian students, and the first paleobiology research laboratory in the country, he was expelled from Ethiopia in mid-1978 amid fabricated allegations he spied for the CIA. In 1977 the U.S. National Science Foundation declined funds to Kalb's team based on these same charges, as revealed by documents he obtained under the Freedom of Information Act. A year later he won a court stipulated settlement with NSF concluding that he was denied a fair hearing under the Privacy Act. A year later he successfully petitioned NSF under the First Amendment to reform its peer review system.

== Recent years ==
Following more trips to Africa—joining teams with the USGS, Technische Universität Berlin, and the University of Vienna—Kalb renewed surveys for Eocene mammals begun in the 1930s along the remote borderlands of West Texas. Described as the "American Afar", the region is hot, wild, and minced by faults of the Rio Grande rift with parallels to the "African Afar". To date the area has produced over 4000 extinct mammals, including some of the last known primates in North America.

== Awards ==
- Robert W. Hamilton Award. University of Texas at Austin. For non-fiction, Adventures in the Bone Trade, 2002
- Violet Crown Award, Writers League of Texas. For non-fiction, Adventures in the Bone Trade, 2001.
- Court Stipulated Settlement, Kalb vs National Science Foundation. D.D.C., Civ. No. 86-3557, 8 December 1987.

== Selected bibliography ==
- Kalb, Jon. 2011. Hunting Tapir During the Great Flood, And Other Tales of Exploration and High Adventure. Special Delivery Books, Alpine, Texas. 288pp.
- Kalb, Jon. 2001. Adventures in the Bone Trade: The Race to Discover Early Human Ancestors in Ethiopia's Afar Depression. Copernicus Books (imprint of Springer-Verlag) 389pp.
- Kalb, Jon, et al. 2000. Bibliography of the Earth Sciences for the Horn of Africa: Ethiopia, Eritrea, Somalia, and Djibouti 1620-1993. American Geological Institute, Alexandria, Virginia. 149pp.
- Kalb, J. E., D.J. Froehlich, and G. L. Bell. 1996. Phylogeny of African and Eurasian Elephantoidea of the late Neogene. Chapter 12B, 117-123. In: The Proboscidea—Trends in Evolution and Paleoecology, Eds. J. Shoshani and P. Tassy. Oxford University Press.
- Froehlich, D. J.; Kalb, J. E. (1995). "Three dimensional reconstruction of elephantoid molars: applications for functional anatomy and systematics". Paleobiology. 21 (3): 379–392. doi:10.1017/S0094837300013361. S2CID 89472907.
- Kalb, J. E. (1995). "Fossil elephantoids, Awash paleolake basins, and the Afar triple junction, Ethiopia". Palaeogeography, Palaeoclimatology, Palaeoecology. 114 (2–4): 357–368. doi:10.1016/0031-0182(94)00088-p.
- Kalb, J. E. (1993). "Refined stratigraphy of the hominid-bearing Awash Group, Afar Depression, Ethiopia". Newsletters on Stratigraphy. 29 (1): 21–62. doi:10.1127/nos/29/1993/21.
- Kalb, J. E.; Jolly, C. J.; Tebedge, Sleshi; et al. (1992). "Vertebrate faunas from the Awash Group, Middle Awash Valley, Afar, Ethiopia". Journal of Vertebrate Paleontology. 2 (1): 237–238. doi:10.1080/02724634.1982.10011932.
- Kalb, J. E.; Oswald, E. B.; Mebrate; et al. (1982). "1982. Stratigraphy of the Awash Group, Middle Awash Valley, Afar, Ethiopia". Newsletters on Stratigraphy. 11 (3): 95–127. doi:10.1127/nos/11/1982/95.

=== Fiction ===
- Kalb, Jon. 2007. The Gift: Discovery, Treachery, and Revenge. Special Delivery Books, Alpine, Texas. Reviewed in Nature 451: 128.
