= C. Owen Lovejoy =

American evolutionary anthropologist and anatomist (born 1943)

Claude Owen Lovejoy (born February 11, 1943), credited in publications as C. Owen Lovejoy,^{[a]} is an American evolutionary anthropologist and anatomist at Kent State University in Kent, Ohio. He is best known for his work on Australopithecine locomotion and the origins of bipedalism. His article, "The Origin of Man", published in the journal Science in January 1981, is among his best-known works.

== Early life and education ==
Owen Lovejoy was born in Paducah, Kentucky. Lovejoy obtained his B.A. in psychology from Western Reserve University (1965), his M.A. in biological anthropology from Case Institute of Technology (1967), and his Ph.D. from the University of Massachusetts Amherst in biological anthropology (1970). His father owned a small chain of hotels and the family spent their summers on lakes in Michigan, combining recreation with Christian charitable building work.

== Career ==
Since 1968, Lovejoy has been teaching at Kent State University in Ohio. During this time Lovejoy has published more than 100 articles related to his research, including for general interest magazines as well as professional journals, such as Science, Nature, Bioessays and Scientific American.

Lovejoy is most well known for his work on reconstructing Lucy (Australopithecus)—a near-complete fossil of a human ancestor that walked upright more than three million years ago. His research has covered a broad spectrum of human biological areas from eukaryotic mutations to ectocranial suture closures. Much of Lovejoy's research focuses on bipedal locomotion and its evolution. Many of his publications involve the thorough study of specific features of the hominid skeletal system or that of its ancestors. Often described as an anatomist, he is an adjunct professor of anatomy at Northeast Ohio Medical University (formerly known as the Northeastern Ohio Universities College of Medicine)

In addition, he is part of a team that has conducted 17 years of biological analysis of Ardi (Ardipithecus ramidus) – a near-complete 4.4-million-year-old hominid fossil found in present-day Ethiopia. Publication of a special issue of Science in October 2009 about this research demonstrated that hominid history was nearly one million years older than believed, and provided new information on the evolution of human limbs and locomotion, the habitats occupied by early hominids, and the nature of our last common ancestor with chimps.

Lovejoy has been active in paleodemography and human origins modeling. He has theorized that upright walking was closely tied to monogamous mating in early hominids (Provisioning Model).

Interested in general education, Lovejoy has used a variety of venues to teach about science. Through consulting on television productions, he has reached large audiences. For instance, he worked with PBS on their 1997 NOVA special on human evolution. Based on the groundbreaking "Ardi" research, Lovejoy worked with the Discovery Channel on two specials related to his team's nearly two decades of research: Discovering Ardi (2009), aired after the special issue of Science was published, and Understanding Ardi (2009).

In additional academic appointments, Lovejoy serves as clinical professor of anatomy at Northeastern Ohio Universities College of Medicine, and a member of the Department of Orthopaedic Surgery at Case Western Reserve University. He is a research associate for the Cleveland Museum of Natural History.

Acting as a technical adviser for the Cuyahoga County Coroner's Office in Cleveland, Ohio, he has aided in crime scene analysis and testified as an expert witness in trials.

In off hours, Lovejoy has played in a bluegrass band named "The Purple Mountain Majesty Boys".

== Legacy and honors ==
- Lovejoy serves on the editorial board for Anthropological Science.
- He has been ranked one of the Institute for Scientific Information's "Most Highly Cited" authors in social sciences.
- In 2007, Lovejoy was elected to the United States National Academy of Sciences.

== Publications ==
Among the publications by Lovejoy are the following:

- Lovejoy, C. Owen (1988), "Evolution of Human walking" (PDF), Scientific American, 259 (5): 82–89, Bibcode:1988SciAm.259e.118L, doi:10.1038/scientificamerican1188-118, PMID 3212438.
- Latimer, B., & Lovejoy, C.O. (1989), "The Calcaneus of Australopithecus afarensis and its implications for the Evolution of Bipedality", American Journal of Physical Anthropology, 78 (3): 369–386, doi:10.1002/ajpa.1330780306, PMID 2929741.

== Notes ==
a. Lovejoy uses "Owen" as his given name in less formal contexts.
