= Lucy (hominid) =

3.2-million-year-old fossilized hominid

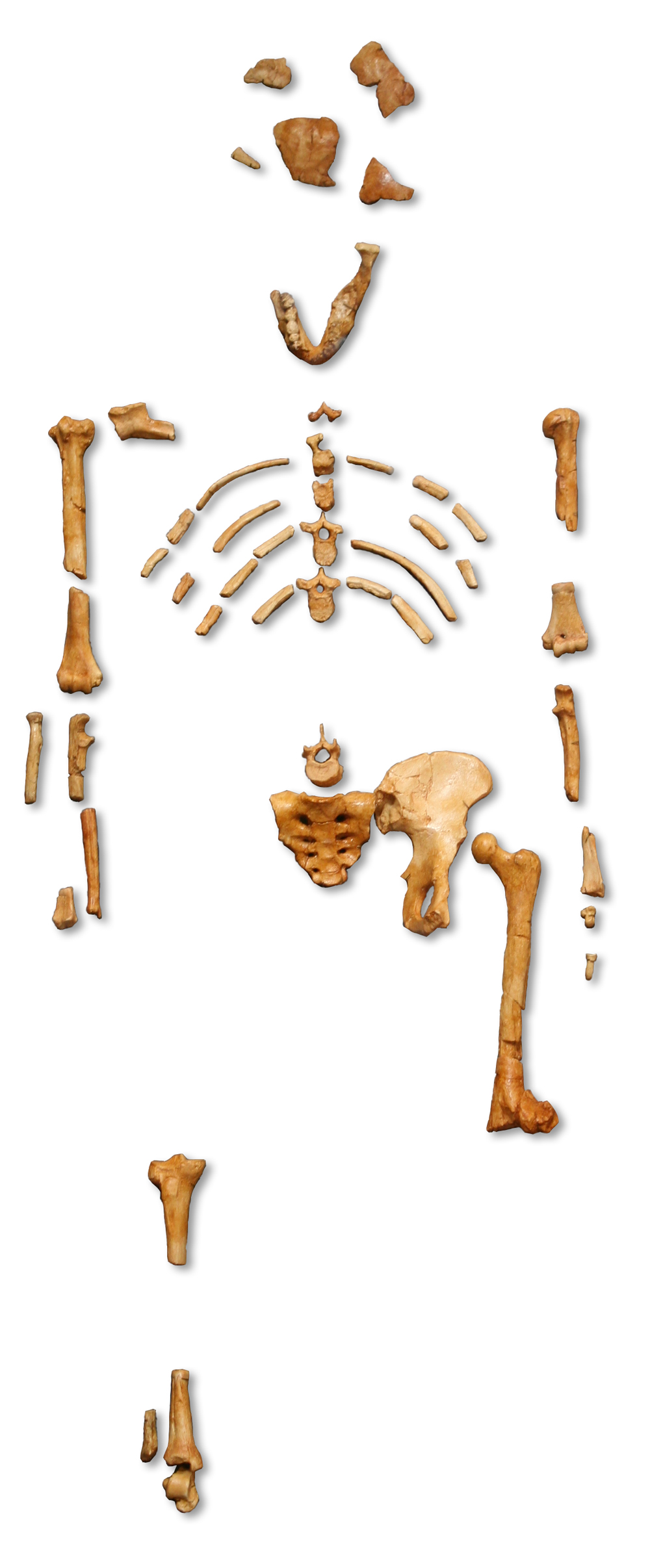
- Catalog no.: AL 288-1
- Common name: Lucy
- Species: Australopithecus afarensis
- Age: 3.2 million years
- Place discovered: Hadar, Ethiopia
- Date discovered: 24 November 1974
- Discovered by: Donald Johanson

AL 288-1, commonly known as Lucy or Dinkʼinesh (Amharic: ድንቅ ነሽ, romanized: dənqə näš, lit. 'you are marvellous'), is a collection of several hundred pieces of fossilized bone comprising 40% of the skeleton of a female of the hominin species Australopithecus afarensis. It was discovered in 1974 in Ethiopia, at Hadar, a site in the Awash Valley of the Afar Triangle by Donald Johanson, a paleoanthropologist of the Cleveland Museum of Natural History.

Lucy is an early australopithecine and lived around 3.2 million years ago. The skeleton presents a small skull akin to that of non-hominin apes, plus evidence of a walking-gait that was bipedal and upright, akin to that of humans and other hominins—which combination supports the view of human evolution that bipedalism preceded increase in brain size. A 2016 study proposes that Australopithecus afarensis was, at least partly, tree-dwelling, though the extent of this behaviour is debated.

Lucy was named by Pamela Alderman as the namesake of the 1967 song "Lucy in the Sky with Diamonds" by the Beatles, which was played loudly and repeatedly in the expedition camp all evening after the excavation team's first day's work on the Hadar recovery site. After public announcement of the discovery, Lucy captured much international interest, becoming a household name at the time.

Lucy became famous worldwide as the story of her discovery and reconstruction was published by Johanson and Edey. Beginning in 2007, the fossil assembly and associated artefacts were exhibited publicly in an extended six-year tour of the United States; the exhibition was called Lucy's Legacy: The Hidden Treasures of Ethiopia. There was discussion of the risks of damage to the unique fossils, and other museums preferred to display casts of the fossil assembly. The original fossils were returned to Ethiopia in 2013, and subsequent exhibitions have used casts.

In 2024, after 50 years of follow-on research, the scientific community was of consensus that Lucy's species was not the earliest known member of the human family. And contrary to earlier beliefs that her species first walked upright in open savanna grasslands, later evidence suggests they walked and survived in grassy woodlands among deciduous trees. Her species adapted to various habitats over millennia, enduring severe changes in climate. Notably, A. afarensis was not alone in its environment. "We have multiple [hominin] species in the same time period," said Yohannes Haile-Selassie, director of the Institute of Human Origins at Arizona State University.

== Discovery ==
Hominin timeline
← / Earlier apes; ← / Gorilla split; ← / Chimpanzee split; ← / Earliest bipedal; ← / Earliest sign of Ardipithecus; ← / Earliest sign of Australopithecus; ← / Earliest stone tools; ← / Earliest sign of Homo; ← / Dispersal beyond Africa; ← / Earliest fire / cooking; ← / Earliest rock art; ← / Earliest clothes; ← / Modern humans
(million years ago)

=== Background controversy ===
Ever since the development of evolutionary theory in the early 19th century, biologists recognized that humans must be distantly related to all other species. Without transitional fossils, scientists of that time presumed that humans' closest relatives were the great apes. They speculated that the first traits to evolve after speciation would be related to increasing intelligence: big brains, tool use, complex language. Bipedality was not envisioned among the likely early traits.

In 1924, Raymond Dart discovered the Taung child; which skeleton seemed bipedal (i.e., not like chimps), but lacked skull space for a powerful brain. But without further data to contextualize Dart's find, anthropologists could not agree on whether bipedality, intelligence, or some other trait first distinguished proto-humans from their great ape relatives.

=== Organizing the expedition ===
French geologist and paleoanthropologist Maurice Taieb discovered the Hadar Formation for paleoanthropology in 1970 in the Afar Triangle of Ethiopia; he recognized its potential as a likely repository of the fossils and artifacts of human origins. Taieb formed the International Afar Research Expedition (IARE) and invited three prominent international scientists to conduct research expeditions into the region. Under his directorship, these were: Donald Johanson (co-director)—an American paleoanthropologist and curator at the Cleveland Museum of Natural History, who later founded the Institute of Human Origins, now of Arizona State University; Yves Coppens (1934–2022, co-director)—a French paleoanthropologist and professor at the Collège de France, considered France's most prestigious research establishment; and Mary Leakey, the noted British paleoanthropologist.

An expedition was soon mounted with an additional seven French and four American participants. In the autumn of 1973 the team began surveying sites around Hadar for signs related to the origin of humans.

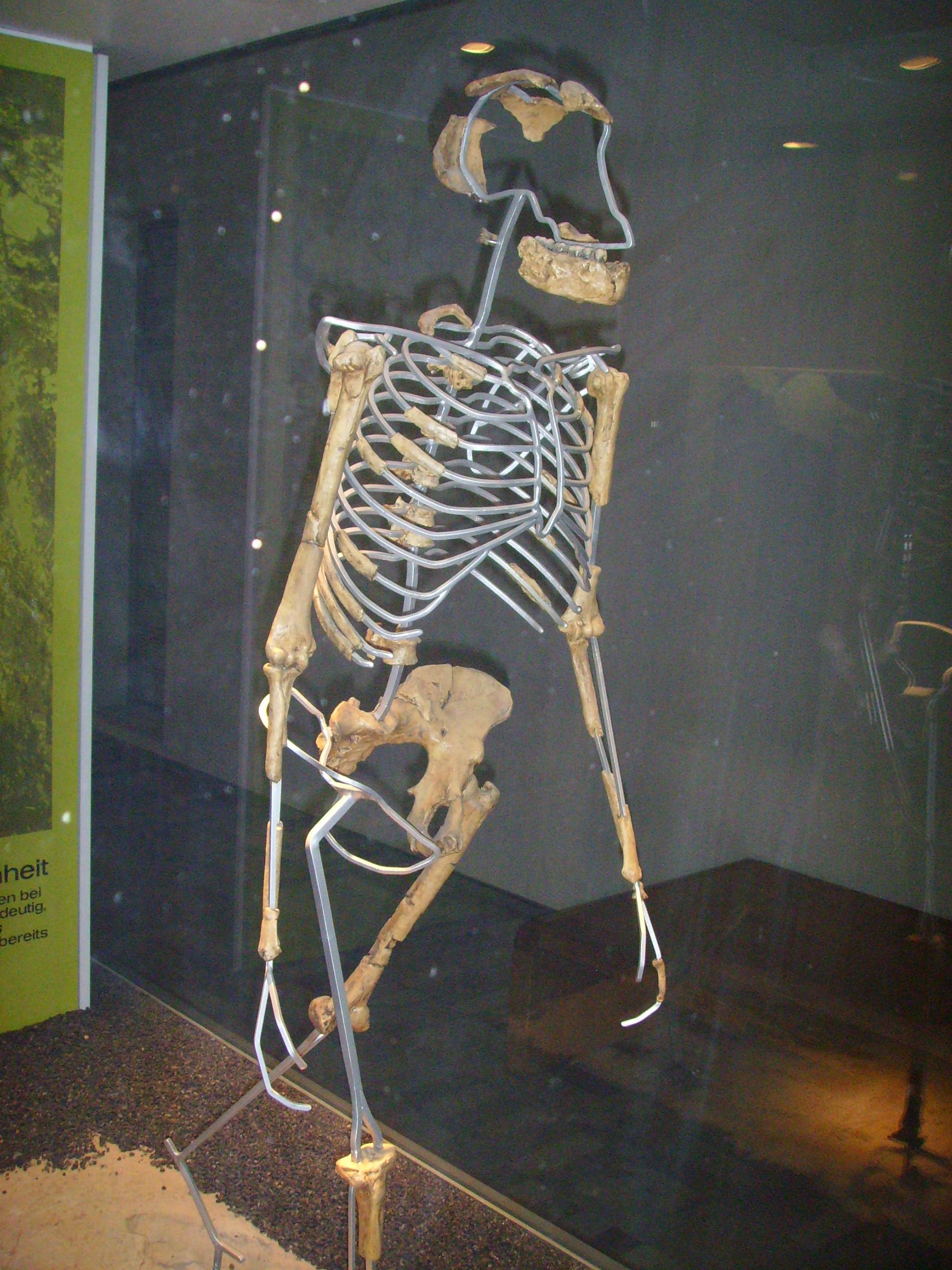
Side view of cast of Lucy in the Naturmuseum Senckenberg

=== First find ===
In November 1973, near the end of the first field season, Johanson noticed a fossil of the upper end of a shinbone that had been sliced slightly at the front. The lower end of a femur was found near it, and when he fitted them together the angle of the knee joint clearly showed that this fossil, AL 129-1, was an upright–walking hominin. AL 129-1 was later dated to around 3.4 million years old—much older than other hominin fossils known at the time. The site lay about 2.5 kilometres (1.6 mi) from the site where "Lucy" subsequently was found, in a rock stratum 60 metres (200 ft) deeper than that in which the Lucy fragments were found.

=== Subsequent findings ===
The team returned for the second field season the following year and found hominin jaws. Then, on the morning of 24 November 1974, near the Awash River, Johanson abandoned a plan to update his field notes and joined graduate student Tom Gray to search Locality 162 for bone fossils.

By Johanson's later (published) accounts, both he and Tom Gray spent two hours on the arid and increasingly hot plain, surveying the dusty terrain. On a hunch, Johanson decided to look at the bottom of a small gully that had been checked at least twice before by other workers. Nothing was immediately visible, but as they turned to leave, a fossil caught Johanson's eye; an arm bone fragment was lying on the slope. Near it lay a fragment from the back of a small skull. They noticed part of a femur (thigh bone) a few feet (about one meter) away. As they explored further they found more and more bones on the slope, including vertebrae, part of a pelvis, ribs, and pieces of jaw. They marked the spot and returned to camp, excited at finding so many pieces apparently from one individual hominin.

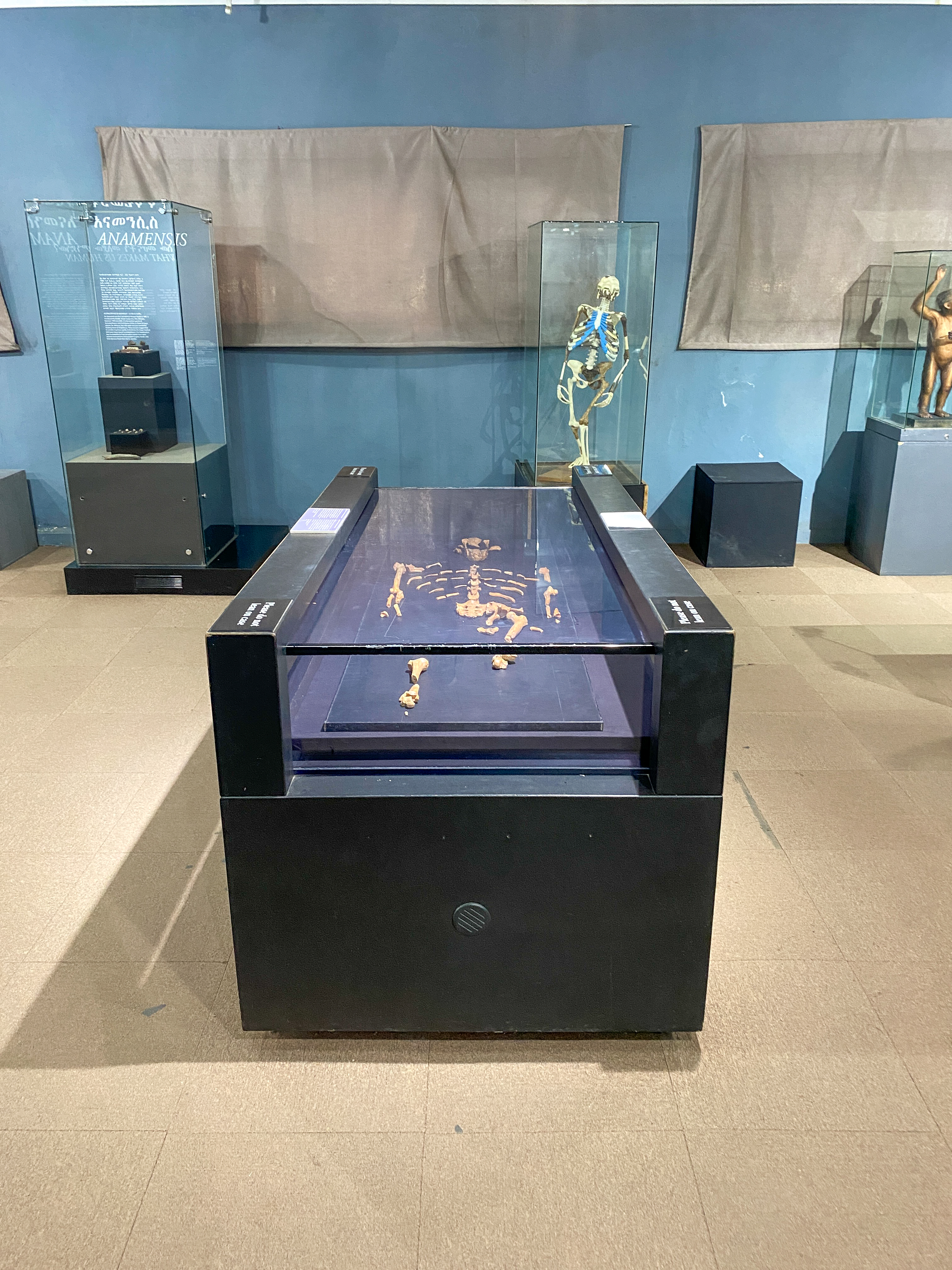
An exact replica of Lucy at the National Museum of Ethiopia, Addis Ababa, Ethiopia. The original is kept in a safe vault at that museum.

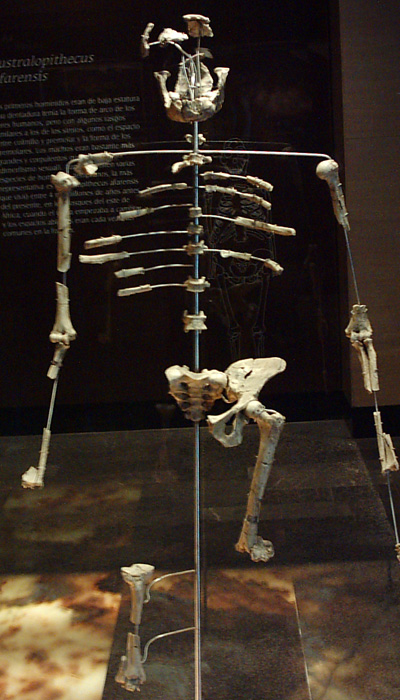
Cast of Lucy at the National Museum of Anthropology in Mexico City

In the afternoon, all members of the expedition returned to the gully to section off the site and prepare it for careful excavation and collection, which eventually took three weeks. That first evening they celebrated at the camp; and at some stage during the evening they named fossil AL 288-1 "Lucy", after the Beatles' song "Lucy in the Sky with Diamonds" (1967), which was being played loudly and repeatedly on a tape recorder in the camp.

Over the next three weeks the team found several hundred pieces or fragments of bone with no duplication, which confirmed their original speculation that the pieces were from a single individual. Ultimately, it was determined that 40% of a hominin skeleton was recovered at the site. Johanson assessed it as female based on the one complete pelvic bone and sacrum, which indicated the width of the pelvic opening.

=== Assembling the pieces ===
Lucy was 1.1 m (3 ft 7 in) tall, weighed 29 kg (64 lb), and (after reconstruction) looked somewhat like a chimpanzee. She had a small brain like a chimpanzee, but the pelvis and leg bones were almost identical in function to those of modern humans, showing with certainty that Lucy's species were hominins that had stood upright and erect in their walking gait.

=== Reconstruction in Cleveland ===
With the permission of the government of Ethiopia, Johanson brought all the skeletal fragments to the Cleveland Museum of Natural History in Ohio, where they were stabilized and reconstructed by anthropologist Claude Lovejoy, and where "Lucy" captured much public notice. Some nine years later, and fully assembled, she was returned to Ethiopia.

=== Later discoveries ===
Additional finds of A. afarensis were made during the 1970s and forward, gaining for anthropologists a better understanding of the ranges of morphic variability and sexual dimorphism within the species. A more complete skeleton of a related hominid, Ardipithecus, was found in the same Awash Valley in 1992. "Ardi", like "Lucy", was a hominid-becoming-hominin species, but, lived around 4.4 million years ago, it had evolved much earlier than the afarensis species. Excavation, preservation, and analysis of the specimen Ardi was very difficult and time-consuming; work was begun in 1992, with the results not fully published until October 2009.

== Fossil age estimates ==
Initial attempts were made in 1974 by Maurice Taieb and James Aronson in Aronson's laboratory at Case Western Reserve University to estimate the age of the fossils using the potassium-argon radiometric dating method. These efforts were hindered by several factors: the rocks in the recovery area were chemically altered or reworked by volcanic activity; datable crystals were very scarce in the sample material; and there was a complete absence of pumice clasts at Hadar. (The Lucy skeleton occurs in the part of the Hadar sequence that accumulated with the fastest rate of deposition, which partly accounts for her excellent preservation.)

Fieldwork at Hadar was suspended in the winter of 1976–1977. When it was resumed thirteen years later in 1990, the more precise argon-argon technology had been updated by Derek York at the University of Toronto. By 1992 Aronson and Robert Walter had found two suitable samples of volcanic ash—the older layer of ash was about 18 m below the fossil and the younger layer was only one meter below, closely marking the age of deposition of the specimen. These samples were argon-argon dated by Walter in the geochronology laboratory of the Institute of Human Origins at 3.22 and 3.18 million years.

== Skeletal characteristics ==
=== Ambulation ===
One of the most striking characteristics of the Lucy skeleton is a valgus knee, which indicates that she normally moved by walking upright. Her femur presents a mix of ancestral and derived traits. The femoral head is small and the femoral neck is short; both are primitive traits. The greater trochanter, however, is clearly a derived trait, being short and human-like – even though, unlike in humans, it is situated higher than the femoral head. The length ratio of her humerus (arm) to femur (thigh) is 84.6%, which compares to 71.8% for modern humans, and 97.8% for common chimpanzees, indicating that either the arms of A. afarensis were beginning to shorten, the legs were beginning to lengthen, or both were occurring simultaneously. Lucy also had a lordose curve, or lumbar curve, another indicator of habitual bipedalism. She apparently had physiological flat feet, not to be confused with pes planus or any pathology, even though other afarensis individuals appear to have had arched feet.

Mounted skeleton reconstructions
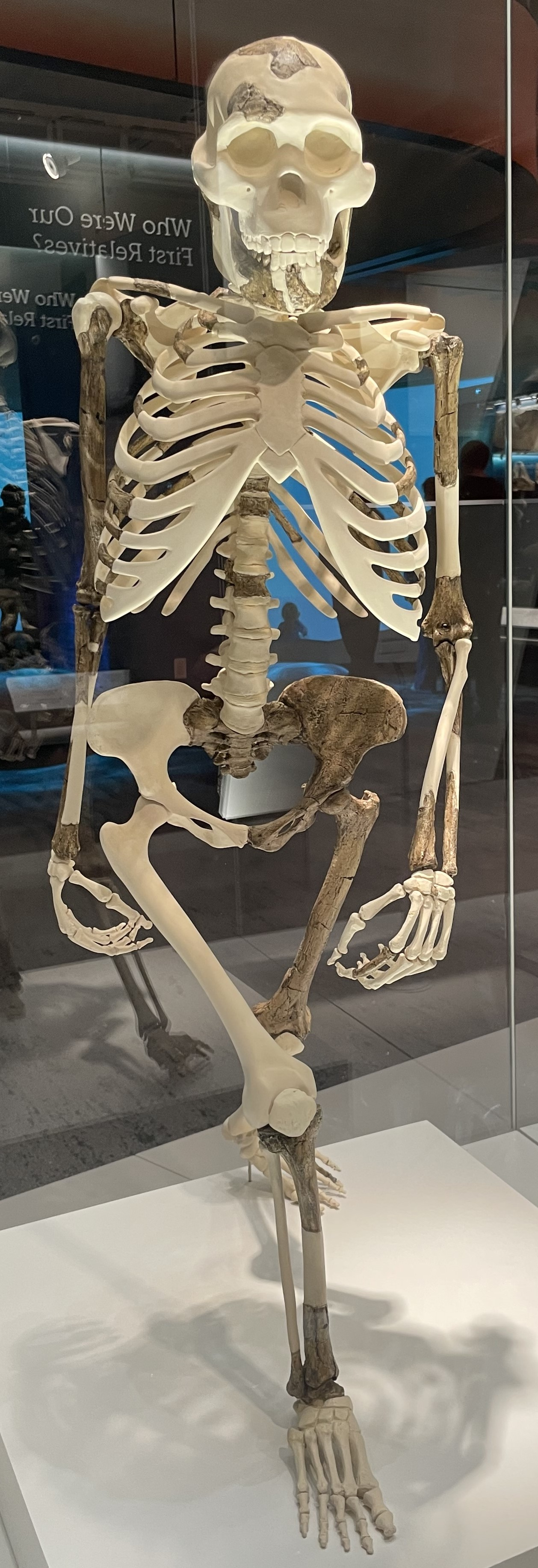
Lucy skeleton reconstruction at the Cleveland Museum of Natural History, front view

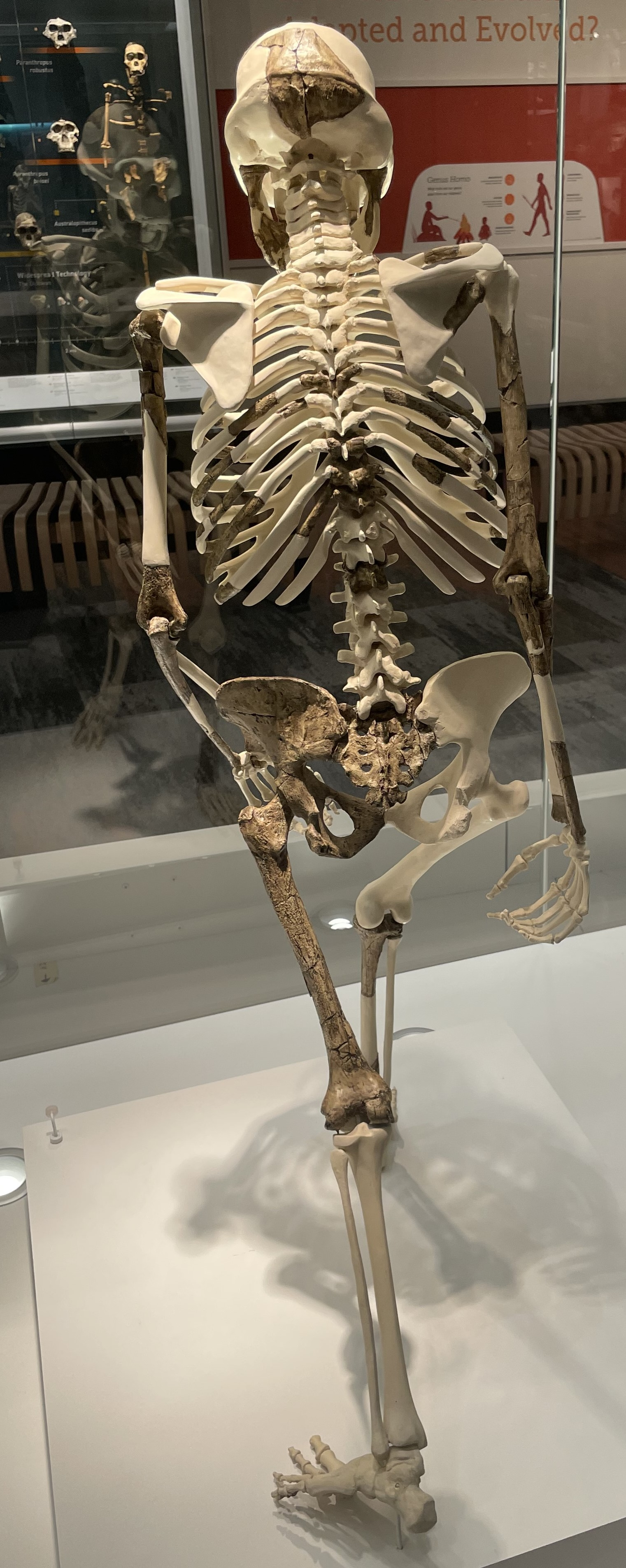
Lucy skeleton reconstruction at the Cleveland Museum of Natural History, rear view

Interactive 3D model of the skeleton reconstruction at the Natural History Museum of Geneva.

Turntable of the skeleton reconstruction at the Natural History Museum of Geneva

=== Pelvic girdle ===
Johanson recovered Lucy's left innominate bone and sacrum. Though the sacrum was remarkably well preserved, the innominate was distorted, leading to two different reconstructions. The first reconstruction had little iliac flare and virtually no anterior wrap, creating an ilium that greatly resembled that of an ape. However, this reconstruction proved to be faulty, as the superior pubic rami would not have been able to connect were the right ilium identical to the left.

A later reconstruction by Tim White showed a broad iliac flare and a definite anterior wrap, indicating that Lucy had an unusually broad inner acetabular distance and unusually long superior pubic rami. Her pubic arch was over 90 degrees and derived; that is, similar to modern human females. Her acetabulum, however, was small and primitive.

=== Sacrum and spine ===
While examining Lucy's fossilized remains, it was believed that Lucy's sacrum had five fused elements. The sacrum was found to be in good condition with little damage done. Although the sacrum had five fused elements, the transverse processes of the most caudal element were not seen to connect to the segments craniad to it. Researchers concluded that the sacrum suffered fossil damage which led to the fifth segment not connecting.

Although this was the case, in the mid-2010s studies came out with new theories as to why Lucy's fifth sacral segment is in that shape. Some researchers conclude that Lucy has only four sacral segments. Published in the American Journal of Physical Anthropology, researchers suggest that fossil damage did not shorten the transverse process and that Lucy's sacrum was in this state from the beginning. This specific study points to Lucy's sacrum having four sacral segments which researchers say conforms with the "long-back" model of hominoid vertebral evolution. There are some disagreements in the community about the fifth sacral segment and if fossil damage was enough to change the fifth segment or if it was originally in that state. Discussed in the Journal, researchers conclude that Lucy having only four sacral segments is consistent with other findings related to early Miocene hominoids.

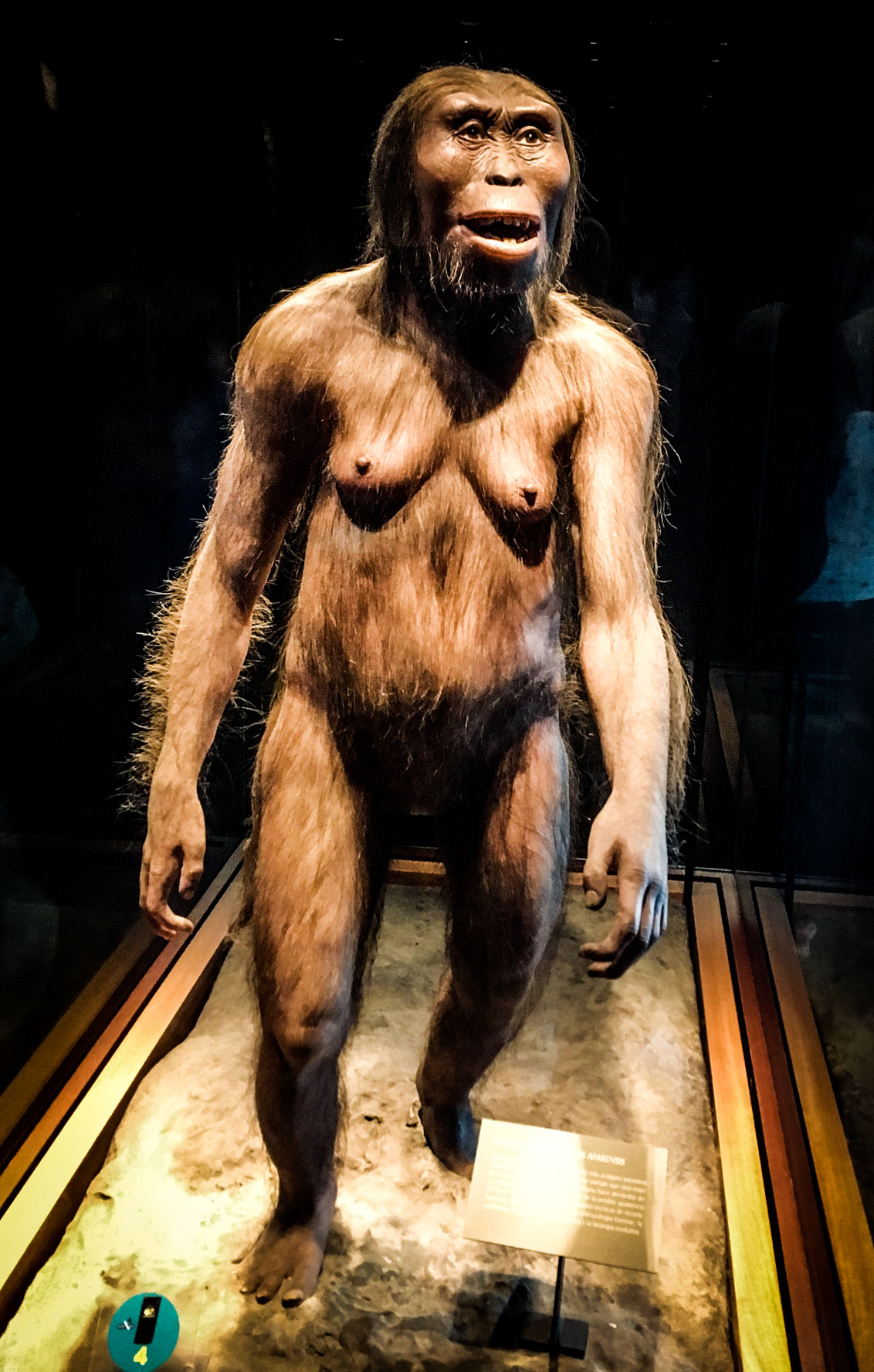
Reconstruction of Lucy at the National Museum of Anthropology in Mexico

Lucy's fossil is associated with approximately 9 vertebrae. Although Lucy was found with a relatively intact and well preserved sacrum, she was missing pieces in her spinal column. Lucy's discoverers and later workers had given the vertebrae provisional level assignments to locations within the vertebral column. Some vertebrae were in worse conditions than others. Lucy had a worn out upper thoracic neutral arch. Researchers have yet to find a cause as to why this particular vertebrae was in worse condition than the other pieces. While accessing and restructuring Lucy's spinal column, it was noted to have been missing pieces that leave it incomplete. Not including an oddly worn out upper thoracic neutral arch, and the lumbar vertebrae, the other remaining thoracic vertebrae were compiled to form an incomplete formation. The formation was arranged from the sixth thoracic vertebrae (T6) to its caudal end (T12), with the seventh thoracic vertebrae (T7) missing. As of 2015, the continuity differs in the thoracic series between researchers and is being re-evaluated. Although new studies and reassessments are being done, they do not refute previous work or conclusions about Lucy's spine.

=== Cranial specimens ===
The cranial evidence recovered from Lucy is far less derived than her postcranium. Her neurocranium is small and primitive, while she possesses more spatulate canines than other apes. The cranial capacity was about 375 to 500 cubic centimeters.

=== Rib cage and plant-based diet ===
Australopithecus afarensis seems to have had the same conical rib-cage found in today's non-human great apes (like the chimpanzee and gorilla), which allows room for a large stomach and the longer intestine needed for digesting voluminous plant matter. Fully 60% of the blood supply of non-human apes is used in the digestion process, greatly impeding the development of brain function (which is limited thereby to using about 10% of the circulation). The heavier musculature of the jaws—those muscles operating the intensive masticatory process for chewing plant material—similarly would also limit development of the braincase. During evolution of the human lineage these muscles seem to have weakened with the loss of the myosin gene MYH16, a two base-pair deletion that occurred possibly about 2.4 million years ago.

=== Other findings ===
Lucy in the National Museum of Ethiopia

A study of the mandible across a number of specimens of A. afarensis indicated that Lucy's jaw was rather unlike other hominins, having a more gorilla-like appearance. Rak et al. concluded that this morphology arose "independently in gorillas and hominins", and that A. afarensis is "too derived to occupy a position as a common ancestor of both the Homo and robust australopith clades".

Work at the American Museum of Natural History uncovered a possible Theropithecus vertebral fragment that was found mixed in with Lucy's vertebrae, but confirmed the remainder belonged to her.

== Death ==
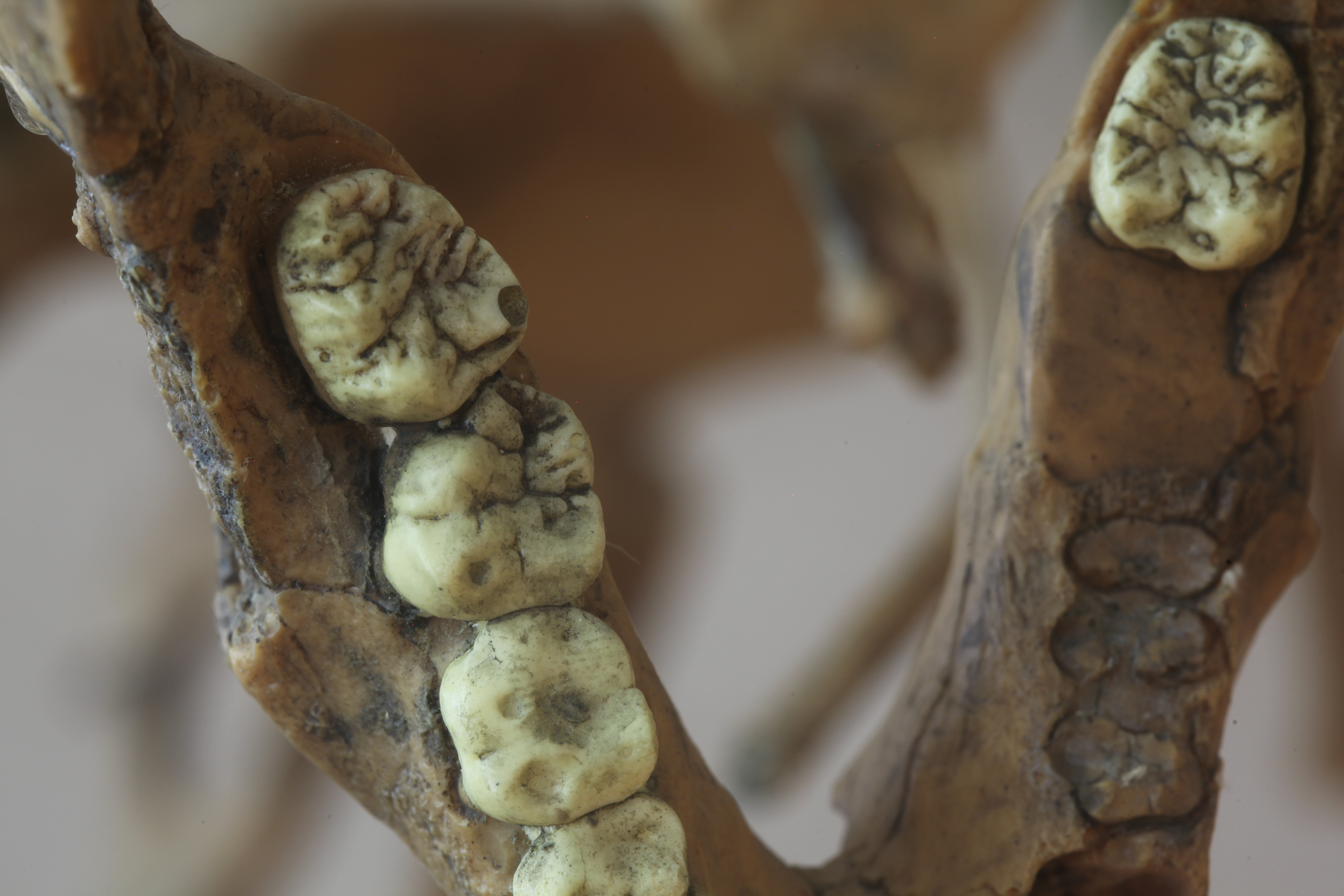
View of the teeth on a cast of the skeleton (Museum of Geneva)

Lucy's cause of death has not been determined. The specimen does not show the signs of post-mortem bone damage characteristic of animals killed by predators and then scavenged. The only visible damage is a single carnivore tooth mark on the top of her left pubic bone, believed to have occurred at or around the time of death, but which was not necessarily related to her death. Her third molars were erupted and slightly worn and, therefore it was concluded that she was fully matured with completed skeletal development. There are indications of degenerative disease to her vertebrae that do not necessarily indicate old age. It is believed that she was a mature but young adult when she died.

In 2016, researchers at the University of Texas at Austin suggested that Lucy died after falling from a tall tree. However, Donald Johanson and Tim White disagreed with this conclusion.

== Exhibitions ==
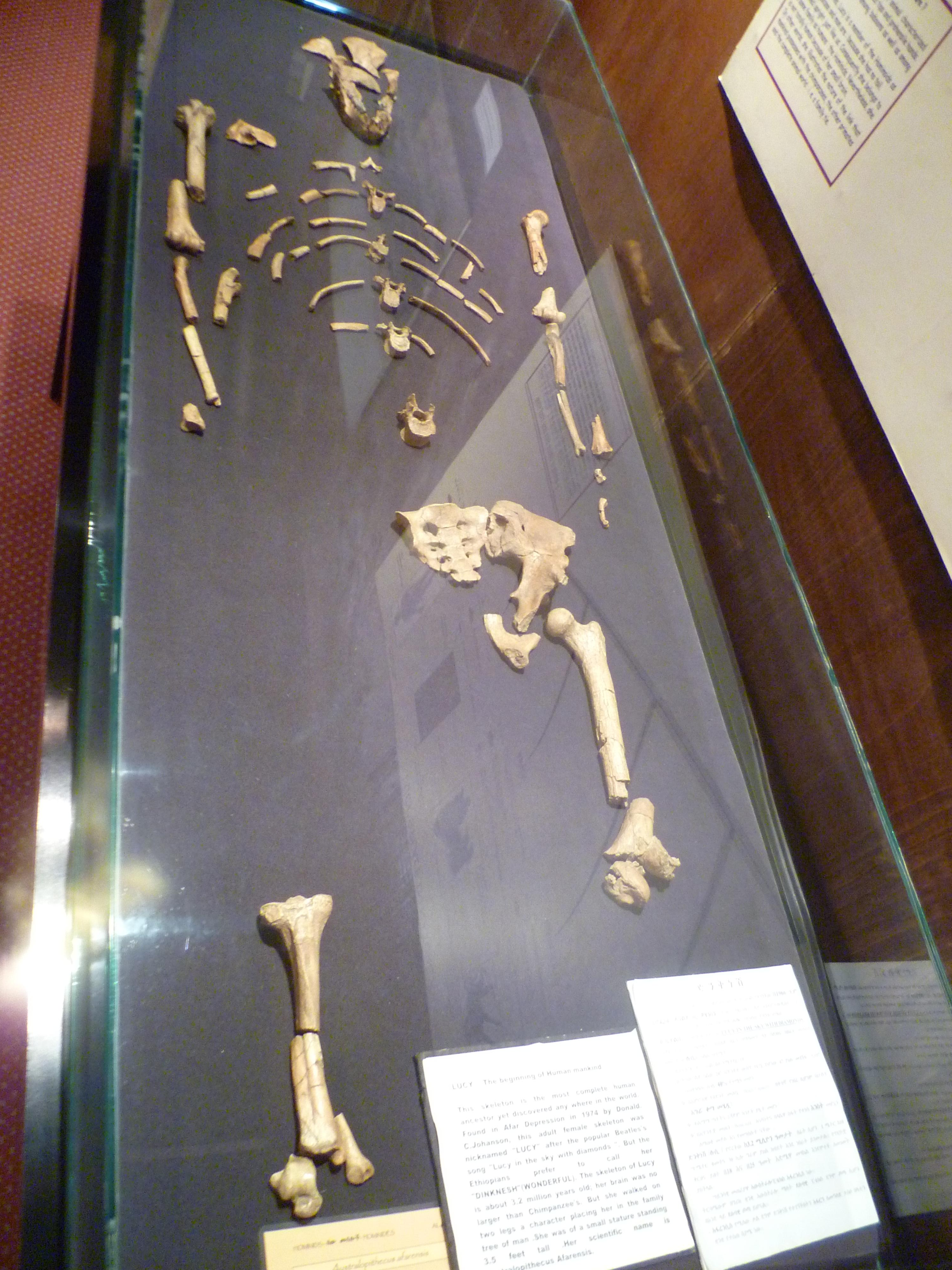
Lucy in the National Museum of Ethiopia

The Lucy skeleton is preserved at the National Museum of Ethiopia in Addis Ababa. A plaster replica is publicly displayed there instead of the original skeleton. A cast of the original skeleton in its reconstructed form is displayed at the Cleveland Museum of Natural History. At the American Museum of Natural History in New York City a diorama presents Australopithecus afarensis and other human predecessors, showing each species and its habitat and explaining the behaviors and capabilities assigned to each. A cast of the skeleton as well as a corpus reconstruction of Lucy is displayed at The Field Museum in Chicago.

=== US tour ===
A six-year exhibition tour of the United States was undertaken during 2007–13; it was titled Lucy's Legacy: The Hidden Treasures of Ethiopia and it featured the actual Lucy fossil reconstruction and over 100 artifacts from prehistoric times to the present. The tour was organized by the Houston Museum of Natural Science and was approved by the Ethiopian government and the US State Department. A portion of the proceeds from the tour was designated to modernizing Ethiopia's museums.

There was controversy in advance of the tour over concerns about the fragility of the specimens, with various experts including paleoanthropologist Owen Lovejoy and anthropologist and conservationist Richard Leakey publicly stating their opposition, while discoverer Don Johanson, despite concerns for the possibility of damage, felt the tour would raise awareness of human origins studies. The Smithsonian Institution, Cleveland Museum of Natural History and other museums declined to host the exhibits.

The Houston Museum made arrangements for exhibiting at ten other museums, including the Pacific Science Center in Seattle. In September 2008, between the exhibits in Houston and Seattle, the skeletal assembly was taken to the University of Texas at Austin for 10 days to perform high-resolution CT scans of the fossils.

Lucy was exhibited at the Discovery Times Square Exposition in New York City from June until October 2009. In New York, the exhibition included Ida (Plate B), the other half of the recently announced Darwinius masilae fossil. She was also exhibited in Mexico at the Mexico Museum of Anthropology until its return to Ethiopia in May 2013.

=== Czech tour ===
In August 2025, Lucy, along with another hominid fossil, Selam, were transported to the Czech Republic for a two-month exhibition at the Czech National Museum in Prague.

== See also ==
- Ardi – more complete skeleton of earlier hominin species
- Dawn of Humanity – 2015 PBS documentary
- "Walking with Cavemen" – 2003 BBC documentary
- List of human evolution fossils
- Prehistoric Autopsy – 2012 BBC documentary
- Selam (Australopithecus) – young female A. afarensis fossil from Ethiopia
- Lucy (spacecraft) – the NASA mission launched in 2021 to study Trojan asteroids described as fossils of the early solar system.
