= Maurice Taieb =

Tunisian French geologist and paleoanthropologist (1935–2021)

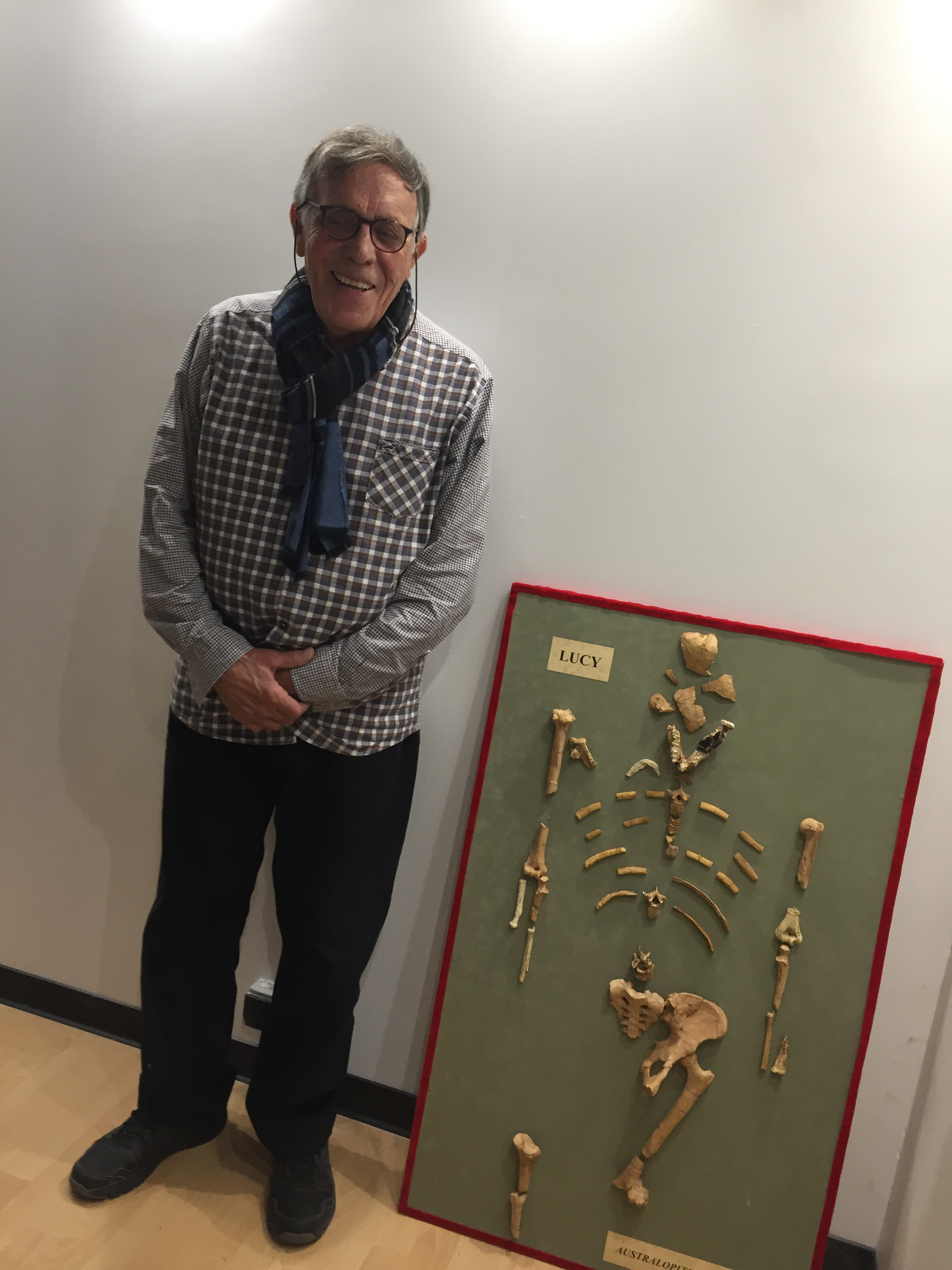
- Taieb in 2020
- Born: 22 July 1935; Bizerte, Tunisia
- Died: 23 July 2021 (aged 86); Marseille, France

Maurice Taieb (22 July 1935 – 23 July 2021) was a Tunisian French geologist and paleoanthropologist. He discovered the Hadar formation, recognized its potential importance to paleoanthropology and founded the International Afar Research Expedition (IARE). This enabled co-director Donald Johanson to discover an early hominin fossil, the 3.2-million-year-old Australopithecine Lucy in the Awash Valley of Ethiopia's Afar Depression.

== Personal life ==
Taieb was born in Tunisia in 1935 to a Tunisian father and a French mother. He travelled through the North African outback with his uncle, a merchant who traded with the Bedouin on the outskirts of Tunis.

Taieb received his doctorate from the University of Paris VI in 1974. His thesis was on the geology of the Awash Riverbasin.

Taieb died on 23 July 2021, and was survived by his wife Ingrid and their two sons, Laurent and Jean Marc.

== Career ==
In 1966, Taieb started his geological exploration of the Afar Region of Ethiopia by Land Rover and donkey. While others report that he first arrived in Hadar in 1970, he later claimed to have discovered the Hadar fossil fields in 1968. In 1972, Taieb founded the IARE, and was present two years later when Donald Johanson discovered fossil fragments of Lucy. Australopithecus | Lucy.

Along with co-directors of IARE Johanson and Yves Coppens, Taieb played a key role in identifying the geology and history of the Afar Region. The area has yielded hominid and hominin specimens dated at 6 million years old.

Taieb was Director of Research for the National Centre for Scientific Research (Centre National de la Recherche Scientifique) (CNRS), at the European Centre of Research and Teaching of Geosciences of the Environment (Centre Européen de Recherche et d'Enseignement de Géosciences de l'Environnement) (CEREGE), in Aix-en-Provence.
