= Donald Johanson =

American paleoanthropologist

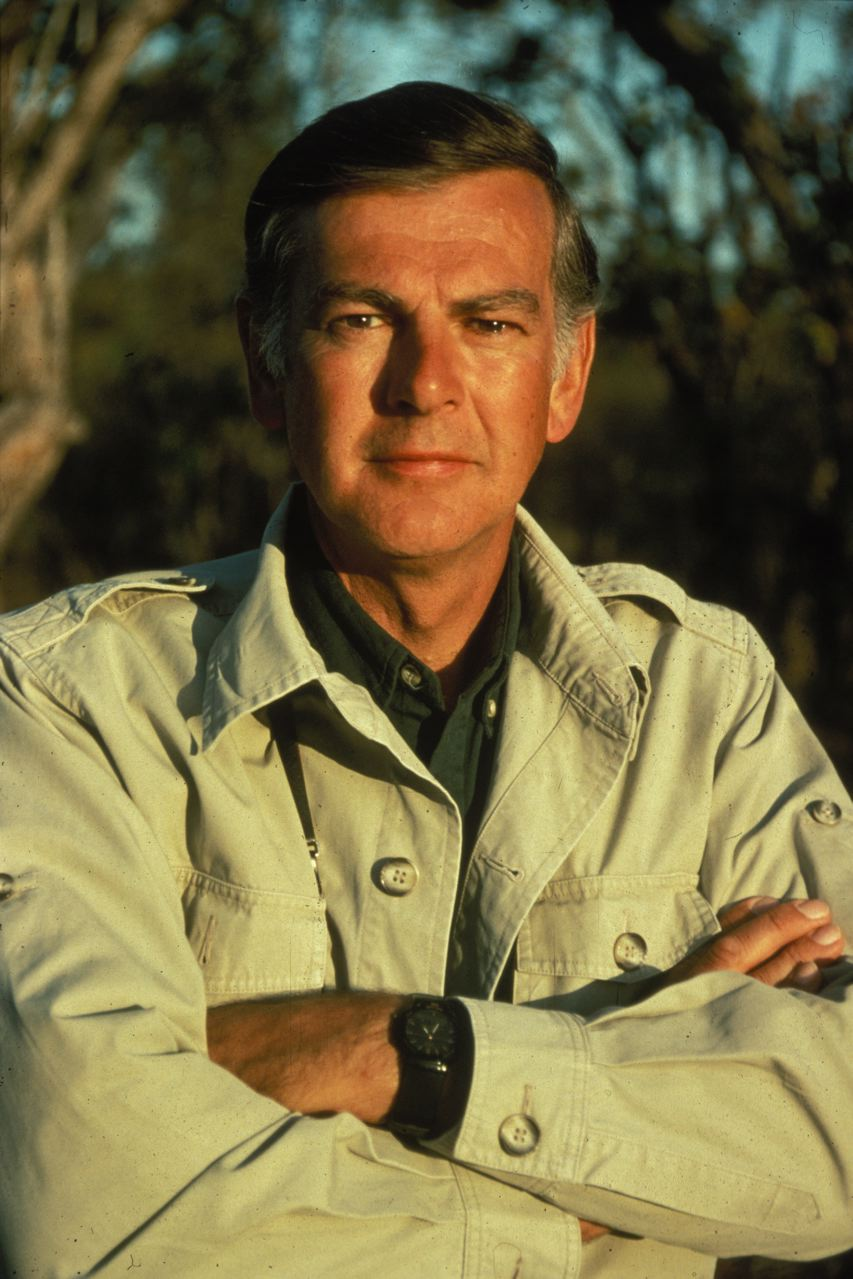
- Born: Donald Carl Johanson; June 28, 1943 (age 83); Chicago, Illinois, U.S.
- Education: University of Illinois at Urbana–Champaign; University of Chicago
- Known for: Discovery of a new hominid, Australopithecus afarensis ("Lucy")
- Scientific career
- Fields: Paleoanthropology
- Workplaces: Arizona State University

Donald Carl Johanson (born June 28, 1943) is an American paleoanthropologist. He is best known for discovering the fossil of a female hominin australopithecine known as "Lucy" in the Afar Triangle region of Hadar, Ethiopia.

== Biography ==
=== Early life and education ===
Johanson was born in Chicago, Illinois to Swedish parents. He is the nephew of wrestler Ivar Johansson.

He earned a bachelor's degree from the University of Illinois at Urbana–Champaign in 1966 and his master's degree (1970) and PhD (1974) from the University of Chicago. At the time of the discovery of Lucy, he was an associate professor of anthropology at Case Western Reserve University. In 1981, he established the Institute of Human Origins in Berkeley, California, which he moved to Arizona State University in 1997. Johanson holds an honorary doctorate from Case Western Reserve University and was awarded an honorary doctorate by Westfield State College in 2008.

=== "Lucy" ===
Johanson interviewed at the 40th anniversary of Lucy's discovery

Lucy was discovered in Hadar, Ethiopia on November 24, 1974, when Johanson, coaxed away from his paperwork by graduate student Tom Gray for a spur-of-the-moment survey, caught the glint of a white fossilized bone out of the corner of his eye and recognized it as hominin. Forty percent of the skeleton was eventually recovered and was later described as the first known member of Australopithecus afarensis. Johanson was astonished to find so much of her skeleton all at once. Pamela Alderman, a member of the expedition, suggested she be named "Lucy" after the Beatles' song "Lucy in the Sky with Diamonds," which was played repeatedly during the night of the discovery.

A bipedal hominin, Lucy stood about three and a half feet tall; her bipedalism supported Raymond Dart's theory that australopithecines walked upright. The whole team including Johanson concluded from Lucy's rib that she ate a plant-based diet and from her curved finger bones that she was probably still at home in trees. They did not immediately see Lucy as a separate species, but considered her an older member of Australopithecus africanus. The subsequent discovery of several more skulls of similar morphology persuaded most palaeontologists to classify her as a species called afarensis.

Johanson and Maitland A. Edey won a 1982 U.S. National Book Award in Science (Note: This was the 1982 award for paperback Science. From 1980 to 1983 in National Book Awards history there were dual hardcover and paperback awards in most categories, and multiple nonfiction subcategories. Most of the paperback award-winners were reprints of books eligible for previous awards but the 1982 Science was original, Taking the Quantum Leap by Fred Alan Wolf.) for the first popular book about this work, Lucy: The Beginnings of Humankind.

=== "First Family" ===
AL 333, commonly referred to as the "First Family", is a collection of prehistoric homininid teeth and bones of at least thirteen individuals that Johanson's team also discovered in Hadar in 1975. Generally thought to be members of the species Australopithecus afarensis, the fossils are estimated to be about 3.2 million years old.

=== Awards and honors ===
- In 1976, Johanson received the Golden Plate Award of the American Academy of Achievement.
- In 1991, the Committee for Skeptical Inquiry (CSICOP) awarded Johanson their highest honor, the In Praise of Reason award.
- On October 19, 2014, Johanson gave the second annual Patrusky Lecture.
- On October 24, 2014, Johanson accepted the "Emperor Has No Clothes" award at the Freedom From Religion Foundation 37th annual convention.
- Asteroid 52246 Donaldjohanson, a target of the Lucy mission was named in his honor. The official naming citation was published by the Minor Planet Center on December 25, 2015 (M.P.C. 97569).

=== Other activities ===
Since 2013, Johanson has been listed on the Advisory Council of the National Center for Science Education.

== Bibliography ==
- Johanson, Donald; Maitland Edey (1981). Lucy: The Beginnings of Humankind. New York: Simon and Schuster. ISBN 0-671-25036-1.
- Johanson, Donald; James Shreeve (1989). Lucy's Child: The Discovery of a Human Ancestor. London: Viking. ISBN 0-670-83366-5.
- Johanson, Donald; Blake Edgar (1996). From Lucy to Language. New York: Simon & Schuster. ISBN 0-684-81023-9.
- Johanson, Donald; Giancarlo Ligabue (1999). Ecce Homo: Writings in Honour of Third Millennium Man. Milan: Electa. ISBN 88-435-7170-2.
- Johanson, Donald; Kate Wong (2009). Lucy's Legacy: The Quest for Human Origins. New York: Harmony Books. ISBN 978-0-307-39639-6.

== See also ==
- Yves Coppens
- Australopithecus afarensis
- Dawn of Humanity (2015 PBS film)
- List of fossil sites (with link directory)
- List of hominina (hominin) fossils (with images)
- Multi-regional origin
- Single-origin hypothesis
