= List of human evolution fossils =

The following tables give an overview of notable finds of homini fossils and remains relating to human evolution, beginning with the formation of the tribe Hominini (the divergence of the human and chimpanzee lineages) in the late Miocene, roughly 7 to 8 million years ago.

This overview is not complete, but shows some of the most important findings. It is rare to find a complete skull or skeleton, and there are thousands of mostly fragmentary fossils, often consisting of single bones or isolated teeth, making it difficult to accurately identify them. The fossils are arranged by approximate age as determined by radiometric dating and/or incremental dating and the species name represents current consensus; if there is no clear scientific consensus the other possible classifications are indicated.

The early fossils shown are not considered ancestors to Homo sapiens but are closely related to ancestors and are therefore important to the study of the lineage. After 1.5 million years ago (extinction of Paranthropus), all fossils shown are human (genus Homo). After 11,500 years ago (11.5 ka, beginning of the Holocene), all fossils shown are Homo sapiens (anatomically modern humans), illustrating recent divergence in the formation of modern human sub-populations.

== Late Miocene (7.2–5.5 million years old) ==
The chimpanzee–human divergence likely took place around 10 to 7 million years ago. The list of fossils begins with Sahelanthropus, dated some 7 million years ago, which may or may not be ancestral to both the human and the chimpanzee lineage, although its status as a hominin or a hominin ancestor remains debated. For the earlier history of the human lineage, see Timeline of human evolution#Hominidae, Hominidae#Phylogeny.

Image	Name	Age (Ma)	Species	Year discovered	Country	Discovered by	Now located at
	TM 266 (Toumai)	7.00–6.00	Sahelanthropus tchadensis	2001	Chad; Site:Djurab Desert	Alain Beauvilain, Fanone Gongdibe, Mahamat Adoum and Ahounta Djimdoumalbaye	N'Djamena (Chad), BEAC
	BAR 1000'00	6.1–5.7	Orrorin tugenensis	2000	Kenya; Site:Lukeino	Martin Pickford, Kiptalam Cheboi, Dominique Gommery, Pierre Mein, Brigitte Senut	
	ALA-VP 1/20	5.65±0.150	Ardipithecus kadabba	1997	Ethiopia; Site:Middle Awash	Yohannes Haile-Selassie	

The Trachilos footprints from the island of Crete as well as the Graecopithecus fossils are not included in the list due to taxonomic uncertainty.

== Pliocene (5.3–2.58 million years old) ==
Image	Name	Age (Ma)	Species	Year discovered	Country	Discovered by	Now located at
	Ardi	4.40	Ardipithecus ramidus	1994	Ethiopia	Yohannes Haile-Selassie	
KNM-LT 329. Replica at Museo Nacional de Ciencias Naturales of Madrid	Lothagam mandible (KNM-LT 329)	4.60±0.40	Australopithecus sp. or undetermined Hominidae	1967	Kenya	Arnold Lewis, Bryan Patterson	
	KNM-TH 13150	4.70±0.55	Orrorin praegens	1984	Kenya	Kiptalam Cheboi	
	KNM-KP 271	4.00	Australopithecus anamensis	1965	Kanapoi, Kenya	Bryan Patterson	
	MRD-VP-1/1	3.80	Australopithecus anamensis	2016	Ethiopia	Ali Bereino	
	Laetoli Footprints	3.70	Bipedal hominin	1976	Tanzania	Mary Leakey	
	Laetoli canine (M42323)	3.5	Australopithecus afarensis	1935	Laetoli, Tanzania	Louis Leakey	Natural History Museum, London (UK)
	LH 4	3.40±0.50	Australopithecus afarensis	1974	Laetoli, Tanzania	Mary Leakey	
	KSD-VP-1/1 (Kadanuumuu)	3.58	Australopithecus afarensis	2005	Ethiopia	Yohannes Haile-Selassie	
	KT-12/H1 (Abel)	3.50	Australopithecus bahrelghazali	1995	Chad	Mamelbaye Tomalta and Michel Brunet	N'Djamena (Chad), BEAC
	KNM-WT 22944 G-J	3.50	Australopithecus sp.	1990	Kenya	Multinational team	National Museums of Kenya
	KNM-WT 40000 (Flat Faced Man)	3.50-3.20	Kenyanthropus platyops	1999	Lake Turkana (West Lake Turkana), Kenya	Justus Erus and Meave Leakey	
	BRT-VP-3/14	3.40±0.10	Australopithecus deyiremeda	2015	Ethiopia	Yohannes Haile-Selassie	
	Stw 573 (Little foot)	3.67	Australopithecus prometheus(?)	1994	Sterkfontein, South Africa	Ronald J. Clarke	
	DIK-1 (Selam)	3.30	Australopithecus afarensis	2000	Ethiopia	Zeresenay Alemseged	
	AL 288-1 (Lucy)	3.20	Australopithecus afarensis	1974	Ethiopia	Tom Gray, Donald Johanson, Yves Coppens and Maurice Taieb	National Museum of Ethiopia
AL 200-1 and AL 400–1. Australopithecus afarensis	AL 200-1	3.10±0.10	Australopithecus afarensis	1975	Afar Region, Ethiopia	Donald Johanson Yves Coppens and Maurice Taieb	
	AL 129-1	3.10±0.10	Australopithecus afarensis	1973	Afar Region, Ethiopia	Donald Johanson	
	AL 444-2	3.00	Australopithecus afarensis	1992	Afar Region, Ethiopia	Yoel Rak	
	LD 350-1	2.775±0.025	Homo(?)	2013	Ethiopia	Chalachew Seyoum	
	Taung 1 (Taung Child)	3.03–2.61	Australopithecus africanus	1924	Buxton-Norlim Limeworks, South Africa	Raymond Dart	University of the Witwatersrand

== Pleistocene ==
=== Lower Paleolithic: 2.58–0.3 million years old ===
	Name	Age (Ma)	Species	Date discovered	Country	Discovered by	Now located at
	KNM-WT 17000 (The Black Skull)	2.50	Paranthropus aethiopicus	1985	Kenya	Alan Walker	
	BOU-VP-12/130	2.50	Australopithecus garhi	1997	Ethiopia	Yohannes Haile-Selassie	
	LD-760	2.63	Australopithecus sp. indet.	2025	Ethiopia		
STS 71	STS 71	2.61–2.07	Australopithecus africanus	1947	Sterkfontein, South Africa	Robert Broom and John T. Robinson	Ditsong National Museum of Natural History
STS 52a and STS 52b	STS 52	2.61–2.07	Australopithecus africanus	1947	Sterkfontein, South Africa	Robert Broom	Ditsong National Museum of Natural History
Original	UR 501 (Uraha jawbone)	2.40±0.10	Homo rudolfensis	1991	Malawi	Tyson Msiska, Timothy Bromage, Friedemann Schrenk	
	STS 5 (Mrs. Ples) (STS 14)	2.07	Australopithecus africanus	1947	Sterkfontein, South Africa	Robert Broom	Ditsong National Museum of Natural History
	DNH 134 (Simon)	2.04	Homo erectus	2015	Drimolen Main Quarry, South Africa	Andy Herries' team (excavated by Richard Curtis, Andy Herries, Angeline Leece; reconstructed by Jesse Martin)	University of the Witwatersrand
	DNH 155	2.04–1.95	Paranthropus robustus	2018	Drimolen Main Quarry, South Africa	Andy Herries and Stephanie Baker's team (first found by Samantha Good and excavated by Samantha Good, Angeline Leece, Stephanie Baker and Andy Herries; reconstructed by Jesse Martin)	University of the Witwatersrand
	DNH 152(Khethi)	2.04–1.95	Paranthropus robustus	2018	Drimolen Main Quarry, South Africa	Andy Herries and Stephanie Baker's team (first part found by Khethi Nkosi. later parts by Amber Jaeger, Eunice Lalunio; reconstructed by Jesse Martin & Angeline Leece)	University of the Witwatersrand
	DNH 7 (Eurydice)	2.04–1.95	Paranthropus robustus	1994	Drimolen, Drimolen Main Quarry, South Africa	R. Smith and André Keyser	University of the Witwatersrand
	KNM-ER 64060	2.03	Homo habilis	2012	Ileret, Kenya		
	KNM-ER 64061	2.02	Homo habilis	2012-2013	Ileret, Kenya		
	TM 1517	2.0	Paranthropus robustus	1938	South Africa	Gert Terblanche	Ditsong National Museum of Natural History
	MH1 (Karabo)	1.98	Australopithecus sediba	2008	Malapa, South Africa	Matthew Berger and Lee Rogers Berger	University of the Witwatersrand
	KNM-ER 1813	1.90	Homo habilis	1973	Kenya	Kamoya Kimeu	
	KNM-ER 1470	1.90	Homo rudolfensis	1972	Kenya	Bernard Ngeneo	
	SK 48	2.25–1.80	Paranthropus robustus	1948	Swartkrans, South Africa	Robert Broom	Ditsong National Museum of Natural History
	SK 46	2.25–1.80	Paranthropus robustus	1949	Swartkrans, South Africa	Robert Broom	Ditsong National Museum of Natural History
	SK 847	2.25–1.80	Homo habilis	1949	Swartkrans, South Africa		Ditsong National Museum of Natural History
Replica made with a 3D printer	OH 24 (Twiggy)	1.80	Homo habilis	1968	Tanzania	Peter Nzube	
	OH 8	1.80	Homo habilis	1960	Olduvai, Tanzania		
	D2700 (Dmanisi Skull 3)	1.81±0.40	Homo erectus	2001	Dmanisi, Georgia	David Lordkipanidze and Abesalom Vekua	
Dmanisi skull 4, D3444	D3444 (Dmanisi Skull 4)	1.81±0.40	Homo erectus	2003	Dmanisi, Georgia	David Lordkipanidze	
Dmanisi skull 5 in situ	D4500 (Dmanisi Skull 5)	1.81±0.40	Homo erectus	2005 (published in 2013)	Dmanisi, Georgia	David Lordkipanidze	
	KNM-ER 62000–62003	1.84±0.60	Homo rudolfensis	2012	Koobi Fora, Kenya	Meave Leakey's team	
	KNM-ER 64062	1.84±0.02	Homo erectus	2013	Ileret, Kenya		
	OH 5 (Zinj or nutcracker man)	1.75	Paranthropus boisei	1959	Tanzania	Mary Leakey	
	OH 7 (Johnny's Child)	1.75	Homo habilis	1960	Tanzania	Jonathan and Mary Leakey	
	StW 53	1.8–1.6	variously A. africanus, H. habilis, H. gautengensis	1976	Sterkfontein, South Africa	A. R. Hughes	University of the Witwatersrand
	KNM-ER 1805	1.74	Homo habilis	1973/4	Kenya	Paul Abell	
	Yuanmou Man	1.70 or 0.60–0.50 (disputed)	Homo erectus	1965	China	Fang Qian	
	KNM-ER 406	1.70	Paranthropus boisei	1969	Kenya	Richard Leakey	
	KNM-ER 732	1.70	Paranthropus boisei	1970	Kenya	Richard Leakey	
	KNM-ER 23000	1.70	Paranthropus boisei	1990	Koobi Fora, Kenya	Benson Kyongo	
	KNM-WT 17400	1.70	Paranthropus boisei	Not known	Lake Turkana (West Lake Turkana) Kenya	unknown	National Museums of Kenya, Nairobi (Kenia)
	KNM-ER 3733	1.63±0.15	Homo ergaster (a.k.a. African Homo erectus)	1975	Kenya		
	Lantian Man	1.62±0.03	Homo erectus	1963	Lantian County, China	Woo Ju-Kang	
	KNM-WT 15000 (Turkana Boy)	1.60	Homo ergaster (a.k.a. African Homo erectus)	1984	Lake Turkana (West Lake Turkana), Kenya	Kamoya Kimeu	Kenya National Museum
Replica of the mandible of Peninj, P. boisei	Peninj Mandible	1.50	Paranthropus boisei	1964	Tanzania	Richard Leakey	
	Ileret Footprints	1.50	Homo erectus	2007-2014	Ileret, Kenya		
KNM-ER 992. Replica. Museo Nacional de Ciencias Naturales in Madrid	KNM-ER 992	1.50	Homo ergaster (a.k.a. African Homo erectus)	1971	Kenya	Richard Leakey	
	KNM-ER 3883	1.57±0.08	Homo erectus	1976	Kenya	Richard Leakey	
	Mojokerto 1 (Mojokerto child)	1.43±0.10	Homo erectus	1936	Indonesia	Andojo, G.H.R. von Koenigswald	
	BL02-J54-100 (Niño de Orce)	1.40	Similar to H. heidelbergensis	Unknown	Spain	Unknown	Museo Arqueológico y Etnológico de Granada
	KGA 10-525	1.40	Paranthropus boisei	1993	Konso-Gardula, Ethiopia	A. Amzaye	
OH 9, partial skull	OH 9 (Chellean Man)	1.40	Homo erectus	1960	Olduvai, Tanzania	Louis Leakey	
	Sima del Elephante maxilla (ATE7-1)	1.40	Homo erectus?	2022	Spain		Not on display
	OH 80	1.34	Paranthropus boisei	2010	Olduvai Gorge, Tanzania	Manuel Dominguez-Rodrigo	National Museum of Tanzania
The Mandible of Sima del Elefante (Atapuerca)	ATE9-1	1.20	Homo sp. or Homo erectus?	2008	Spain	Eudald Carbonell	Museo de la Evolución Humana, Burgos (Spain)
The Kocabas hominin calvaria	Kocabaş	1.10	Homo erectus	2002	Turkey	M. Cihat Alçiçek	
	Daka	1.00	Homo erectus	1997	Ethiopia	Henry Gilbert	
	Sangiran 4	1.00	Homo erectus	1939	Indonesia	G.H.R. von Koenigswald	
	Sangiran 2	1.15±0.45	Homo erectus	1937	Indonesia	G.H.R. von Koenigswald	
Madam Buya	Madam Buya	1.00	Homo erectus	1997	Eritrea	Ernesto Abbate	National Museum of Eritrea
	ATD6-15 and ATD6-69 (Niño de la Gran Dolina 342)	0.900	Homo antecessor or Homo erectus	1994	Spain	Bermúdez & Arsuaga	Museo de la Evolución Humana, Burgos (Spain)
	Trinil 2 Pithecanthropus-1 or Java Man	0.850±0.150	Homo erectus	1891	Indonesia	Eugène Dubois	Naturalis Biodiversity Center, Leiden
Mandible Ternifine III	Ternifine 2-3 now Tighennif	0.70	Homo erectus	1954	Algeria	C. Arambourg & B. Hoffstetter	
	Sangiran 17	0.70	Homo erectus	1969	Indonesia	S. Sartono	
	Peking Man	0.73±0.50	Homo erectus	1921	China	Davidson Black	Lost/stolen
	Heidel	0.60	Homo aeserniensis or Homo heidelbergensis	2014	Italy		National Paleolithic Museum of Isernia
	Nanjing Man	0.60±0.02	Homo erectus	1993	China	Liu Luhong	
	Bodo	0.600	Homo heidelbergensis or Homo erectus	1976	Ethiopia	A. Asfaw	
	Benjamina (Cranium 14 / SH 14)	0.53	Homo neanderthalensis	2001-2001	Spain	Ana Gracia Téllez	Museo de la Evolución Humana, Burgos
	Mauer 1 (Heidelberg Man)	0.50	Homo heidelbergensis	1907	Germany	Daniel Hartmann	Institute of Earth Sciences, Heidelberg University
	Saldanha man	0.50	Homo rhodesiensis	1953	South Africa		
	Boxgrove Man	0.50	Homo heidelbergensis	1994	UK		Natural History Museum, London (UK)
Arago XXI	Arago 21 (Tautavel Man)	0.45	Homo erectus	1971	France	Henry de Lumley	
	Ceprano Man	0.450±0.050	Homo cepranensis /Homo heidelbergensis	1994	Ceprano, Italy	Italo Biddittu	Servizio di antropologia, Soprintendenza ai beni culturali, Regione Lazio, Italy
	Agamenón	0.43	Homo neanderthalensis	1997	Spain	Paleontological teams	Museo de la Evolución Humana, Burgos (Spain)
	Miguelón	0.40	Homo neanderthalensis	1992	Spain	Bermúdez, Arsuaga & Carbonell	Museo de la Evolución Humana, Burgos (Spain)
	Aroeira 3	0.40	Homo heidelbergensis	2014	Portugal	João Zilhão	Museu Nacional de Arqueologia, Lisbon
	Salé cranium	0.40-0.20	Homo sapiens?	1971	Morocco	Quarry worker	
Replica	Swanscombe Man	0.40	Homo neanderthalensis	1935, 1936, 1955	UK	Alvan T Marston, John J Wymer and Adrian Gibson	Natural History Museum, London
Replica made by a 3D printer	Ndutu	0.45±.04	Homo neanderthalensis affinities	1973	Tanzania	Amini Aza Mturi	
	Hexian Man	0.412±0.025	Homo erectus	1980-1981	Hexian, China		
	BH-1	0.40	Homo heidelbergensis		Mala Balanica, Serbia		
	Gawis cranium	0.350±0.150	Homo erectus/Homo sapiens	2006	Ethiopia	Asahmed Humet	
	Steinheim Skull	0.35	Homo heidelbergensis	1933	Germany		
	Dinaledi Chamber hominins	0.325±0.090	Homo naledi	2013	South Africa	Rick Hunter and Steven Tucker	University of the Witwatersrand (South Africa)

=== Middle Paleolithic: 300,000–50,000 years old ===
	Name	Age (ka)	Species	Year discovered	Country	Discovered by	Now located at
	Dragon Man	309–138	Homo longi (Denisovan)	1933	China		Hebei GEO University, China
	Broken Hill 1 (Kabwe 1, Rhodesian Man)	299±25	Homo rhodesiensis (Homo heidelbergensis)	1921	Zambia	Tom Zwiglaar	Natural History Museum, London (UK)
Jebel Irhoud 1	Jebel Irhoud 1–5	315±32	Homo sapiens	2017	Morocco	INSAP	
	Samu	275±25	Homo heidelbergensis	1964	Hungary	László Vértes	
	Dali Man	260±20	Homo daliensis	1978	China	Shuntang Liu	
	Jinniushan	260-200 ka	Homo longi Homo daliensis	1984	China	Paleolithic Archeology Student Excavation Team	
	Florisbad Skull	259±35	early Homo sapiens or Homo heidelbergensis or Homo helmei	1932	South Africa	T. F. Dreyer, G. Venter	
	Galilee Man	250±50	Homo heidelbergensis	1925	Israel	Francis Turville-Petre	
	Coupe-Gorge	250	Homo heidelbergensis	1949	France	Raoul Cammas	
	Montmaurin-La Niche mandible	250	Homo heidelbergensis	1949	France	Raoul Cammas	Musée de l'Homme
	Saccopastore 1	250	Homo neanderthalensis	1929	Grotta Guattari / Italy	Mario Grazioli	
	Saccopastore 2	250	Homo neanderthalensis	1935	Grotta Guattari / Italy	Henry Breuil and Alberto Carlo Blanc	
	Narmada Human	236-46	Homo erectus or Homo sapiens	1982	Narmada River, India	Arun Sonakia	
	Bontnewydd Palaeolithic site, Denbighshire, Wales	230	Homo neanderthalensis	1981	Wales, UK		
	Apidima 1 (LAO 1/S1)	210	Homo sapiens	1978	Apidima Cave / Greece	Theodore Pitsios	
Petralona 1	Petralona 1	200±40	Homo heidelbergensis (uncertain)	1960	Greece		Archaeological Museum of Thessaloniki
	Omo remains	233±22 or 195±5	Homo sapiens	1967	Ethiopia	Richard Leakey	
	Laterite Baby	190(?)	H. erectus or H. sapiens	2001	Tamil Nadu, India	P Rajendran	
	Misliya-1	187±13	Homo sapiens	2002	Israel	Israel Hershkovitz	
	Apidima 2 (LAO 1/S2)	170	Homo neanderthalensis	1978	Apidima Cave / Greece	Theodore Pitsios	
	Penghu 1	160±30 or 40±30	Denisovan?	c. 2008	Taiwan		National Museum of Natural Science
Herto's skull	Herto remains	160	Homo sapiens	1997	Ethiopia	Tim White	
Lateral view	Xiahe mandible	160	Denisovan	1980	China		
	Altamura Man	151±21	Homo neanderthalensis	1993	Italy		in situ
	Nesher Ramla Homo	140±120	Nesher Ramla Homo or Homo neanderthalensis	2021	Israel	Israel Hershkovitz	
	Maba Man	140±120	early modern human, Homo neanderthalensis or Denisovan	1958	Shaogun, China		Institute of Vertebrate Paleontology and Paleoanthropology
	Callao Man (CCH9)	134±14	Homo luzonensis	2011–2015	Callao Cave, Philippines	Florent Détroit & Armand Mijares	
	EH 06	132–88	Homo sapiens ?	2002–2006	Lake Eyasi, Tanzania	Manuel Domínguez-Rodrigo	
	LH 18	120±30	Homo sapiens	1976	Ngaloba beds at Laetoli, Tanzania	Mary Leakey	
Tabun C1. Low resolution	Tabun C1	120	Homo neanderthalensis	1967	Israel	Arthur Jelinek	
	Fuyan Teeth	120-80	Homo sapiens	2011	China		
	Zhiren 1-3	116-106	Homo sapiens	2010	China		
	Sarstedt (Sst) I-III	115-58	Homo neanderthalensis?	1997-1999	Germany	Frangenberg brothers	
	Krapina 3	113.5±13.5	Homo neanderthalensis	1899	Croatia	Dragutin Gorjanović-Kramberger	
	Ngandong 7	112	Homo erectus	1931	Indonesia	C. ter Haar and G. H. R. von Koenigswald	
	Denisova 8	110	Denisovan	2010	Russia		
	Qafzeh 6	95±5	Homo sapiens	1930	Israel	R. Neuville, M. Stekelis	
	Qafzeh 9	100–90	Homo sapiens	1933	Israel	B. Vandermeersch	
	Scladina	103±23	Homo neanderthalensis	1993	Belgium		
	Skhul 5	100±20	Homo sapiens	1933	Israel	T. McCown and H. Moivus Jr.	
	Skhul 9	100±20	Homo sapiens		Israel		
	Klasies River Caves	100±25	Homo sapiens	1960	South Africa	Ray Inskeep, Robin Singer, John Wymer, Hilary Deacon	
	Eve's footprints	117	Homo sapiens	1995	South Africa	David Roberts & Lee R. Berger	
	Denny	90	Hybrid – (Homo neanderthalensis/Denisovan)	2012	Denisova Cave / Siberia / Russia	Viviane Slon & Svante Pääbo	Max Planck Institute for Evolutionary Anthropology (Leipzig, Germany)
	Panga ya Saidi	78.3±4.1	Homo sapiens	2021	Kenya		
	Obi-Rakhmat 1	75	Homo neanderthalensis	2003	Uzbekistan		
	Teshik-Tash Skull	70	Homo neanderthalensis	1938	Uzbekistan	A. Okladnikov	
	La Ferrassie 1	70	Homo neanderthalensis	1909	France	R. Capitan and D. Peyrony	
	Shanidar 1	70±10	Homo neanderthalensis	1961	Iraq	Ralph Solecki	
	Sambungmacan (Sm) 1-4	70- 40	Homo erectus	1973-2001	Indonesia	Construction and fossil collectors	
	Callao Man (CCH1)	66.7±1	Homo luzonensis	2007	Callao Cave, Philippines	Florent Détroit & Armand Mijares	
	La Quina 5	65	Homo neanderthalensis		France		
	La Chapelle-aux-Saints 1	60	Homo neanderthalensis	1908	France	A. and J. Bouyssonie and L. Bardon	
	Kebara 2 (Moshe)	60	Homo neanderthalensis	1983	Israel	Lynne Schepartz	
	Amud 7	55±5	Homo neanderthalensis		Israel		
LB 1 skeleton	LB 1 (Hobbit)	55±5	Homo floresiensis	2003	Liang Bua, Indonesia	Peter Brown	
	Manot 1	55	Homo sapiens	2008	Israel		
	La Quina 18	52.5±7.5	Homo neanderthalensis		France		
TPL2 mandible	Tam Pa Ling Cave	54.5±8.5	Homo sapiens	2009	Laos		

=== Upper Paleolithic: 50,000–11,500 years old ===
	Name	Age (ka)	Species	Date discovered	Country	Discovered by	Now located at
	Mungo Man	50±10	Homo sapiens	1974	Australia		
Mt. Circeo 1	Mt. Circeo 1	50±10	Homo neanderthalensis	1939	Italy	Prof. Blanc	
	SID-00B	49.2±2.5	Homo neanderthalensis	1994	Sidrón Cave, Spain		Museo Nacional de Ciencias Naturales, Madrid. Not on display
	Simanya Neanderthals	49-42	Homo neanderthalensis	1978-1979, 2022	Simanya Cave, Spain	Miguel Aznar	Archaeology Museum of Catalonia
	Callao Man (CCH6a–e)	49.6±1.2	Homo luzonensis	2011–2015	Callao Cave, Philippines	Florent Détroit & Armand Mijares	
	Tabon tibia (IV-2000-T-197)	47±11	Homo sapiens	2000	Tabon Caves, Philippines		National Museum of Anthropology
	Ust'-Ishim man	45	Homo sapiens	2008	Russia	Nikolai Peristov	
	Kents Cavern 4 maxilla	43.5±2.5	Homo sapiens	1927	UK		Torquay Museum, Devon, UK
	Zlatý kůň woman	43	Homo sapiens	1950	Czech Republic		
	Tianyuan man	40.5±1.5	Homo sapiens	2007	China		
	Amud 1	41	Homo neanderthalensis	1961	Israel	Hisashi Suzuki	
Neanderthal 1	Neanderthal 1	40	Homo neanderthalensis	1856	Germany	Johann Carl Fuhlrott	
Denisova phalanx distalis	Denisova hominin (X-Woman)	40	Homo sp. Altai (also known as Homo longi)	2008	Russia	Johannes Krause, et al.	
Denisova toe bone	hominin toe bone	40	Homo sp. Altai (possible Neanderthal–Denisovan hybrid)	2010	Russia		
Oase 2	Oase 1	42–37	Homo sapiens (EEMH x Neanderthal hybrid)	2002	Romania		
	Kostenki-14 (Markina Gora)	40–37	Homo sapiens (EEMH)	1954	Russia		
	SID-20	37.30±0.83	Homo neanderthalensis	1994	Sidrón Cave, Spain		
Museo Nacional de Ciencias Naturales, Madrid. Not on display	Balangoda Man	37	Homo sapiens	2012	Sri Lanka		
	Hofmeyr Skull	36	Homo sapiens	1952	South Africa		
Wadjak 1, aka Java Man	Wadjak 1	33±4.5	Homo sapiens (proto-Australoid)	1888	Indonesia		
	Red Lady of Paviland	33	Homo sapiens	1823	Wales, UK	William Buckland	
	Liujiang man	33-23	Homo sapiens	1958	China		
	Yamashita-Cho Man	32	Homo sapiens	1962	Japan		
Engis 2	Engis 2	40±10	Homo neanderthalensis	1829	Belgium	Philippe-Charles Schmerling	
Gibraltar 1	Gibraltar 1	40±10	Homo neanderthalensis	1848	Gibraltar	Captain Edmund Flint	Natural History Museum, London
Le Moustier 1	Le Moustier	40±10	Homo neanderthalensis	1909	France		
Denisova molar	Denisovan tooth	40±10	Homo sp. Altai	2000	Russia		
	PES-2	38.9–92	Uncertain, possibly Homo neanderthalensis		Serbia		
	PES-1	31–29	Uncertain, possibly Homo sapiens		Serbia		
	Yana RHS	31.63	Homo sapiens		Russia		
	Sungir I	30.25±0.25	Homo sapiens		Russia		
Cro-Magnon 1	Cro-Magnon 1	30	Homo sapiens (EEMH)	1868	France	Louis Lartet	
	WLH-50	29±5	Homo sapiens	1982	Australia		
	Pangpond	29	Homo sapiens	2025	Khao Sam Roi Yot, Thailand		
Replica of Predmosti 3	Predmost 3	26	Homo sapiens	1894	Czech Republic	Karel Jaroslav Maška	
	Lapedo Child	24.5	Homo neanderthalensis or Homo sapiens	1998	Portugal	João Zilhão	
	Mid-Upper Paleolithoic human humerus from Eel Point, Caldey Island, Wales, UK	24	Homo sapiens	1997	Wales, UK		
	MA-1 (Mal'ta boy)	24	Homo sapiens (ANE)	1920s	Russia		
	Abri Pataud Woman	20.6	Homo sapiens		France		
Minatogawa 1. Replica at the Museum of Tokyo	Minatogawa 1	17±1	Homo sapiens	1970	Japan		Anthropology Museum, Tokyo University
	Tandou	17	Homo sapiens	1967	Australia	Duncan Merrilees	
	Tabon skull cap (P-XIII-T-288)	16.5±2	Homo sapiens	1962	Tabon Caves, Philippines	Robert B. Fox	National Museum of Anthropology
	Gough's Cave	14.7	Homo sapiens	2010	UK		
Iwo Eleru skull. Four views	Iwo Eleru skull	13	Homo sapiens	1965	Nigeria		
	"Kotias"	13	Homo sapiens (CHG)		Kotias Klde cave, Georgia		
	Arlington Springs Man	13	Homo sapiens	1959	United States	Phil Orr	
	Chancelade find	14.5±2.5	Homo sapiens	1888	France		
	Villabruna 1	14	Homo sapiens (WHG)	1988	Italy		University of Ferrara, not on display
	Bonn-Oberkassel double burial	14-13	Homo sapiens	1914	Germany		
	Bichon man	13.7	Homo sapiens (WHG)	1956	Switzerland		
Red Deer cave skull	Red Deer Cave	13±1.5	Homo sapiens	1979	China	Darren Curnoe?	

== Holocene (11,500–5,000 years old) ==
	Name	Age (ka)	Culture / association	Year discovered	Country	Discovered by	Now located at
	Luzia	11.5	Paleo-Indian	1975	Brazil		
	Cerro Sota 2	11		1936	Chile		
	"Satsurblia"	10	Caucasian Epipaleolithic (CHG)		Georgia		
	Yaho skull	10?		1961	Chad		
	Kow Swamp 1	13–9		1968	Australia		
Talgai Skull	Talgai Skull	10±1		1886	Australia		
	La Brea Woman	10 (8000 BC)	Paleo-Indian	1914	United States		
	Combe Capelle	9.6 (7600 BC)	European Mesolithic	1909	France		
	Asselar man	Between 9500 BP and 7000 BP, with caution, 6390 BP	Neolithic	1927	Mali		
	Cheddar Man	9 (7000 BC)	British Mesolithic	1903	United Kingdom		Natural History Museum, London
	Kennewick Man	9 (7000 BC)	Archaic period (North America)	1996	United States		
	Barum Woman	8.8 (6800 BC)	European Mesolithic	1939	Sweden		
	Tepexpan man	8±3	Paleo-Indian	1947	Mexico		
	Loschbour man	8 (6000 BC)	European Mesolithic (WHG)	1935	Luxembourg		National Museum of Natural History, Luxembourg City.
	Minnesota Woman	7.9±0.1 (5900 BC)	Paleo-Indian	1931	Minnesota, United States		
	Tumba Madžari	7.9 (5976–5760 BC)		1985	North Macedonia	Skopje, Archaeological Museum of the Republic of North Macedonia	
	Lothagam 4b (Lo 4b)	7.5±1.5		1965–1975	Kenya		
	Besséʼ	7.3–7.2	Toalean	2015	Sulawesi, Indonesia		
	Ötzi	5.3 (3230 BC)	European Neolithic	1991	Ötztal Alps, Italy		South Tyrol Museum of Archaeology, Bolzano, Italy
	Tarim mummies	4.1 (2135 BC)	Afanasievo culture	1970's	Tarim Basin, China		

== Abbreviations used in fossil catalog name ==
- AL – Afar Locality, Ethiopia
- ARA-VP – Aramis Vertebrate Paleontology, Ethiopia
- BAR – (Lukeino, Tugen Hills) Baringo District, Kenya
- BOU-VP – Bouri Vertebrate Paleontology, Ethiopia
- D – Dmanisi, Georgia
- ER – East (Lake) Rudolf, Kenya
- KGA – Konso-Gardula, Ethiopia
- KNM – Kenya National Museum
- KP – Kanapoi, Kenya
- LB – Liang Bua, Indonesia
- LH – Laetoli Hominid 4, Tanzania
- MH – Malapa Hominin, South Africa
- NG – Ngandong, Indonesia
- OH – Olduvai Hominid, Tanzania
- SK – Swartkrans, South Africa
- Sts, Stw – Sterkfontein, South Africa
- TM – Transvaal Museum, South Africa
- TM – Toros-Menalla, Chad
- WT – West (Lake) Turkana, Kenya

== See also ==
- Human timeline
- List of first human settlements
- List of fossil primates
- List of fossil sites
- List of mummies
- List of transitional fossils
- Timeline of human evolution
- Timeline of prehistory
