= Tianyuan =

Tianyuan may refer to:

- Tianyuan (Go) (天元), centre of a Go board or a Go competition in China
- Tianyuan District (天元区), Zhuzhou, Hunan
- Tianyuan, Cixi (天元镇), town in Cixi City, Zhejiang
- Tianyuan Cave (田园洞), cave near Beijing where the Tianyuan man was found
  - Tianyuan man (田园洞人), one of the earliest modern humans to inhabit eastern Asia
- Tian yuan shu (天元術), a Chinese system of algebra for polynomial equations created in the 13th century

== Historical eras ==
- Tianyuan (天元, 1379–1388), era name used by Uskhal Khan Tögüs Temür, emperor of Northern Yuan
- Tianyuan (添元, 1453–1457), era name used by Esen Taishi, ruler of Northern Yuan

== See also ==
- Tian Yuan (disambiguation)
