= KNM-ER 1805 =

Hominin fossil

Coordinates: 3°55′35″N 36°11′57″E

KNM ER 1805
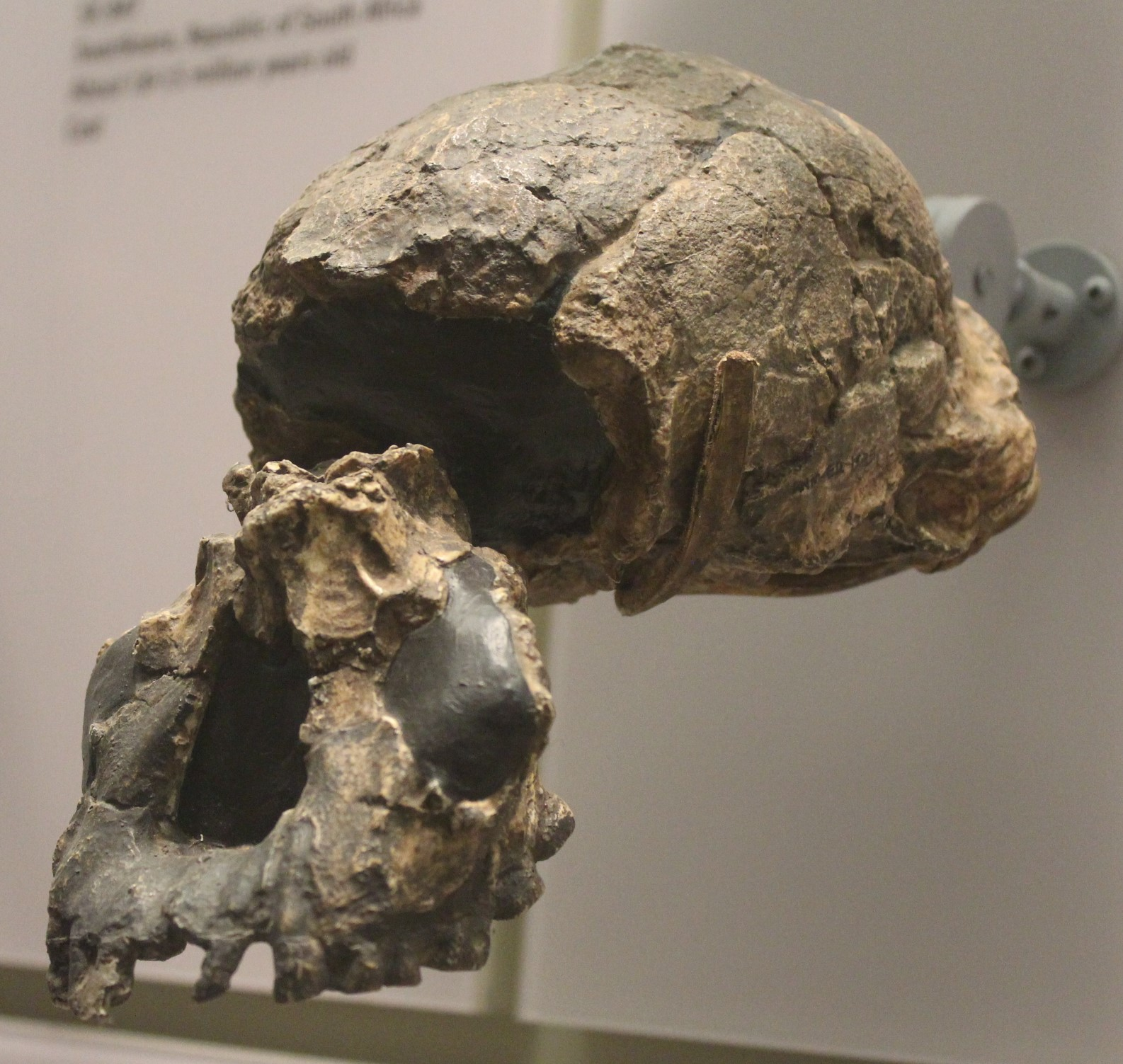
- Replica of KNM-ER 1805 in Washington, D.C.
- Catalog no.: KNM ER 1805
- Species: Homo habilis
- Age: 1.74 million years
- Place discovered: Kenya
- Date discovered: 1974

KNM ER 1805 is the catalog number given to several pieces of a fossilized skull of the species Homo habilis. It was discovered in Koobi Fora, Kenya in 1974. The designation indicates specimen 1805, collected from the east shore of Lake Rudolf (now Lake Turkana) for the Kenya National Museums.

It is estimated to be 1.74 million years old.

Due to its incompleteness, it has been the subject of debate as to its classification. It was originally classified as Homo erectus but due to the projection of the face and the shape of the cranium, it is now generally classified as H. habilis.

The brain capacity is about 582 cm³.

== See also ==
- List of fossil sites (with link directory)
- List of hominina (hominid) fossils (with images)
