= AL 200-1 =

Extinct primate fossil

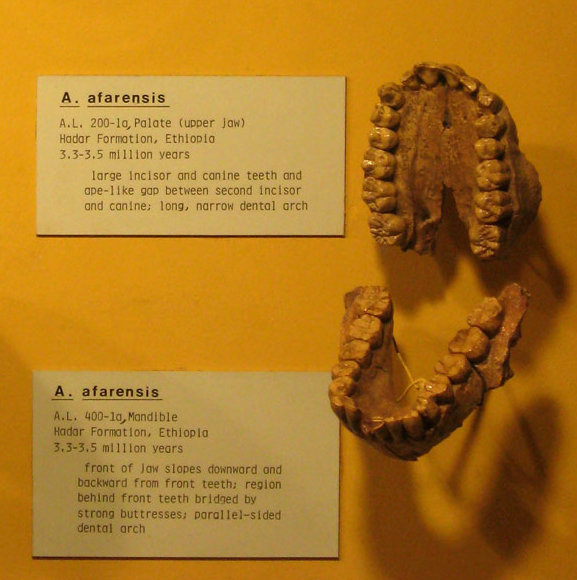
- AL 200-1a (top) and AL 400-1a (bottom)
- Catalog no.: AL 200-1
- Species: Australopithecus afarensis
- Age: 3.1 million years
- Place discovered: Hadar, Ethiopia
- Date discovered: 17 October 1974
- Discovered by: Ato Asfaw

AL 200-1 (Afar Locality) is the fossilized upper palate and teeth of the species Australopithecus afarensis, estimated to be 3.2-3 million years old. Its characteristics are an ape-like arrangement of teeth including spatulate incisors and a gap between the canines and outside incisors.

It was discovered in the Afar Depression in Ethiopia by Ato Alemayehu Asfaw on 17 October 1974. Donald Johanson and Maurice Taieb announced the discovery and published the initial description of the fossil in 1976 (the first detailed description was published by Johanson and Yves Coppens the same year).

== See also ==
- List of fossil sites
- List of human evolution fossils
