= Tian Yuan =

Tian Yuan may refer to:

- Tian Yuan (table tennis) (born 1975), Croatian table tennis player
- Tian Yuan (singer) (born 1985), Chinese singer-songwriter, actress, novelist and photographer
- Tian Yuan (weightlifter) (born 1993), Chinese weightlifter

== See also ==
- Tianyuan (disambiguation)
