= STS 71 =

Fossilized skull of Australopithecus africanus found in South Africa

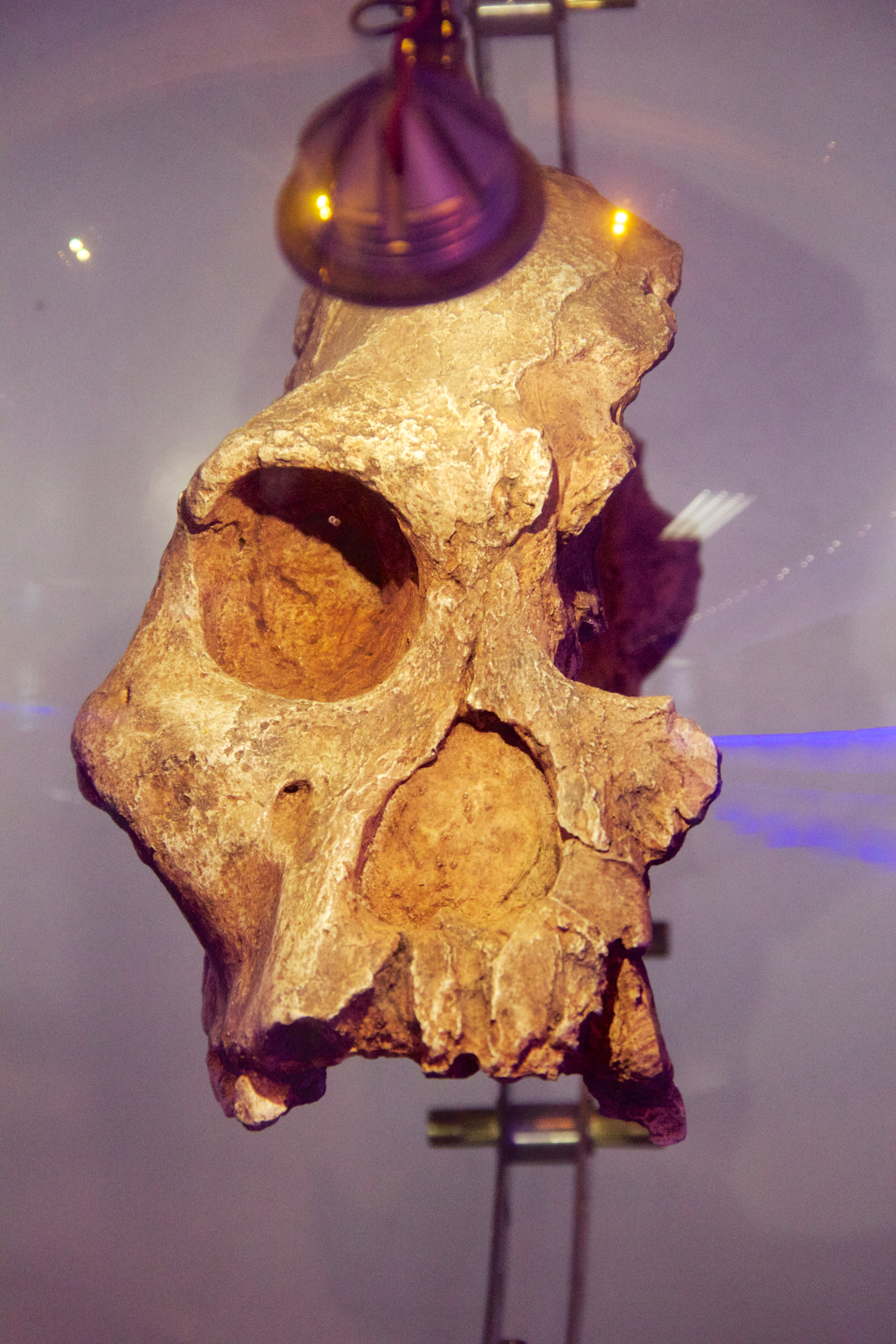
- Catalog no.: STS 71
- Species: Australopithecus africanus
- Age: 2.5 mya
- Place discovered: Sterkfontein, South Africa
- Date discovered: 1947
- Discovered by: Robert Broom

STS 71 is a fossilized skull of the species Australopithecus africanus. It was discovered in Sterkfontein, South Africa by Robert Broom in 1947. In 1972 John Wallace connected STS 71 with STS 36, a lower jaw found in the same layer, by matching the wear patterns on the teeth.

It is estimated to be 2.5 million years old.

Its characteristics include a smaller cranium and facial features than other female Australopithecines finds yet the size of the teeth indicate this specimen to be male. The face shows forward projection and the position of the temporal lines high on the cranium indicate large chewing muscles. The brain is 428cc.

== See also ==
- List of human fossils
- List of fossil sites (with link directory)
- List of hominina (hominid) fossils (with images)
