= Rizal Archaeological Site =

Archaeological site in Kalinga, Philippines

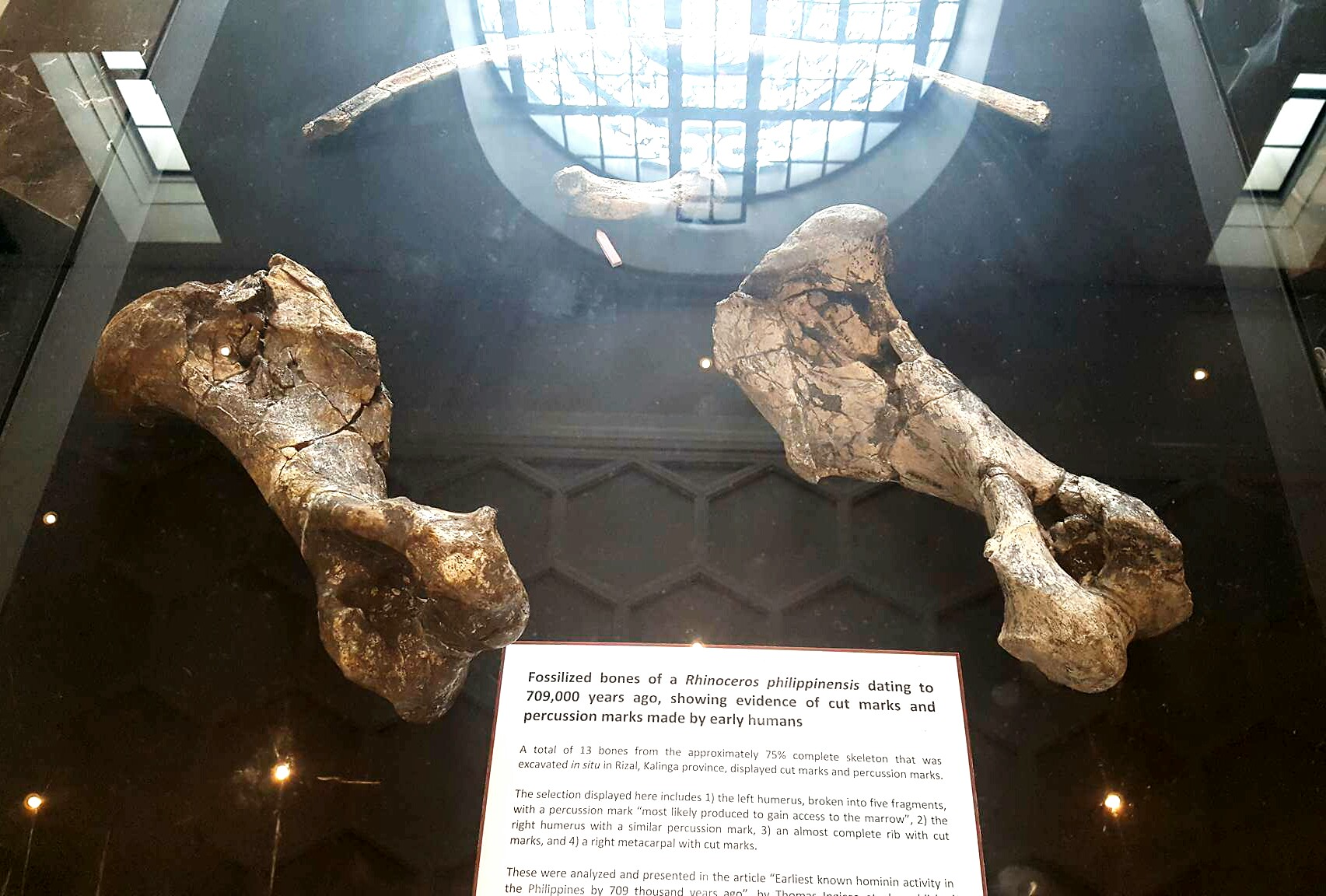

- Location in Luzon Location in the Philippines
- 17°30′N 121°36′E
- Location: Rizal, Kalinga, Philippines
- Region: Cordillera

The Rizal Archaeological Site is an archaeological area situated in Rizal, Kalinga, Philippines.

The first fossils were discovered on the archaeological site in 1935. On 1977, President Ferdinand Marcos Sr. declared the site as an archaeological reserve.

== Archaeological findings ==
The site is located in the municipality of Rizal in Kalinga province, Luzon island. In 2018, a French-Filipino team of archeologists led by Thomas Ingicco discovered 57 stone tools directly associated with the fossil of a butchered rhinoceros, the extinct Nesorhinus philippinensis. The discovery pushed the first known hominin activity in the Philippines back to c. 709000±68000 years ago (709±68 ka), during the Chibanian or Middle Pleistocene age. Prior to the excavation, the oldest fossil discovered in the country was a foot bone found in 2010 in Callao Cave, Cagayan Valley. The bone was dated at least 67,000 years old.

The recovered artifacts consisted of flake tools, lithic cores, and hammerstones. Flakes were sourced from dacite (a volcanic rock) as well as various siliceous rocks like chert, flint, jasper, and quartzite. The rhinoceros skeleton was found from a clay-rich bone bed; it was discovered as 75% complete, although the bones were separated at the joints. Cut marks on 13 of the bones indicated that hominins used stone tools to remove the carcass's flesh. They likely intended to smash the bones for marrow extraction as well, as shown by percussion marks on both humeri.

To date the fossil and its associated tools, electron spin resonance methods were performed on tooth enamel and quartz rock samples. Argon–argon dating was applied on plagioclase grains.

== Bibliography ==
- Dizon, Eusebio (2022). "The Prehistory of the Philippines". In Higham, Charles; Kim, Nam C. (eds.). The Oxford Handbook of Early Southeast Asia. Oxford University Press. pp. 819–838. ISBN 978-019-935-5372.
- Ellis-Petersen, Hannah (May 4, 2018). "Butchered rhino suggests humans were in the Philippines 700,000 years ago". The Guardian. ISSN 0261-3077. Archived from the original on May 13, 2018.
- Ingicco, T.; van den Bergh, G. D.; Jago-on, C.; Bahain, J.-J.; Chacón, M. G.; Amano, N.; Forestier, H.; King, C.; Manalo, K.; Nomade, S.; Pereira, A.; Reyes, M. C.; Sémah, A.-M.; Shao, Q.; Voinchet, P. (2018). "Earliest known hominin activity in the Philippines by 709 thousand years ago". Nature. 557 (7704): 233–237. Bibcode:2018Natur.557..233I. doi:10.1038/s41586-018-0072-8. ISSN 1476-4687. PMID 29720661.
- Ingicco, T.; Reyes, M. C.; de Vos, J.; Belarmino, M.; Albers, P. C. H.; Lipardo, I.; Gallet, X.; Amano, N.; van den Bergh, G. D.; Cosalan, A. D.; Bautista, A. (2020). "Taphonomy and chronosequence of the 709 ka Kalinga site formation (Luzon Island, Philippines)". Scientific Reports. 10 (1): 11081. Bibcode:2020NatSR..1011081I. doi:10.1038/s41598-020-68066-3. ISSN 2045-2322. PMC 7338544. PMID 32632190.
- Ingicco, Thomas; Sémah, François; Zhou, Yuduan; Sémah, Anne-Marie; Forestier, Hubert (2022). "The early lithic productions of Island Southeast Asia: Traditions or convergences?". L'Anthropologie. 126 (1) 102997. doi:10.1016/j.anthro.2022.102997. ISSN 0003-5521.
- Lambard, Jean-Baptiste; Pereira, Alison; Voinchet, Pierre; Guillou, Hervé; Reyes, Marian C.; Nomade, Sébastien; Gallet, Xavier; Belarmino, Maricar; Bahain, Jean-Jacques; De Vos, John; Falguères, Christophe; Cosalan, Andrea; Ingicco, Thomas (2024). "Geochronological advances in human and proboscideans first arrival date in the Philippines archipelago (Cagayan valley, Luzon Island)". Quaternary Geochronology. 84 101597. Bibcode:2024QuGeo..8401597L. doi:10.1016/j.quageo.2024.101597. ISSN 1871-1014.
- Morley, Mike W.; Goldberg, Paul (2017). "Geoarchaeological research in the humid tropics: A global perspective". Journal of Archaeological Science. Geoarchaeology in the Humid Tropics: Practice, Problems, Prospects. 77: 1–9. Bibcode:2017JArSc..77....1M. doi:10.1016/j.jas.2016.11.002.
- Pawlik, Alfred F.; Fuentes, Riczar B. (2023-05-09). "Prehistoric Hunter-Gatherers in the Philippines—Subsistence strategies, adaptation, and behaviour in maritime environments". Frontiers in Earth Science. 11 1110147. Bibcode:2023FrEaS..1110147P. doi:10.3389/feart.2023.1110147. ISSN 2296-6463.
- Strickland, Ashley (May 4, 2018). "Humans were in Philippines 700,000 years ago". CNN. Archived from the original on May 13, 2018.
- Zhuang, Yijie; Lane, Paul J. (2021). "Harvesting the winds, harvesting the rain: an introduction to the issue on Inhabiting tropical worlds". World Archaeology. 53 (4): 563–578. doi:10.1177/0959683620941152. hdl:21.11116/0000-0006-CB04-1.
