= Armand Mijares =

Filipino archaeologist (born 1966)

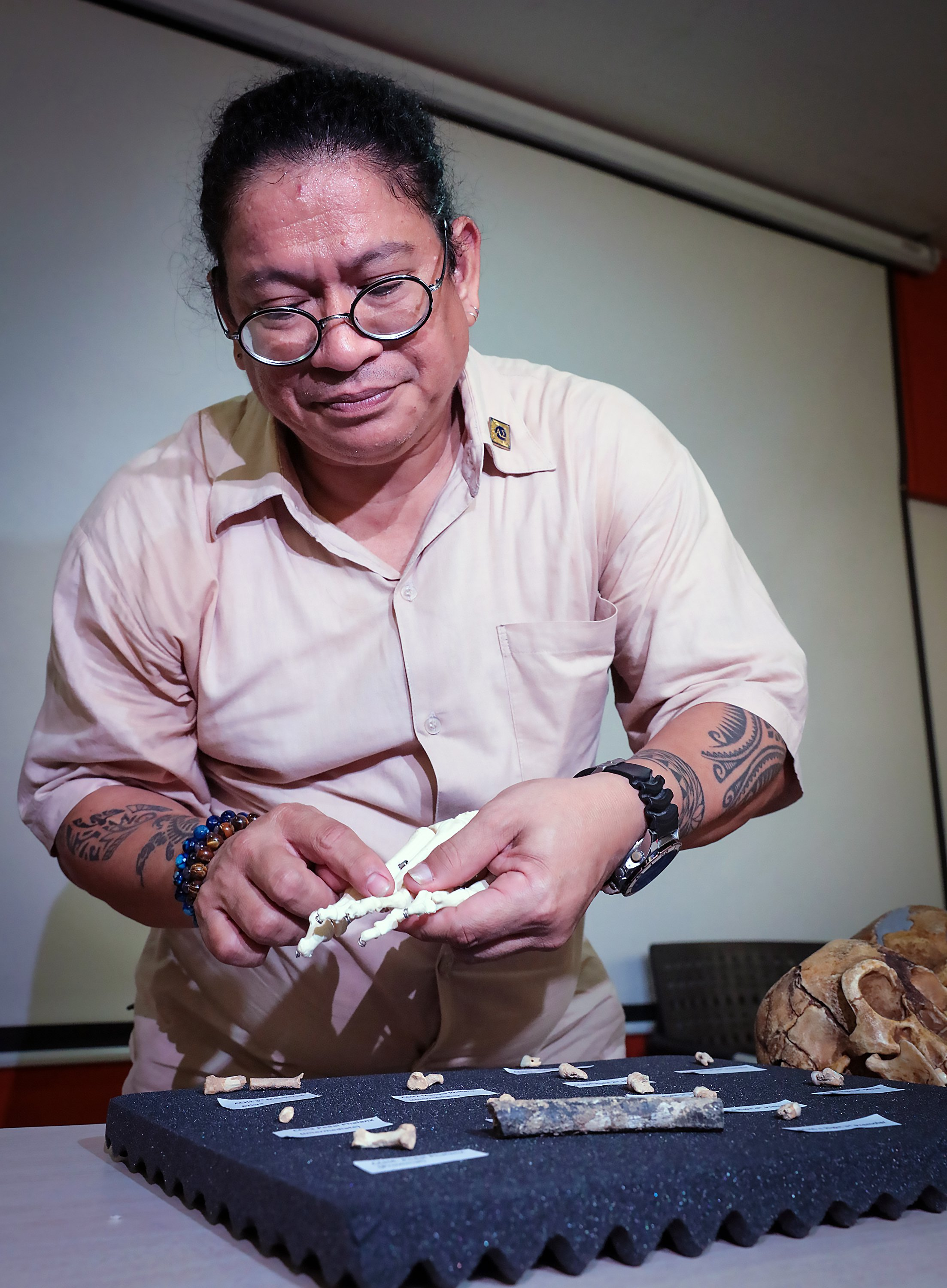
- Salvador Mijares presenting the newly-discovered species, Homo luzonensis
- Born: August 3, 1966 (age 60)
- Education: University of the Philippines Manila (BA); University of the Philippines Diliman (PGDip, MA); University of New Mexico (MA); Australian National University (PhD)
- Known for: The discovery of Homo luzonensis
- Scientific career
- Fields: Archaeology
- Workplaces: University of Philippines Diliman; National Museum of the Philippines
- Doctoral advisor: Peter Bellwood

Armand Salvador B. Mijares is a Filipino archaeologist. He works as Professor of Archaeology at the School of Archeology of the University of the Philippines Diliman. He specializes in lithic analysis, ceramic petrology, soil micromorphology, paleolithic archaeology and early human migration in Southeast Asia. In 2010, Mijares gained international attention as the main author of a Journal of Human Evolution report about a 67,000-year old foot bone discovered in Callao Cave. That report gave evidence for the newly named species of Homo, called Homo luzonensis, named after the Philippines' largest island—Luzon. The discovery has advanced the complexity of early human colonization of Southeast Asia.

== Education ==
Mijares earned his Bachelor of Arts in Development Studies from the University of the Philippines Manila and his Master of Arts in anthropology at the University of the Philippines Diliman. He also became a member of the Alpha Sigma fraternity. In 1996, he did his Diploma in Archaeology at UP Diliman's newly established Archaeological Studies Program and went on with a Fulbright Scholarship to pursue his Master of Science in Anthropology major in archaeology at the University of New Mexico in 2001. He finished his PhD in Archaeology and Palaeoanthropology at the Australian National University under the tutelage of Peter Bellwood in 2006

In 2021, Mijares was awarded the University of the Philippines Alumni Association (UPAA) Distinguished Alumni Award in Science and Technology (Archaeology).

== Career ==
After he received his master's degree, he taught at the University of the Philippines Manila. Afterwards he pursued archaeological research work at the National Museum of the Philippines in 1994, and worked as an archaeologist in the museum until 2006. After earning his Ph.D., Mijares returned to University of the Philippines-Diliman where he now does his archeological research as Professor at the Archaeological Studies Program.

He is a member of the editorial board of World Archaeology journal.

== Research ==
Mijares' research primarily focuses on understanding early human migration in Maritime Southeast Asia. He is also interested in reconstructing hunter-gatherer subsistence strategy during the Late Pleistocene and early Holocene period through thorough excavations in Northern Luzon, especially in Callao Cave Complex, where the earliest human remains in the Philippines (67kya), was found. He is also leading an archaeological research in the island of Mindoro which has been in collaboration with other specialists and colleagues, both local and international, in order to reconstruct past human movements. Mijares' area of specialization is on lithic analysis, ceramic petrology, soil micromorphology, early human migration and Palaeolithic archaeology.

Due to his contributions to archaeology in the Indo-Pacific region and globally, he was awarded the Indo-Pacific Impact Award (Global Australian Awards) in 2023.

== Homo luzonensis ==
Mijares and his team found the bones of two adults and a child, from a previously unknown human-related species now called Homo luzonensis and previously known as the Callao Man.

The hominin fossils and teeth are from three individuals and were collectively nicknamed 'Ubag', after a mythical cave man that were excavated in 2007, 2011 and 2015. The Internationally pooled team of specialists and archaeologists consist of paleoanthropologist Florent Détroit of the Muséum national d’Histoire naturelle, zooarchaeologist Philip Piper of Australian National University, and geochronologist Rainer Grün of Griffith University, dug up the hominin fossils from a sedimentary level located three meters below the current surface of the cave floor. Through uranium-series dating, the bones were found to be 50 to 67 thousand years old—making them the earliest human remains to be discovered in the Philippines
