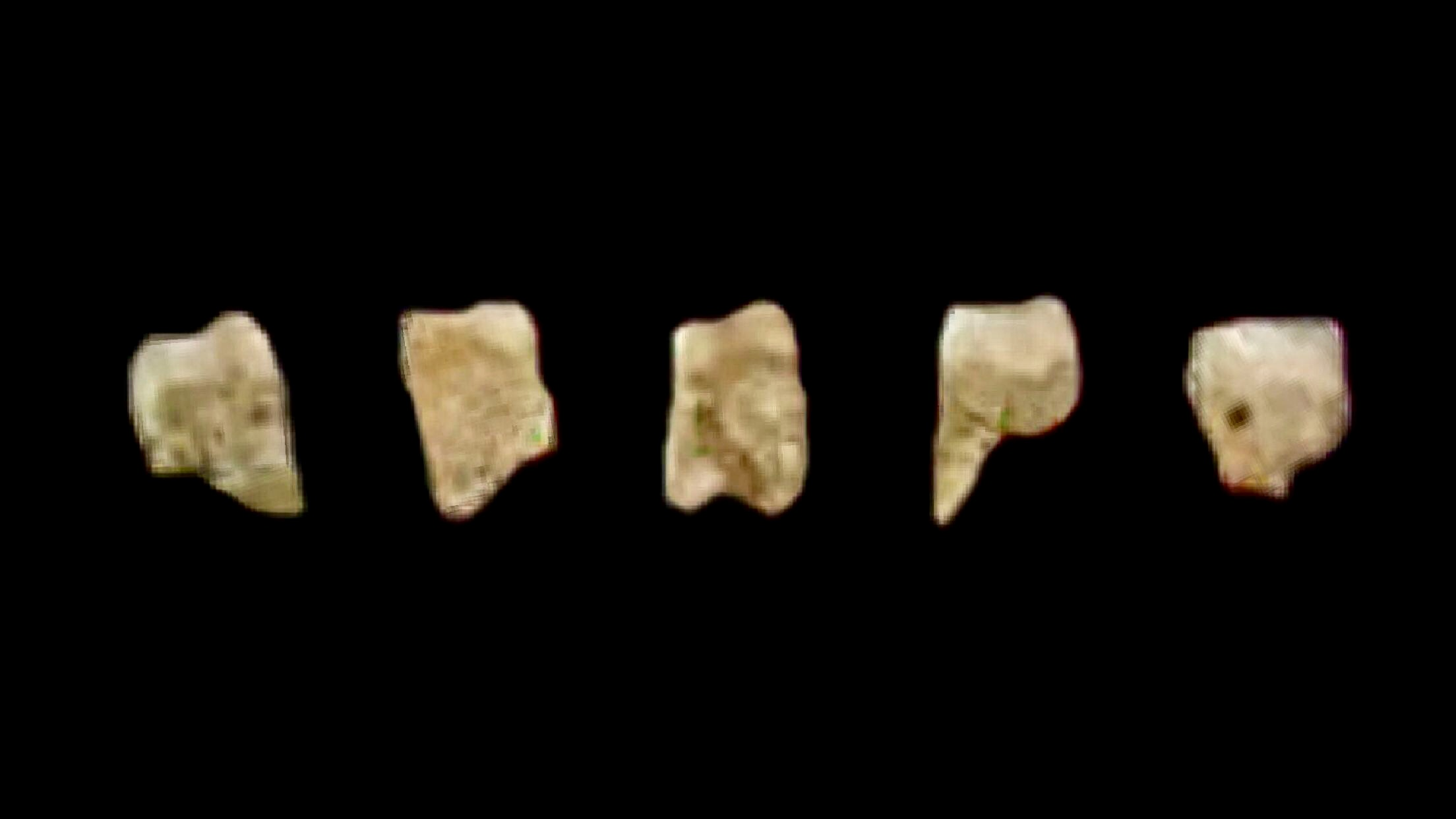
- CCH6a–e, molar and premolar teeth dated around 49,200 years ago
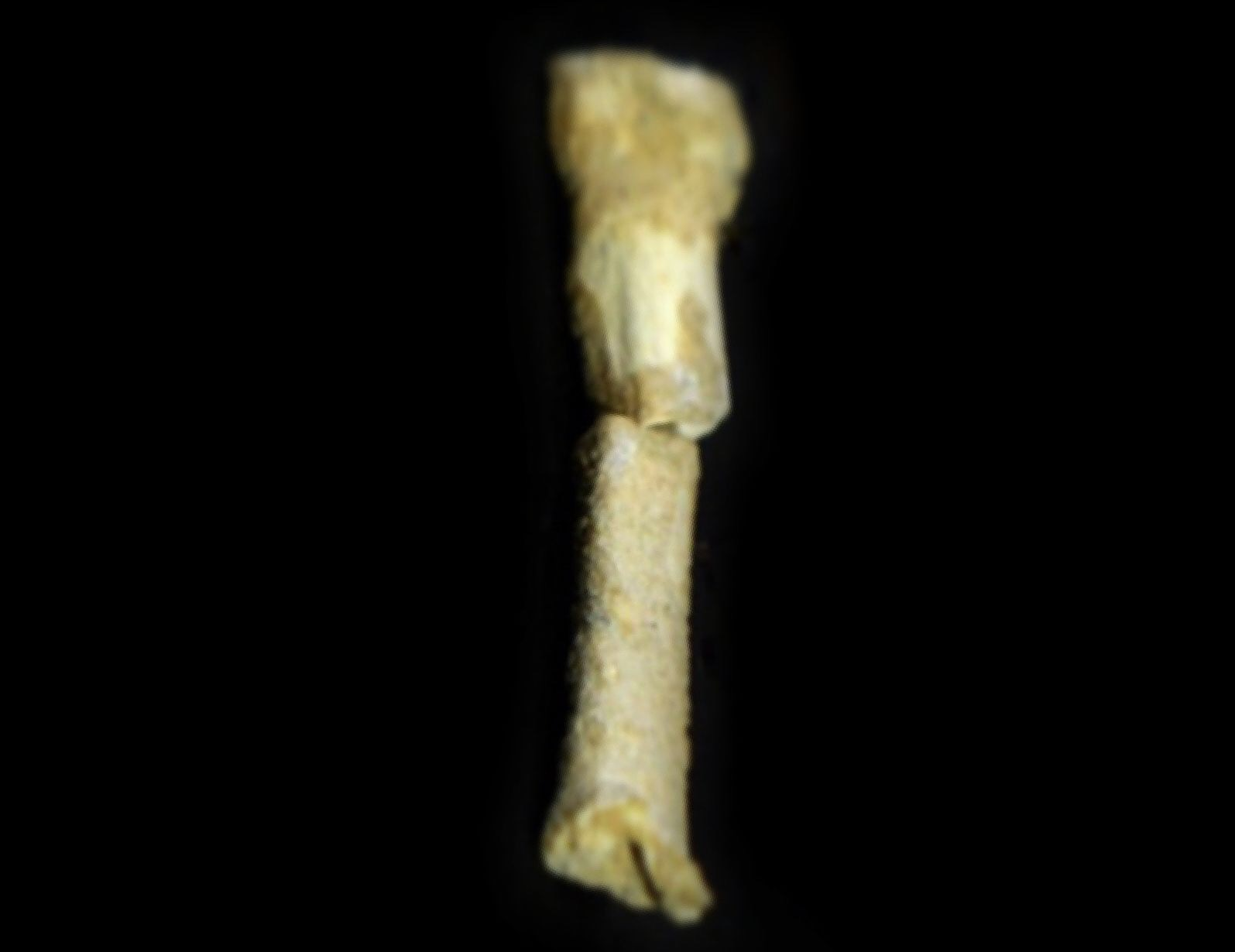
- CCH1, a 67,000 year old third metatarsal bone

Scientific classification
- Kingdom: Animalia
- Phylum: Chordata
- Class: Mammalia
- Order: Primates
- Superfamily: Hominoidea
- Family: Hominidae
- Genus: Homo
- Species: †H. luzonensis

Binomial name
- †Homo luzonensis Détroit et al., 2019

= Homo luzonensis =

Homo luzonensis Temporal range: late Middle Pleistocene to Late Pleistocene, 0.134–0.049 Ma

Archaic human from Luzon, Philippines

Homo luzonensis, also known as Callao Man and locally called "Ubag" after a mythical caveman, is an extinct, possibly pygmy, species of archaic human from the Late Pleistocene of Luzon, the Philippines. Their remains, teeth and phalanges, are known only from Callao Cave in the northern part of the island dating to before 50,000 years ago. They were initially identified as belonging to modern humans in 2010, but in 2019, after the discovery of more specimens, they were placed into a new species based on the presence of a wide range of traits similar to modern humans as well as to Australopithecus and early Homo. In 2023, a study found that the fossilized remains were 134,000 ± 14,000 years old, much older than previously thought.

Their ancestors, who may have been Asian H. erectus or some other even earlier Homo, would have needed to have made a sea crossing of several miles at minimum to reach the island. Hominin presence on Luzon dates to as early as 771,000 to 631,000 years ago. The inhabitants of the cave dragged in mainly Philippine deer carcasses, and used tools for butchering.

== Taxonomy ==
The first bone was discovered in 2007 by zooarchaeologist Philip Piper while sorting through animal bones recovered from the archaeological excavation led by Filipino archaeologist Armand Mijares in Callao Cave, Northern Luzon, Philippines. In 2010, Mijares and French bioanthropologist Florent Détroit, together with a team of international and local Philippine archaeologists, identified them as belonging to modern humans. After the discovery of 12 new specimens and based on the apparent presence of both modern human-like and primitive Australopithecus-like features, they reassigned the remains (and other hominin findings from the cave) to a new species, Homo luzonensis, the specific name deriving from the name of the island.

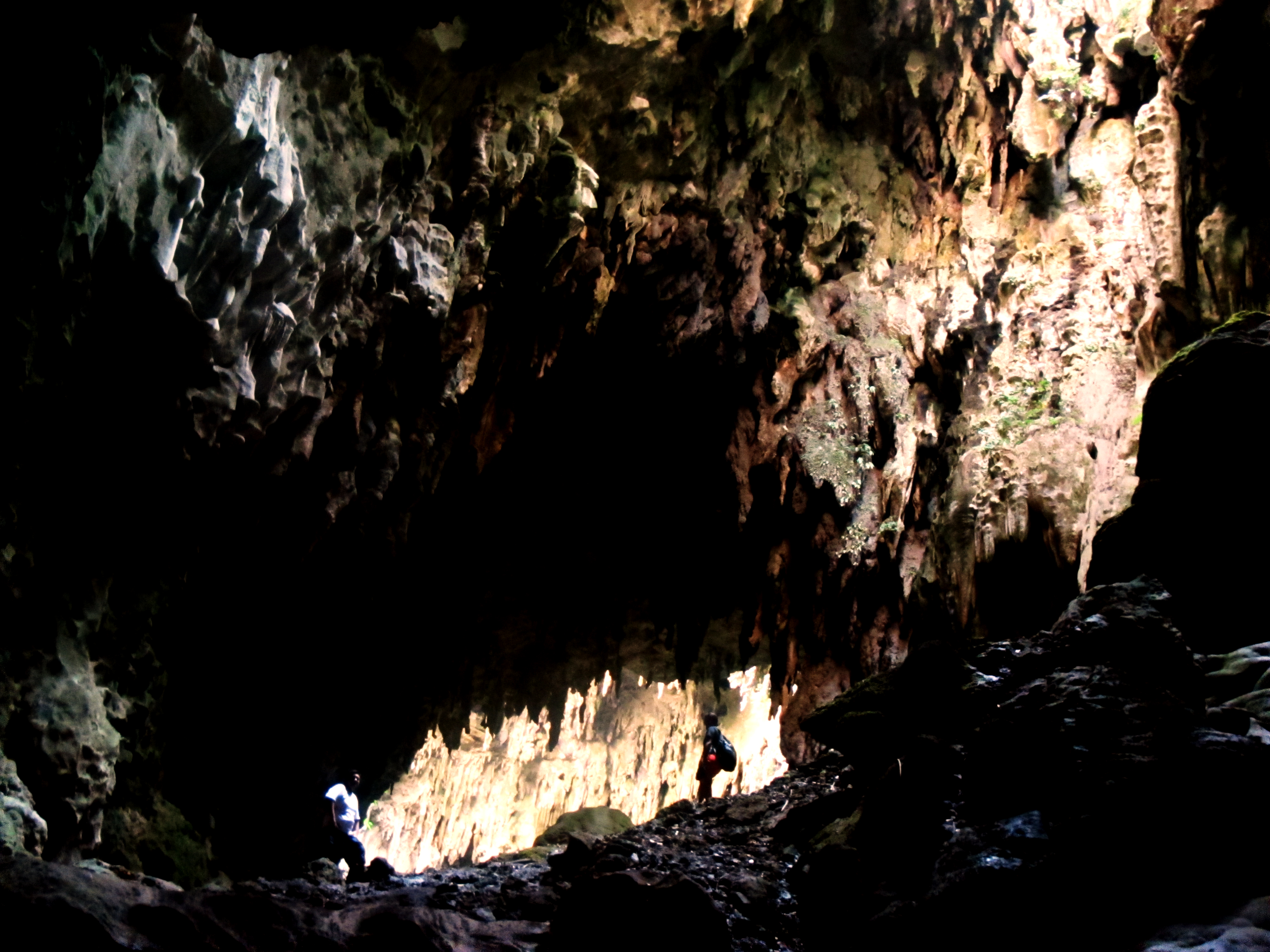
Interior of Callao Cave, Luzon, the Philippines

The holotype, CCH6, comprises the upper right premolars and molars. The paratypes are: CCH1, a right third metatarsal bone of the foot; CCH2 and CCH5, two phalanges of the fingers; CCH3 and CCH4, two phalanges of the foot; CCH4, a left premolar; and CCH9, a right third molar. CCH7 represents a juvenile femoral shaft. These represent at least three individuals. The specimens are kept at the National Museum of the Philippines, Manila.

The exact taxonomic placement of H. luzonensis is unknown, and, like for other tropical hominins, DNA extraction failed. It is possible that—like what is hypothesized for H. floresiensis from Flores, Indonesia—H. luzonensis descended from an early H. erectus dispersal across Southeast Asia. It is also possible that these two insular archaic humans descend from an entirely different Homo species possibly earlier than H. erectus. The bones were dated to before 50,000 years ago, and there is evidence of hominin activity on the island as early as 771,000 – 631,000 years ago.

It is possible that Homo luzonensis is either closely related to or directly a member of the Denisovan taxon, based on the unusually high percentage of Denisovan DNA found in Ayta Magbukon populations (southern Ayta), approximately 30-40% higher than Aboriginal Australians and Papuans. This seems to suggest that Denisovans existed in the Philippines and interbred with the local populations, rather than the interbreeding taking place in East Asia before migrating to the Philippines. Further DNA testing is needed to make a final determination, which is difficult on fossils this old and compounded by the small number of Denisovan DNA samples currently in existence.

== Anatomy ==
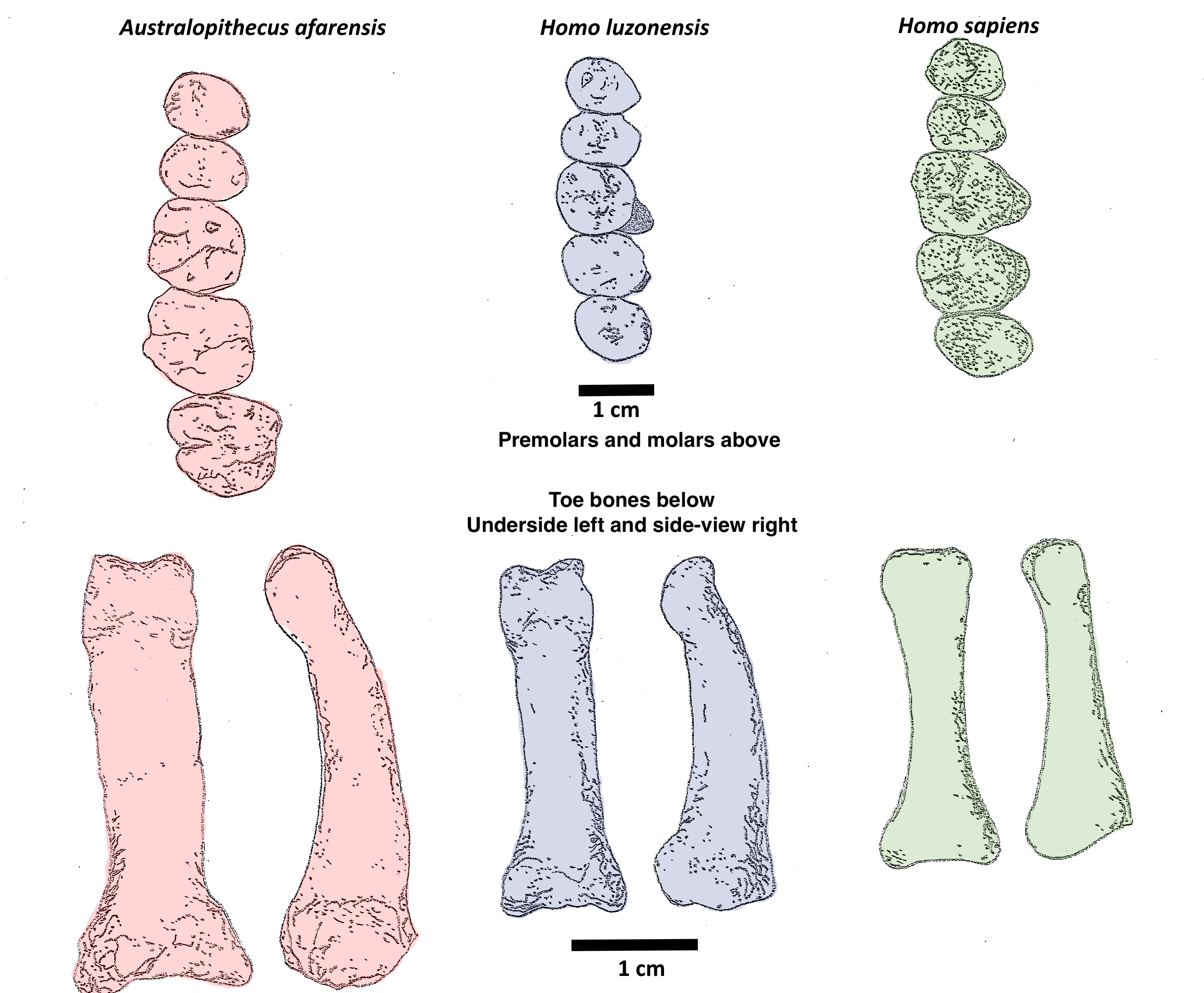
Comparison of teeth (above) and foot phalanges (below) of A. afarensis (left), H. luzonensis (center), and modern humans (right)

Like other endemic fauna on Luzon, as well as H. floresiensis, H. luzonensis may have shrunk in size due to insular dwarfism. However, more complete remains are needed to verify size. Much like H. floresiensis, H. luzonensis presents a number of characteristics more similar to Australopithecus and early Homo than to modern humans and more recent Homo.

The teeth of H. luzonensis are small and mesiodistally (the width of the tooth) shortened. The molars are smaller than those of H. floresiensis. Like other recent Homo and modern humans, the molars decrease in size towards the back of the mouth, and the enamel-dentin juncture lacks well defined wavy crenulations. The enamel-dentine juncture is most similar to that of Asian H. erectus. The premolars are oddly large compared to the molars, with more similar proportions to Paranthropus than any other Homo, though H. luzonensis postcanine teeth differ greatly from those of Paranthropus in size and shape. H. luzonensis premolars share many characteristics with those of Australopithecus, Paranthropus, and early Homo.

The finger bones are long, narrow, and curved, which is seen in Australopithecus, H. floresiensis, and sometimes modern humans. They are dorso-palmarly (from the palm to the back of the hand) compressed, and have well-developed flexor sheath attachment, which are seen in Australopithecus and the early H. habilis. Unique to H. luzonensis, the dorsal beak near the knuckle was strongly developed and angled towards the wrist rather than the finger. The foot bones are morphologically unique among Homo, and are distinguishable from those of A. africanus and A. afarensis. Australopithecus limbs are generally interpreted as being adaptations for bipedalism and potentially suspensory behavior in the trees, but the fragmentary record of H. luzonensis limits extrapolation of locomotory behavior.

Since the remains are so fragmentary, it is difficult to make accurate estimates of actual size for this species, but they may have been within the range of modern day Philippine Negritos, who average 151 cm (4 ft 11 in) in height for males and 142 cm (4 ft 8 in) for females.

== Culture ==
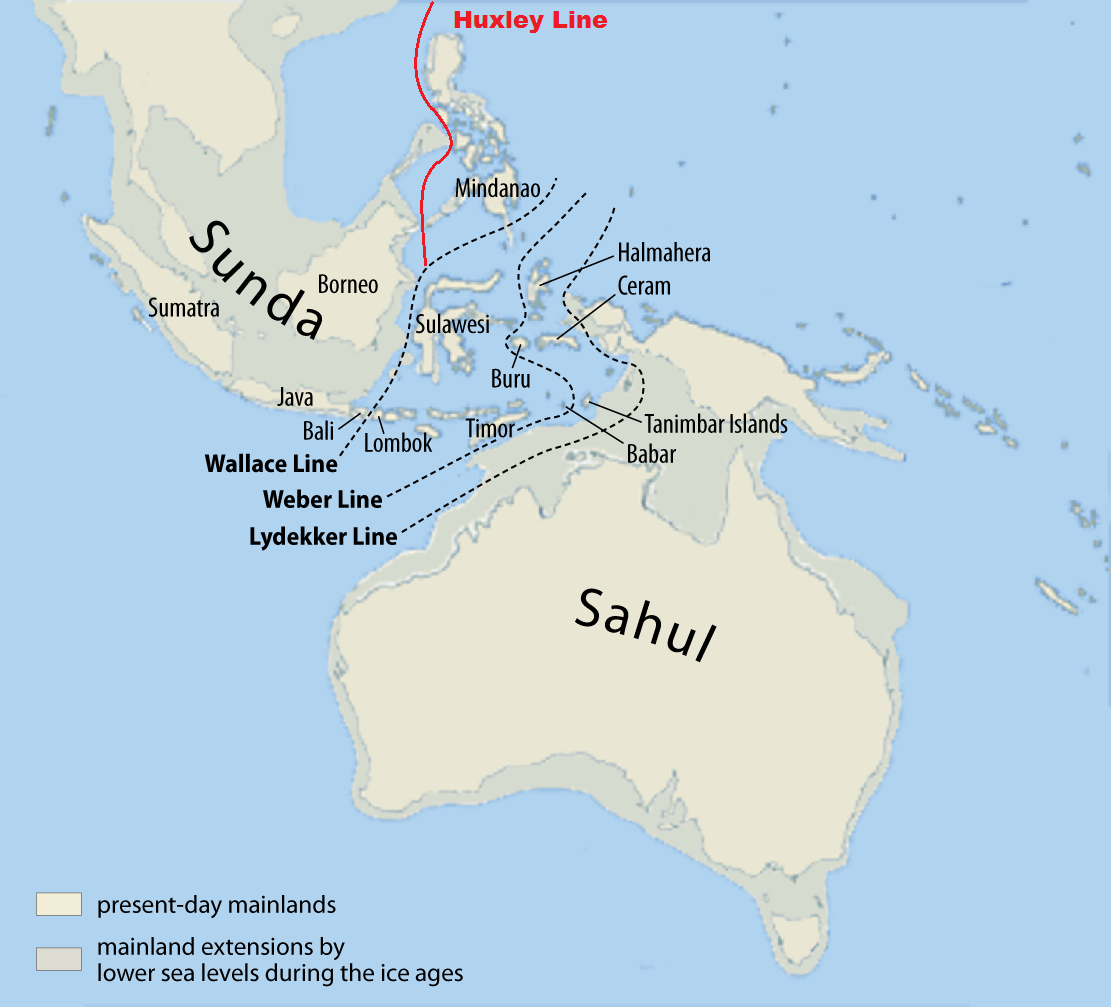
The ancestors of H. luzonensis crossed the Huxley Line into the Philippines.

Because Luzon has always been an island in the Quaternary, the ancestors of H. luzonensis would have had to have made a substantial sea crossing over the Huxley Line.

About 90% of the bone fragments from Callao Cave belong to the Philippine deer, which suggests that deer carcasses were periodically brought into the cave. With the exception of Palawan (where there were tigers), there is no evidence of large carnivores ever inhabiting the Philippines during the Pleistocene, which attributes these remains to human activity. The Philippine warty pig and an extinct bovid were also present. There are cut marks on a deer tibia, and a lack of tools in the cave could either have resulted from the use of organic material for tools rather than stone, or the processing of meat away from the cave.

The Rizal Archaeological Site situated in Rizal, Kalinga, Philippines and within an area that has been subject to archaeological explorations since the 1950s, yielded an almost complete skeleton of a rhino (the extinct Nesorhinus philippinensis), which had been butchered by early hominins c. 709,000 years ago. Together with the rhinoceros skeleton, six lithic cores, forty-nine lithic flakes, and two hammerstones, were found at the Rizal site. Some cores and the used lithic raw material show a similarity to the chert assemblage from the Lower Paleolithic Arubo 1 site in central Luzon. Also present were the remains of the elephant-relative Stegodon, the Philippine deer, freshwater turtles, and monitor lizards.

== See also ==
- Denisovan – Archaic human species from Asia
- Homo floresiensis – Extinct small human species found in Flores
- Homo naledi – South African archaic human species
- Neanderthal – Extinct species of human
- Tabon Man – Oldest modern human remains from the Philippines
