= Montmaurin-La Niche mandible =

Hominin fossil and population

Monmaurin-La Niche mandible
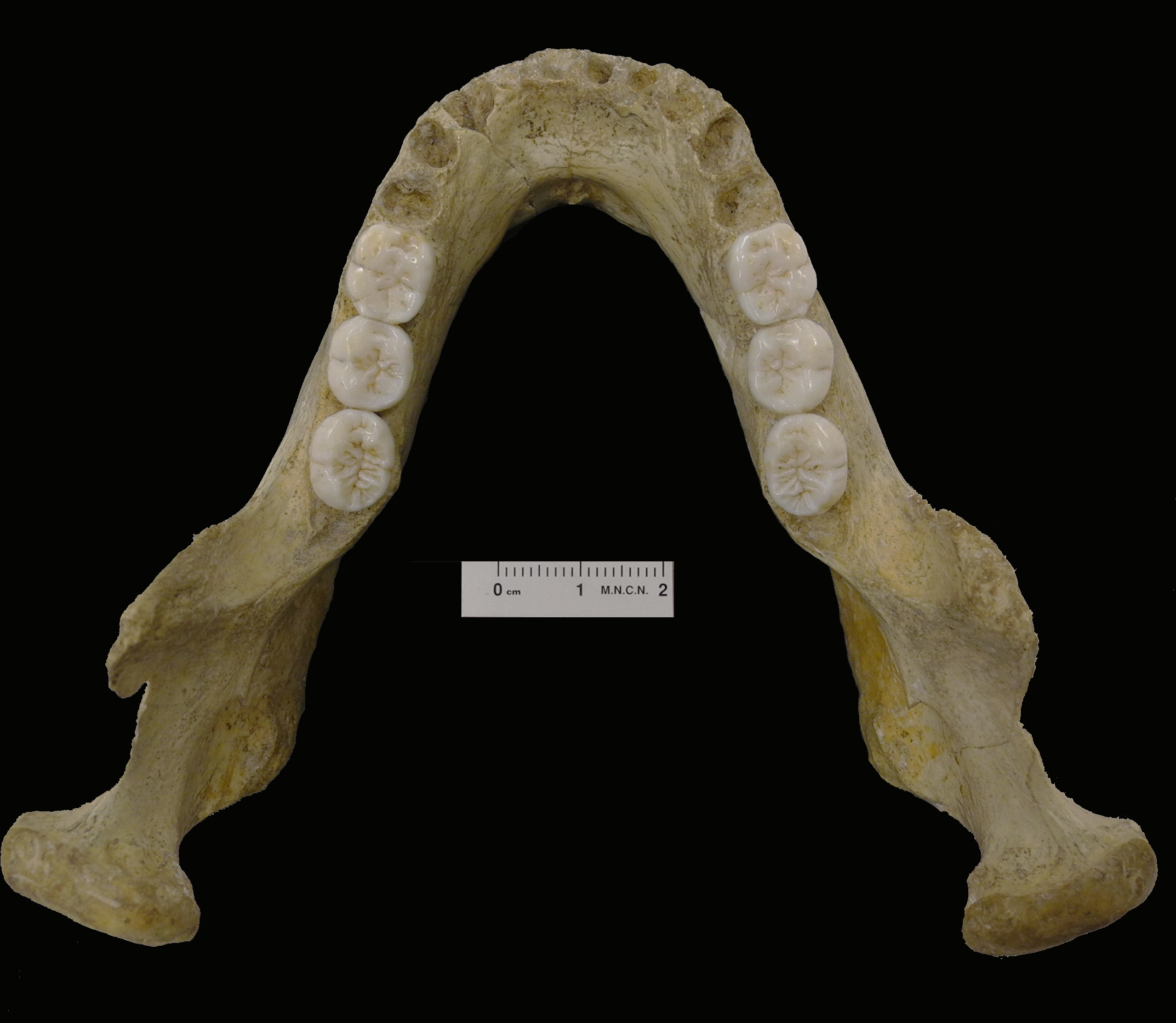
- Catalog no.: M-LN
- Common name: Monmaurin-La Niche mandible
- Species: Homo heidelbergensis?
- Age: ~250 kya
- Place discovered: Haute-Garonne, France
- Date discovered: 1949
- Discovered by: Louis Mèroc

The Montmaurin-La Niche (M-LN) mandible is a fossil jawbone with teeth discovered by Louis Mèroc on 18 June 1949. As well as the mandible, a collection of hominin remains including another mandible, teeth, and maxilla were discovered in the neighboring Coupe-Gorge cavity. They probably represent the same lineage of hominin, dated precisely to around 250,000 years and likely represent a distinct lineage of southern Middle Pleistocene hominins.

== History ==
The karst system of Montmaurin is formed by eight infilled chambers that were excavated from 1946 to 1961 by Louis Mèroc and his team. The La Niche cave is a vertical shaft where, on 18 June 1949, Raoul Cammas and his team discovered a set of ancient human remains and tools that they initially dated to the 'Mindel-Riss' interglacial. One of the most important finds was an intact mandible first described in detail in 1977. The jaw initiated discussion about human settlement in Europe, and it was classed as Pre-Neanderthal.

Most of the human remains belong to the Coupe-Gorge cavity, which presented a juvenile symphyseal fragment, right maxilla with P4-C and three teeth. Alongside the mandible in La Niche, a broken tibia and two vertebrae (one twelfth thoracic) were also discovered. They used a grid system to collect the position of the remains at Coupe-Gorge, but not at La Niche, where position and depth were noted instead. The Coupe-Gorge mandible sat in a position signifying the beginning of the last glaciation, while the maxilla and teeth were older. The M-LN mandible was dated in accordance with fauna to a more specific MIS 7.

== Description ==
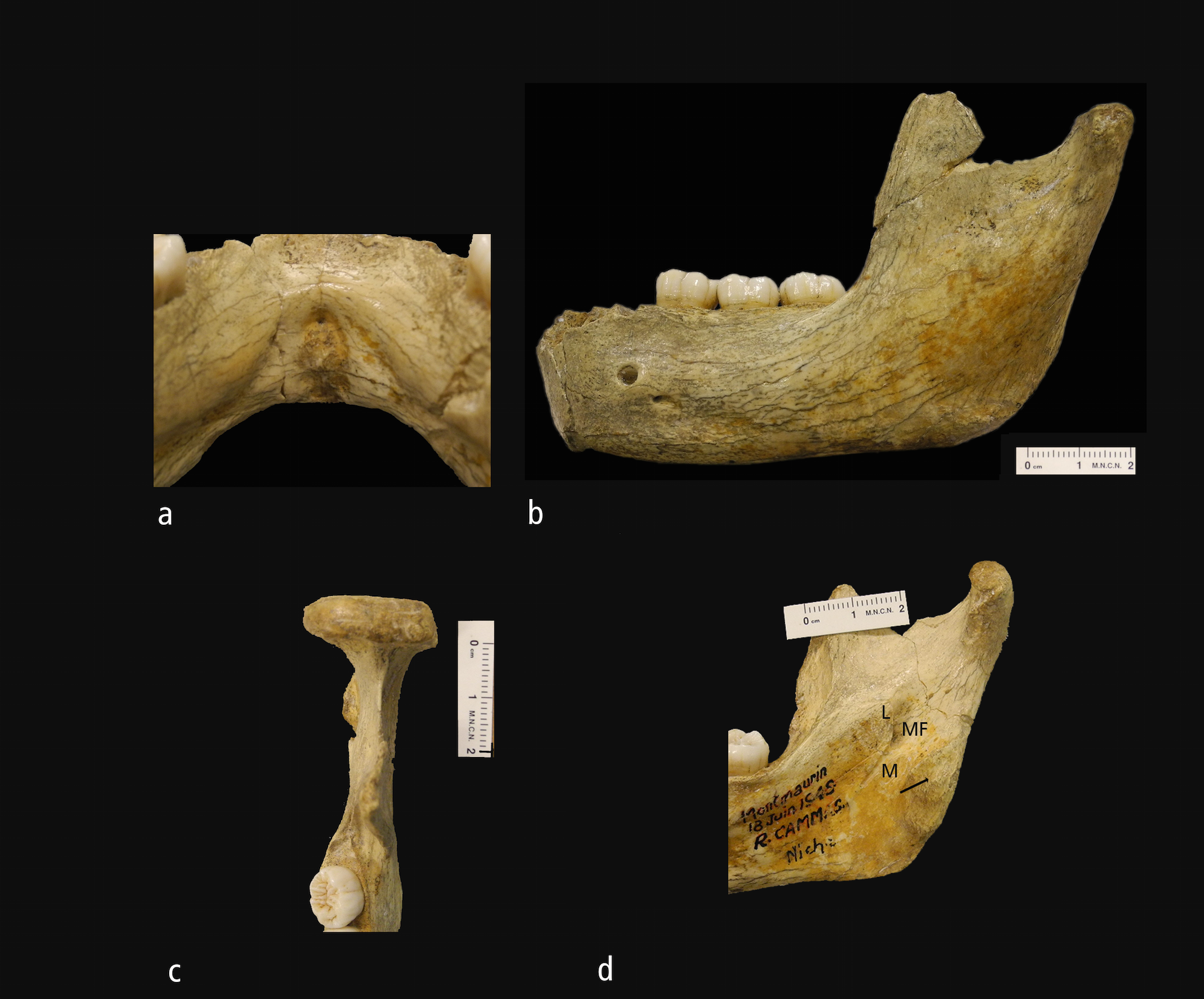

Montmaurin-La Niche includes an intact mandibular body and six teeth, only missing the upper alveolar wall and a portion of the internal right corpus wall aside from the missing teeth. One edge of the right ascending ramus, left coronoid, and both sigmoid notches are damaged and the body has a few cracks. This suggests that the bone underwent weathering before deposition. Overall, the state of the bone is in very good condition and the teeth are excellently preserved. On the first molars, they are rectangular with rounded edges and five developed cusps, missing a deflecting wrinkle, talonid crest, or protostylid. The EDJ surface is alike many hominins of similar age, and the hypotaurodont pulp cavity is seen in Neanderthals. The second molars have four cusps, which is common in most Homo sapiens populations. Their pulp cavity, like the first molars, are also much like Neanderthals. The third molars have five cusps and similar Neanderthal characters.

The La Niche mandible does not have a chin, but is clearly receding. The specimen was initially considered to be female, but Vialet et al. (2018) suggests that this is worthy of consideration because, contrasted with other similar specimens, it may explain why certain traits are weakly expressed. However, these features (sulcus intertoralis, prominentia lateralis, crista ectocondyloidea) are not imperative and do not inform taxonomic classification. Using the Sima de los Huesos Neanderthal sample, which encompasses both sexes, they conclude that sexual dimorphic traits do not alter apomorphic trait expression.

The Coupe-Gorge mandible is, similarly to La Niche, not fully Neanderthal in anatomy. The alveolar planum, slight facial extension, and regular convexity of the dental arch signify that the hominin of Coupe-Gorge and La Niche were probably the same lineage.

== Classification ==
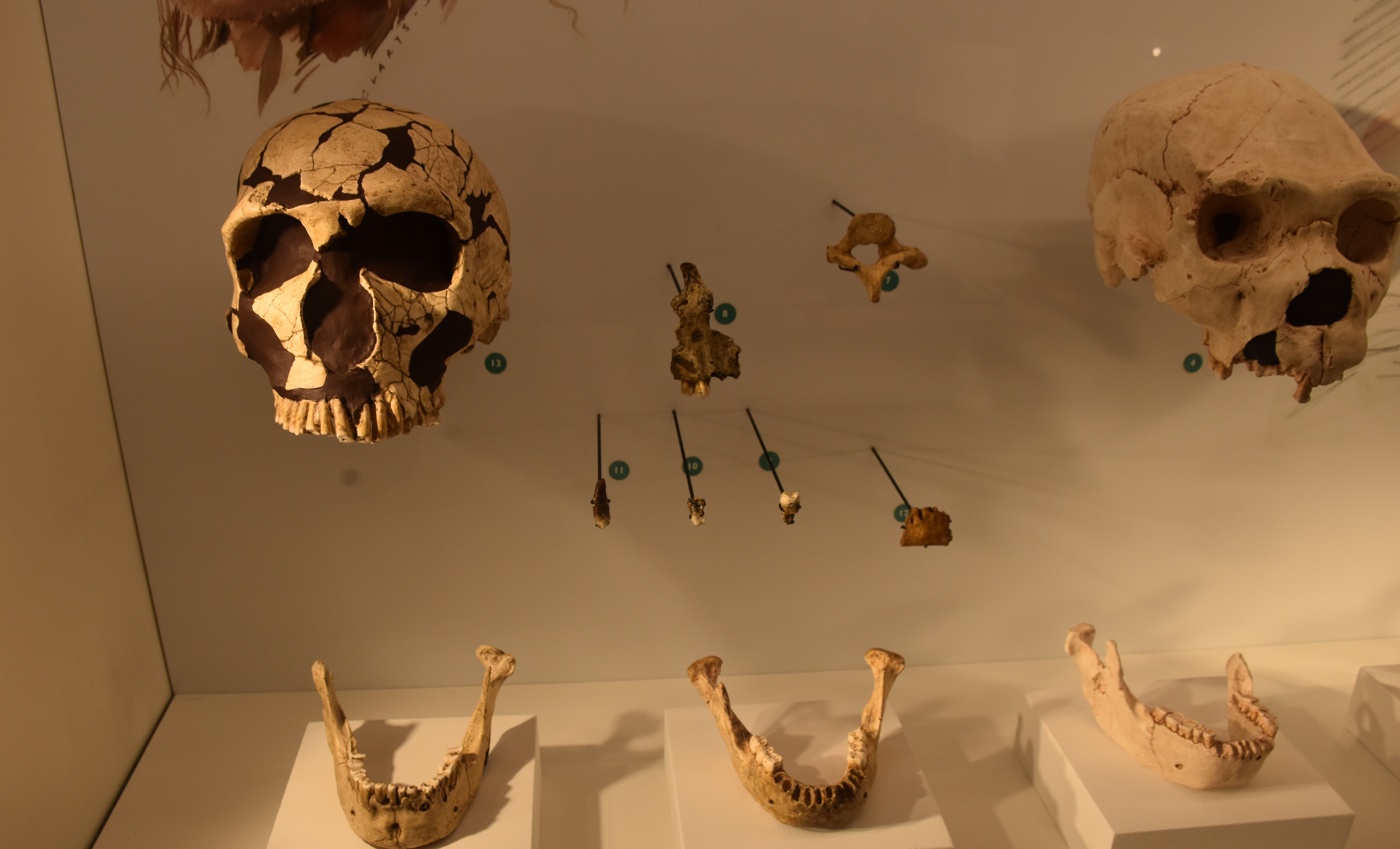
The La Niche mandible (bottom middle) surrounded by Neanderthal specimens and the hominin remains from Coupe-Gorge (top middle, numbered 7, 8, 9, 10, 11, 12).

According to Martín-Francés (2020), the mandible falls within the range of Neanderthals based on the bloated pulp cavities and robusticity, but the primitive mandible suggests affinities with an earlier population. They conclude that the mosaic traits of the mandible, including Neanderthal-like dentine surfaces and apomorphic traits seen in Neanderthals and various other hominins, suggests the presence of at least two European lineages during this time. They reason that Middle Pleistocene hominin fossils tend to either contain the Neanderthal suite of anatomy, or exhibit few identifiers, like the remains of Mauer, Mala Balanica, or Arago. As such, Montmaurin-La Niche is classified with the latter three as a discontinuous lineage over several migrations. Middle Pleistocene hominin fossils present a complicated scenario, which Martín-Francés explains as the result of genetic drift, adaptation, founder effect, and hybridization between old and new residents.

This would confirm the analysis of the Coupe-Gorge and La Niche materials by Vialet et al. (2019), who suggested the Neanderthals were present to the north while a more plesiomorphic lineage lived in the south. They considered these specimens as well as Lazaret and Arago as being part of a lineage preserving a more ancient suite. However, they also presented a scenario where they may be Neanderthals, but only if the facial anatomy arrived later than the dental and cranial anatomy. A year before, the team hypothesized that Neanderthals and Homo heidelbergensis were chronospecies that arose near the end of the Middle Pleistocene in the Levantine Corridor, first in the mandible, concurrent with the two-stage model of Neanderthal evolution. The Levantine would have been continuously populated, and served as an ecological hotspot.

== Technology ==
Part of the Montmaurin system is a site known as La Terrasse, excavated by the same crew and presenting two Upper Acheulean layers. These tools were sourced from local quartzite and made into different forms of choppers as well as bifaces. Layer 2 is the oldest layer, dating to the same time as the La Niche mandible, and layer 1 may represent the return of difficult weather conditions, as signified by the material used. Hominins in layer 2 did not use as much quartzite. The two layers do not otherwise present much general difference, which suggests that the same population lived in the cave system over a very long time. However, the upper group are much more crude, being large, harshly retouched, and originating more often from debris, indicative of the creation of large, impact-resistant tools. This is probably in response to dietary needs, and in part climate change. At some point, the cave roof collapsed, exposing it to the elements and forcing the inhabitants to occupy Coupe-Gorge.

== Paleoecology ==
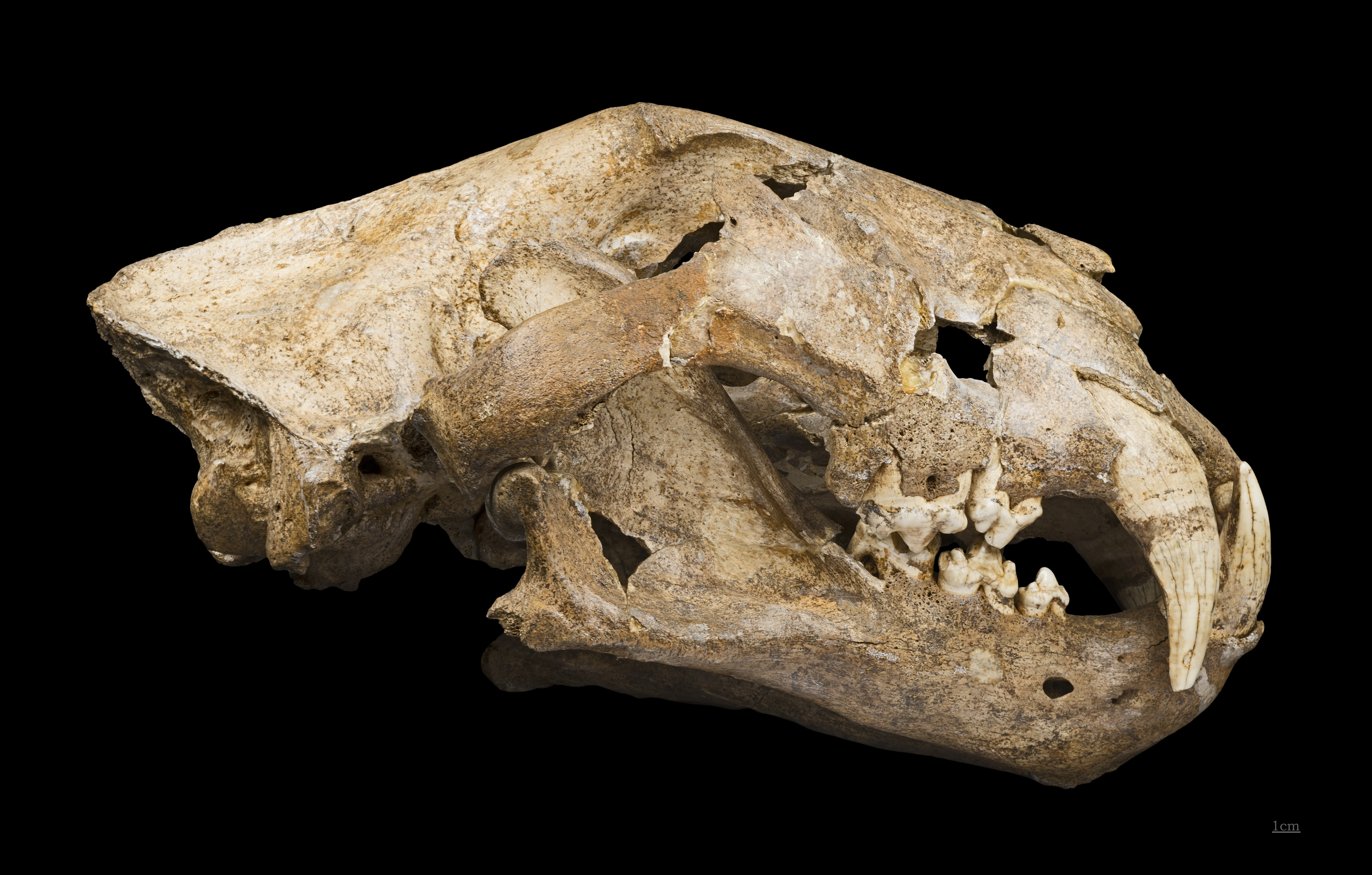
Carnivores like this Panthera spelaea, an individual recovered from the chamber, used La Niche intermittently as a den.

There is minimal evolutionary differences between the C layer assemblages, although the transition from wolf to bear occupations is notable. Marks on herbivore remains suggests that La Niche was a carnivore den. Three horse and auroch bones bear cuts, and association with human and lithic remains. As such, it appears that occupations varied. Abundant red deer on level C is unresolved, but human causes can be excluded because there are no signs of defleshing. The cave being a sinkhole could not be excluded, and neither could the possibility that La Niche and Coupe-Gorge are connected. Generally, La Niche was a site of various occupation based on the rarity of human cutmarks, and bears used the site for hibernation.
