= Fuyan Cave =

Cave complex and archaeological site in China

- 福岩洞 (Chinese)
- Location within China
- 25°39′02.7″N 111°28′49.2″E
- Location: Hunan, China

Site notes
- Excavation dates: 2011, 2013

Fuyan Cave (Chinese: 福岩洞) is a complex of limestone caves in the south-central Chinese village of Tangbei, Hunan, known for the discovery of the oldest evidence for unambiguously fully modern humans outside Africa. 47 human teeth, dating to between 80,000 and 120,000 years ago, were discovered at Fuyan Cave. The teeth are also unusual for showing signs of cavities, a feature typically not found in teeth older than 50,000 years. However, a later study focusing on autosomal DNA analysis of the remains challenged this assertion, and found that the remains were younger than previously suspected.

== Geology ==
Fuyan consists of three caves connected by tunnels. The cave system has a volume of 3,000 m^{3} (110,000 cu ft) and ranges over 3 km^{2} (1.2 sq mi).

== Discovery ==
Fuyan Cave was discovered in 1984. The cave is located at latitude 25°39′02.7″N, longitude 111°28′49.2″E, at 232 m above sea level.

The cave was excavated in 2011 over an area of 20 m^{2} (220 sq ft). The 2011 excavation revealed 5 hominin teeth and fossil remains from 39 different mammalians species, including some extinct ones. The cave was excavated in 2011 and in 2013. The teeth were all discovered in the middle cave.

== Dating ==
The teeth were dated by dating nearby stalagmites. The stalagmites were dated to at least 80,000 years. Since the teeth were found under rock over which the stalagmites had grown, the teeth must be older than 80,000 years old. More recent ancient DNA analysis of these remains indicated that the remains dated instead to the Holocene, although these recent findings are still under review.

Specimen number FY-HT2 (9380±90 BP) in new study was incorrect identified as human teeth. Reconstructions of "deer-like" wear bear no resemblance to the preservational reality of the tooth FY-HT-2.

== Implications ==
The discovery is important for many reasons. Previous to this discovery, the earliest evidence for fully modern humans outside the Arabian Peninsula (Tianyuan Cave, Niah Cave, Mungo Man) dates to around 40,000 to 50,000 years, so the discovery at Fuyan Cave provides evidence showing that humans migrated out of Africa a lot earlier than previously assumed. Secondly, the finds at Fuyan Cave are much closer to modern humans than they are to contemporary finds at Xujiayao and Qafzeh. Thirdly, the discovery shows that modern humans arrived in southern China when there was an older, more primitive hominin present in northern China. Lastly, the discovery shows that modern humans were present in Asia at a time when there is no evidence for fully modern humans in Europe (43,000 BC), which is perhaps explained by the presence of Neanderthals in Europe preventing the entry of the modern humans.

== See also ==
- Zhiren Cave
