= Tianyuan Cave =

Cave and archaeological site in China

- Location in China
- 39°39′28″N 115°52′17″E
- Periods: Paleolithic China

History
- Built: 42,000 BP
- Abandoned: 39,000 BP

Tianyuan Cave (simplified Chinese: 田园洞; traditional Chinese: 田園洞; pinyin: Tiányuán Dòng) is near Beijing (not in Tianyuan District), where Tianyuan man, one of the earliest modern humans, was found.

The remains in the Tianyuan Cave have ancestral relations "to many present-day Asians and Native Americans".

== See also ==
- Niah Caves
- Fuyan Cave
