= Zhiren Cave =

Cave and archaeological site in China

- 智人洞 (Chinese)
- location in China
- 22°17′13.6″N 107°30′45.1″E
- Periods: early Late Pleistocene
- Location: Guangxi, China

Zhiren Cave (Chinese: 智人洞) is a karstic cave in the Mulan Mountains that overlooks the Hejiang River in Chongzuo, Guangxi, China. Zhiren Cave is an early Late Pleistocene site that has yielded the fossil remains of possibly anatomically modern humans with some mixed archaic human features.

== Fossils ==
The fossil remains were discovered by Chinese paleontologists in 2007. The fossils were covered by a continuous layer of flowstone, a layer that was initially dated to around 113,000 to 100,000 BP. A more thorough re-dating was later undertaken, and gives an estimated date of around 116,000 to 106,000 BP.

Some of the large mammal remains discovered at Zhiren Cave include those from Pongo pygmaeus, Elephas kiangnanensis, Elephas maximus, Megatapirus augustus, Rhinoceros sinensis, Megalovis guangxiensis, Cervus unicolor, Ursus thibetanus, Arctonyx collaris and Panthera pardus. Around 25% of the large mammal species discovered at the site are now extinct.

Three pieces of hominin remains were identified: two upper molars (Zhiren 1 and Zhiren 2) and an anterior mandible (Zhiren 3). The fossils are believed to have belonged to at least two different individuals, as Zhiren 1 and Zhiren 3 are unlikely to have come from the same individual.

When compared to Late Pleistocene fossils from western Eurasia, Zhiren 1 and Zhiren 2 are smaller and would be classified as modern; however, the comparative context is lacking in East Asian Late Pleistocene fossils. Zhiren 2 shows evidence for dental winging in its lower incisors, a feature that has only been found in Homo sapiens.

Zhiren 3 contains a mix of archaic and modern human features. The most significant aspect of Zhiren 3 is that it has a distinctively modern human chin. Coupled with the dating, Zhiren 3 could possibly represent the earliest modern human fossil in East Asia. However, many were skeptical of this conclusion, since this would significantly push back the general consensus on the dating of human migration out of Africa. Peter Bellwood also cites the lack of archaeological finds (such as Neanderthal stone tools or tooth pendants) associated with the fossils.

== See also ==
- Fuyan Cave
