= Simanya Neanderthals =

Neanderthal fossils from a cave in Spain

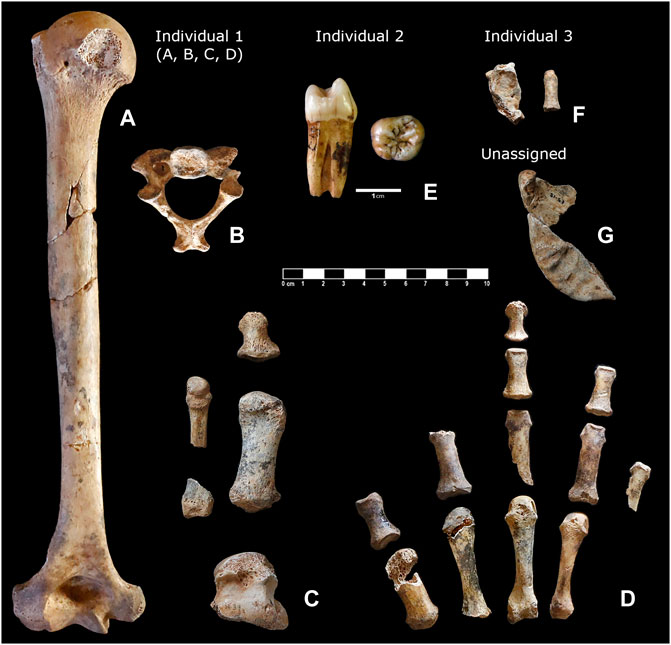
- Catalog no.: SI-1–SI-60
- Common name: Simanya Neanderthals
- Species: Homo neanderthalensis
- Age: 42,440–42,110 years
- Place discovered: Simanya Cave, Vallès Occidental
- Date discovered: 1978–79, 2022
- Discovered by: Miguel Aznar

The Simanya Neanderthals is a large collection of Homo neanderthalensis fossils discovered in Simanya Cave, Spain. The collection represents three individuals, possibly more, of various ages. These people belong to the latest stage in Neanderthal development, and may shed light on the persistence of archaic groups before they became extinct.

== History ==
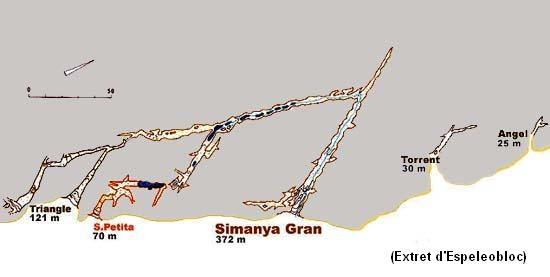

From 1978 to 1979, amateur fossil collector Miguel Aznar discovered a set of anthropological and archeological findings from the surface as well as a small excavation that would later become known as the "Museum Collection". Since Simanya Cave hosts a span of human history, Aznar's findings include human and animal fossil material, pottery, and fragmentary chert on the surface and human and animal fossil material, charcoal, sediment, and carbonate crusts during the excavation. Aznar dug in an area of reddish breccia abundant in charcoal, and did not discover any Holocene artifacts (such as pottery) during it.

In 1986, he donated 143 fossils to the Museum of Archaeology of Catalonia and two additional bags of small material, the majority being nondiagnostic, in 2021. Study of the initial hominin material noted that, despite the sediment, the fossils remained in good condition. However, fractures and adhesive alterations were caused during modern handling of the remains, and as such they were cleaned and mended with resin to prevent decay.

From 2020 to 2022, new excavations at Simanya Cave were conducted in order to better understand Aznar's findings. One of such took place at the IMG sector, the same location of the first specimens. Here, surveyors discovered SI-60, a Neanderthal tooth, However, Aznar's excavation pit was unable to be analyzed in a modern context because unrestricted public access evened it out. The fossils were dated to 42.440-42.110 ka, and the charcoals date to less than 49 ka. Modern analysis unsuccessfully attempted to extract aDNA from the tooth. "Simanya Neanderthals" was self-termed by the first authors.

== Description ==
54 human remains dating to the Pleistocene were recovered from Simanya Cave, which encompasses both dentitions, a mandibular fragment, vertebrae, humeri, hand elements, and foot elements. Some are in good condition and others are fragmentary or sustain modern damage most likely caused during the excavation process. No pathologies were reported, and the dentition does not strongly suggest that the mouth was used for strenuous tasks. Three individuals were identified, with the most complete including a fully intact humerus (SI-1) as well as another humerus, two hands, and a vertebra categorized as the same individual based on size and taphonomic wear. She is estimated to have stood 154 ± 4.89 cm, indicating a female.

Upper left P3 SI-7 belonged to an individual roughly 11.5 years of age. SI-60, an upper left M3 crown was aged at 12.5-13.5 years but later revised to 1..5 years based on the accelerated aging of Neanderthals. As such they are believed to represent a second person. A third person is represented by SI-29 (a first phalanx of the hand belonging to ray V) and SI-37 (a right atlas fragment with upper and lower articular facets). The phalanx indicates an age of 7.61-7.78 years. The atlas is unfused at the neurocentral junction despite the individual being large in size. This un-fusing is typical in Neanderthals and agrees with the age estimate of 7.7 years.

The lower dentition, SI-3 (I1) and the M3, are quite small, whereas Si-5 (P3) represents the upper size limit, SI-45 (I1) is intermediate, and SI-4 and SI-31 (I2) are much larger than the Neanderthal spectrum. Most of the teeth are assigned to the first individual based on taphonomy, but the addition of possible other members cannot be ruled out based on the range of sizes present. Adult teeth are not assigned to an individual, however occlusal wear of one set suggests a mature adult, possibly 30-40 years. The remains bear a suite of apomorphic features, supporting assignment as the most derived stage of Homo neanderthalensis.

== Classification ==
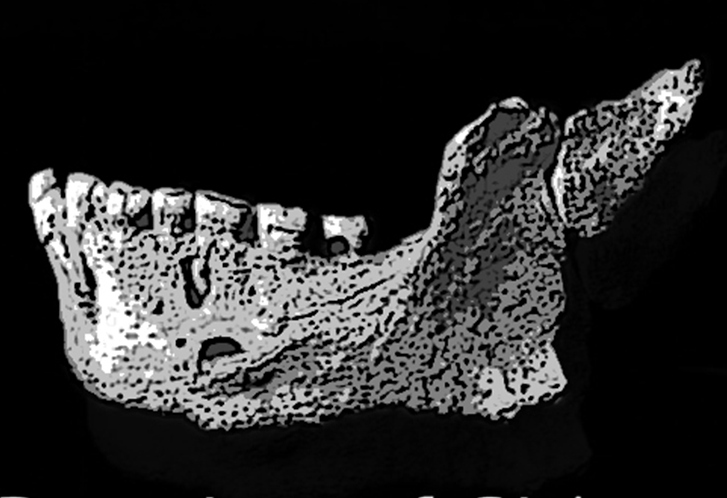
Sidron 2, an individual that is similar to the Simanya Neanderthals

Apomorphies in the collection suggests that these hominins are the latest evolutionary stage, and their anatomy matches with other western Neanderthal populations. The team attempted to retrieve genetic material from the fossils but failed, and they do not rule out the possibly that several genetic variants close in morphology may have existed. They occupy an upper range of 49 ka and a lowermost boundary of 42 ka and are very similar to El Sidrón, a plesiomorphic population. This lends favor to the possibility of persisting genetic morphs in this region. It is unknown if the Simanya sample resides within a relict group.

== Technology ==
Simanya Cave hosts an interspersed Mousterian industry 70 meters within. One small lithic and faunal assemblage, Sus scrofa and Cervus elephus, is known, with the animal bones being cut and sustaining green breakage patterns. As well, a small and flat combustion feature, a thick collection of burnt remains, was recorded. Of the lithics include core-trimming flakes, sidescrapers, butts with multifacets, dorsoventral right angles, and centripetal dorsal scar patterns, all of which suggests Mousterian affinities. Lithics are known from layers that produce human bone.

== Paleoecology ==
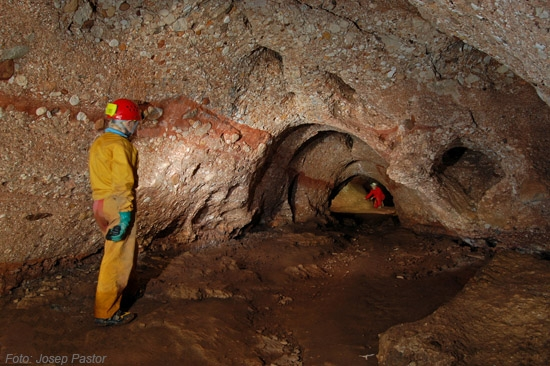
Interior of the main gallery of Simanya Cave

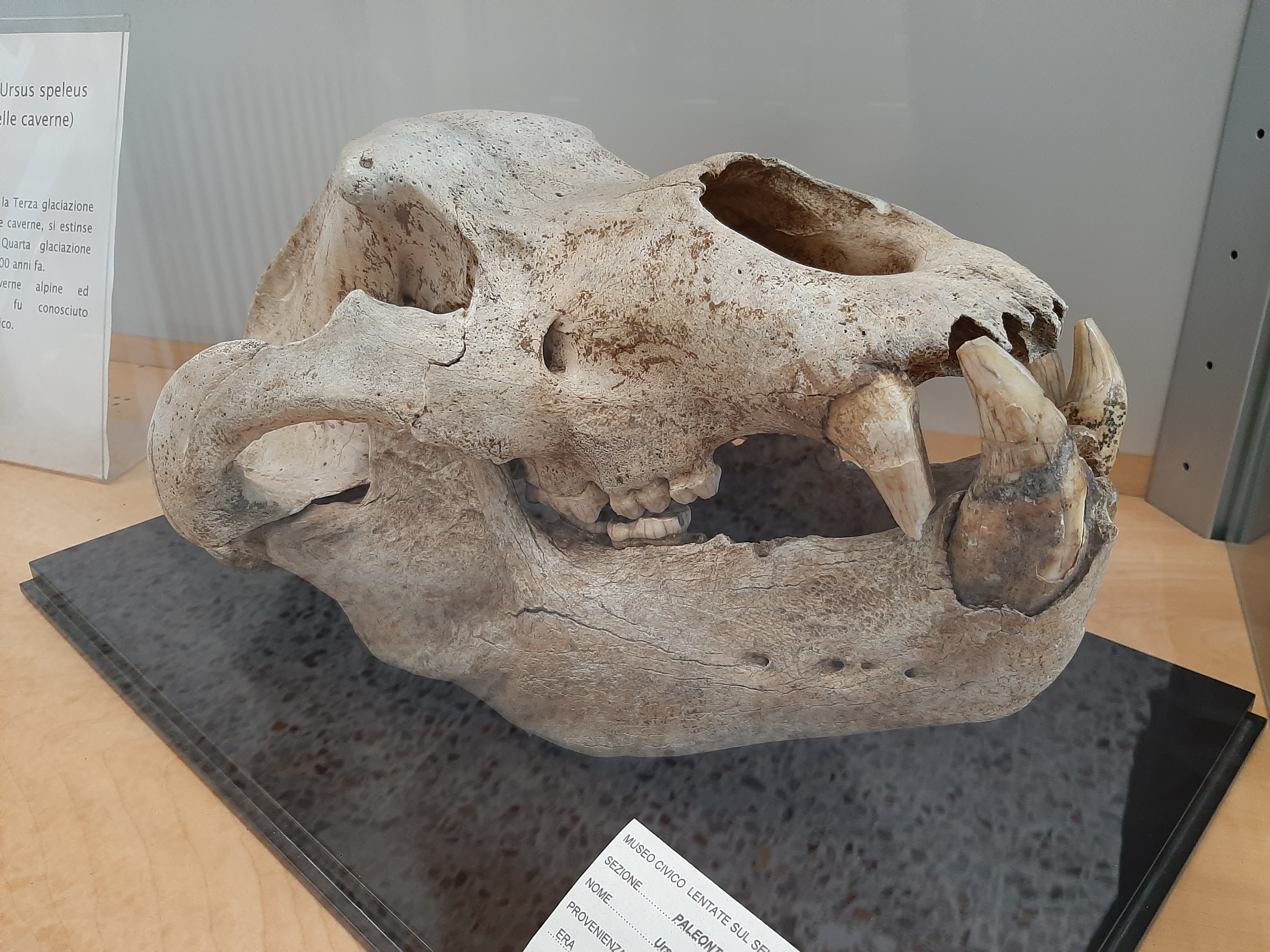
Ursus cf. spelaeus is found in some parts of Simanya

While the hominin skeletal remains themselves date to around 42 ka, the charcoals retrieved from Simanya Cave are confirmed to be older, at least 49 ka in age. Simanya Cave is well documented to preserve several cultural stages in human history, including a 5-30 cm-thick Holocene cap and a primary sequence that dated to the Pleistocene. Aznar's discoveries were found within and atop the IMG sector, which was homogenized since excavations due to unrestricted access from the public, is well documented to consist of Unit 3G1; a red-brown polygenic limestone, sandstone, and slate conglomerate supported by matrix and characterized by an erosive base that is exclusive to this specific locality. The cave also preserves Usus cf. arctos, cf. spelaeus, and Capra pyrenaica. The bears are believed to have died during hibernation, while the ibex are thought to have been dragged by a predator such as a felid. Additionally, gravity and water flow may have transported remains into the formation.
