= Simanya Cave =

Cave and archaeological site in Catalonia

- Carrer Cova Simanya
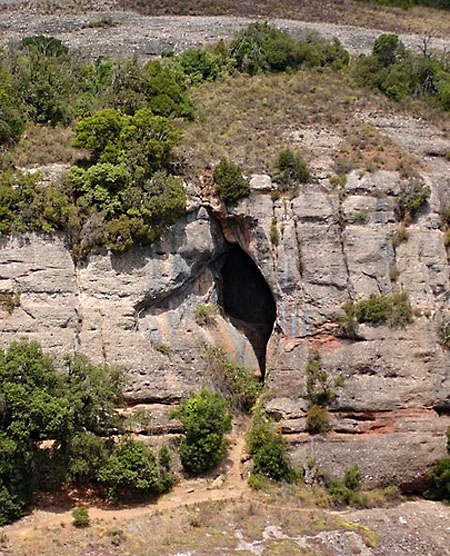
- Cave entrance

- Location within Europe Location within Spain
- Location: Natural Park of Sant Llorenç del Munt i l'Obac
- Coordinates: 41.6741°N 2.0090°E
- Length: 372 m
- Elevation: 885 m
- Geology: conglomerate

Simanya Cave or Great Simanya Cave is a cave in the Sant Llorenç del Munt massif located in the municipality of Sant Llorenç Savall, in Vallès Occidental. It has a route of 372 m and a gradient of 8 m. The entrance is 885 m in height. It is in the Llor canal on the eastern side of Montcau (1,056 m) and at a distance of almost 400 m from the summit. It is a hypogean talveg of karst origin formed by conglomerate.

The cave is part of a set of five systems that correspond to the same karst system. From south to north they are: Triangle cave (38 m), Simanya Petita cave (60 m), Simanya cave, Torrent cave (38 m), and Àngel cave (18 m). The five caves make up the so-called "complex de les Simanyes" or "Simanyes caves" and form the same unit that have been separated due to duct blockage.

It is within the boundaries of the Natural Park of Sant Llorenç del Munt i l'Obac, created in 1972. Since 2000, it has also been part of the Inventory of Geological Interest Areas of Catalonia (IEIGC), inventoried as an area of geological interest in the Sant Llorenç del Munt i l'Obac GeoZone.

The cave has been declared a Cultural Asset of Local Interest by the Department of Culture of Catalonia and listed as an element of natural heritage in the Cultural Heritage Map of the Provincial Council of Barcelona.

== Toponymy ==
The toponym "Simanya" comes from the Latin sima magna, or "big cave". The word sima comes from the ancient Greek σιμός ("sīmós"; hole) and magna from Proto-Italic *magnos, from Proto-Indo-European *m̥ǵh₂nós, from the root *méǵh₂s ("big").

The Simanya Cave is sometimes called the Great Simanya Cave, to distinguish it from the neighboring Simanya Petita Cave.

== History ==
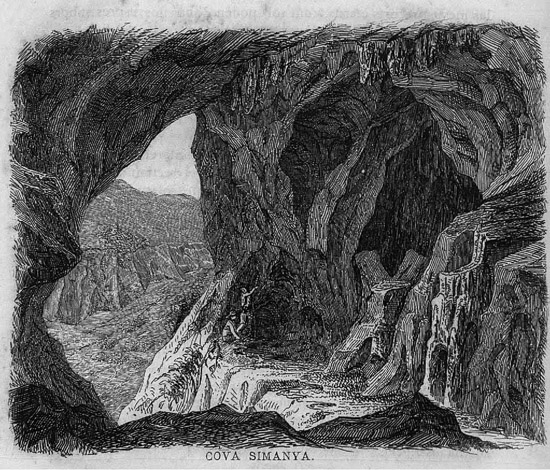
Lluís Rigalt's plate depicting the interior-out view of the cave entrance.

The Simanya Cave is mentioned and described in an imaginative way by the historian and chronicler Jeroni Pujades in his Universal Chronicle of the Principality of Catalonia, published 1609.

During the 19th and early 20th centuries it is recorded that it was visited by Cèsar August Torras i Ferreri (1851–1923); Norbert Font i Sagué (1873–1910); the paleontologist and geologist Marià Faura i Sans (1886–1941); and Domènec Palet i Barba (1872–1953), among others. During the last third of the 19th century, it was visited by the painter and draftsman Lluís Rigalt (1814–1894), who drew a plate on it that illustrates the entrance of the cave seen from the inside.

The first known topography was made by members of the Terrassa Excursionist Center on May 7, 1911. Between 1929 and 1930, archaeological surveys were carried out led by Pau Codina, in which a large amount of pottery was found from the Chalcolithic. A few years later, the topographer Josep Closas i Miralles (1900–1962) made a new plan that was published in 1944 by the geologist and speleologist Noel Llopis i Lladó (1911–1968).

In the 1960s, two different groups of speleologists made the most complete and recent topographic maps of the cavity to date. The first was made in 1964 by O. Andrés, JM Tomàs, R. Parera, and A. Masriera of the Underground Exploration Group of the Barcelona Mountain Club. The second was carried out by J. Castell, P. Blanch and V. Cussó from the Speleological Research Team of the Excursionist Center of Catalonia in 1966.

== Description ==
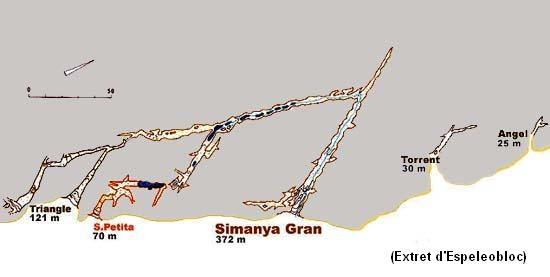
Topologies of Simanya Cave and neighboring caverns.

The Simanya Cave is part of an important complex of galleries interconnected with the neighboring cavities of the Simanya Petita Cave, the Simanya Nova Cave and the Àngel Cave.

The cavity has a large entrance mouth that accesses a rectilinear gallery from the northwest and ends 98 m further, progressively refilled with sediments. From the main gallery there are two forks, both on the left and the left to the southwest.

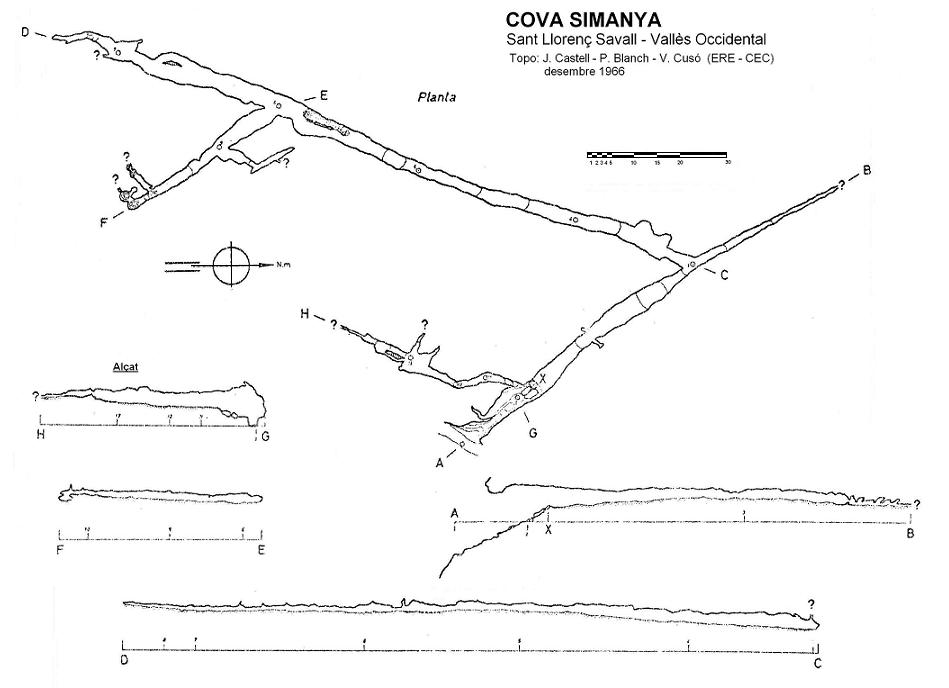
Topology of the cave as illustrated by the Speleological Research Team of the Excursionist Center of Catalonia in 1966.

The first is a little more than 10 m from the mouth, it is slightly ascending and ends in a narrow diaclasis almost 50 m from the beginning. The second is also straight and has an average width of 3 m. In the first half, it has triangular sections and small pools of water holding the remains of shattered gours. After about 80 m, this gallery reaches Pas de l'Oca, where heights rarely exceed 1 m or 1.5 m due to an increase in sediments, which end up almost completely covering the gallery. From this place, about 50 m later, the gallery reaches the end, where the link with the Triangle cave has been verified, but is not physically possible.

From Pas de l'Oca, on the left side, is another conduit, parallel to the entrance gallery and with small derivations. This gallery ends about 40 m on, where there are two wells excavated in the sediments. At this point there is a junction with the Simanya Petita cave, which is impassable due to the narrowness but proven since sounds reach weakly from one cavity to the other.

It was formed by an ancient underground river traced over a diaclase system in a network that should have stopped working in the middle of its youth phase and that should have drained in a much larger massif than the current Montcau. The reconstructive phenomena are of very little importance, and in periods of heavy rains, infiltrations occur that can flood some sections of the cavity. Simanya Gran is the main gallery.

== Biology ==
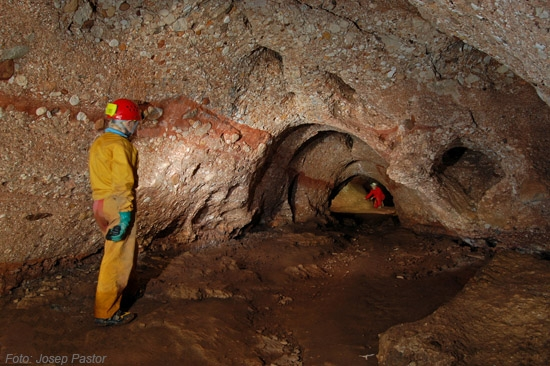
Interior principal gallery.

Inside the formation lives a colony of horseshoe bats (Rhinolophus ferrumequinum), a large species, which is why caving is prohibited between November 1 and May 31. They can be found both in caves and chasms, abandoned human habitations, and in several places within the Natural Park.

== Archeology ==
The Simanya Cave is one of the most interesting archaeological sites in the Sant Llorenç del Munt massif, as signs of continuous, yet irregular human occupation intervals from the Paleolithic period to the Middle Ages have been discovered.

=== Paleolithic–Chalcolithic ===
In 2023 the remains of at least three Neanderthal individuals, dubbed the Simanya Neanderthals, comprising 54 skeletal elements (dentition, mandible, vertebrae, and limbs) from Simanya Gran. The initial lot of 53 were excavated through the 1970s, and an additional periadolescent tooth was collected in 2021 during reevaluation of the stratigraphic context of the hominins warranted by recent archeological advancements. One individual is a short-statured adult, another is a periadolescent (~11.5 years), and an immature individual (~7.7 years). The diverse demographic is the most well-preserved of all northeastern Mediterranean Iberian Neanderthals. In 1911, ceramics from the Chalcolithic were discovered. Partial excavations during the 1930s yielded more prehistoric pottery.

=== Bronze Age–Middle Ages ===
Pottery from the Iberian and Middle Ages were discovered in 1911 and more in the 1930s during partial excavations by the Terrassa Excursionist Center under Joan Solà and Marià Galí. This suggests that human habitation of the site occurred in somewhat irregular intervals throughout human history. The fragments are housed at the Terrassa Art Museum, but the excavations in the 1930s were conducted without modern technique and were not exhaustive.
