= Philip Piper =

Zooarchaeologist

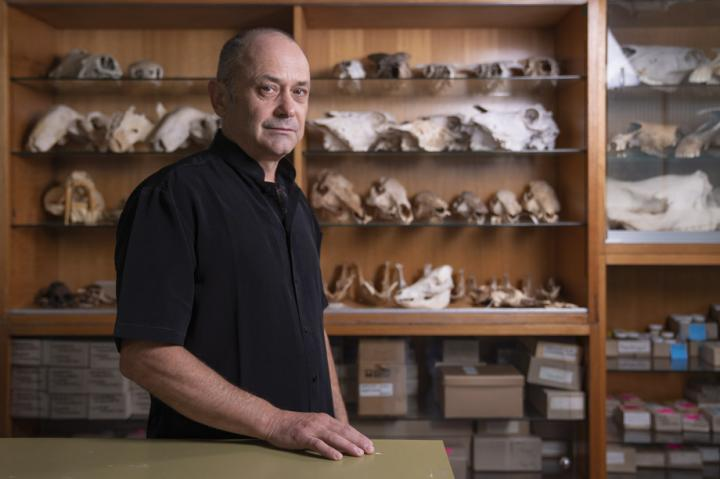
Prof. Philip Piper from the ANU School of Archaeology and Anthropology

Philip John Piper (born Devon, England, 1966) is a Professor of Archaeology in the School of Archaeology & Anthropology at the Australian National University (ANU) in Canberra. His research is instrumental in expanding research in Zooarchaeology and Paleoecology, particularly in Southeast Asia, and more recently in Vietnam.

He is currently the Secretary-General of the Indo-Pacific Prehistory Association. He was elected a Fellow of the Australian Academy of the Humanities in 2025.
