= Hadar, Ethiopia =

Historic site in Afar Region, Ethiopia

Hadar
- Site location in Ethiopia
- 11.167°N 40.633°E
- Type: Archaeological; Paleontology
- Periods: Middle - Late Pliocene
- Location: Mille district, Afar Region, Ethiopia
- Region: Eastern Africa

Site notes
- Excavation dates: 1970 - Ongoing
- Archaeologists: Donald Johanson; Maurice Taieb; Denis Geraads; Zeresenay Alemseged
- Condition: Excavated
- Owner: Ethiopian Government

Hadar or Hadar Formation (also spelled Qad daqar, Qadaqar; Afar "white [qidi] stream [daqar]") is a paleontological fossil site located in Mille district, Administrative Zone 1 of the Afar Region, Ethiopia, 15 km upstream (west) of the A1 road's bridge across the Awash River (Adayitu kebele).

It is situated on the southern edge of the Afar Triangle (part of East Africa's Great Rift Valley), along the left banks of the Awash River, between two minor tributaries, the eponymous Kada Hadar and the Kada Gona. In 1972, Taieb organized a small exploratory reconnaissance of the Afar region to investigate more paleontological finds there. After six weeks of exploration, the party focused on the Hadar site.

The site has yielded some of the most well-known hominin fossils, including "Lucy". These hominin fossils range in age from approximately 3.42 to 2.90 million years ago.

It is postulated that the specimens in the region were deposited by way of a large river system with associated crevasse channels/splays, deltas, and distributary channels, as well as periodic transgressions of paleolake Hadar located east of the research area (Aronson and Taieb, 1981, Tiercelin, 1986, Campisano and Feibel, in press) possibly related to geological activity or climatic cycles in at least the Kada Hadar Member (Yemane et al., 1996, Yemane, 1997, Campisano and Feibel, in press)."

According to Jon Kalb, early maps show caravan routes passing within 10 to 15 km of Hadar but not through it. The British explorer L.M. Nesbitt passed 15 km west of Hadar in 1928.

== Geology ==
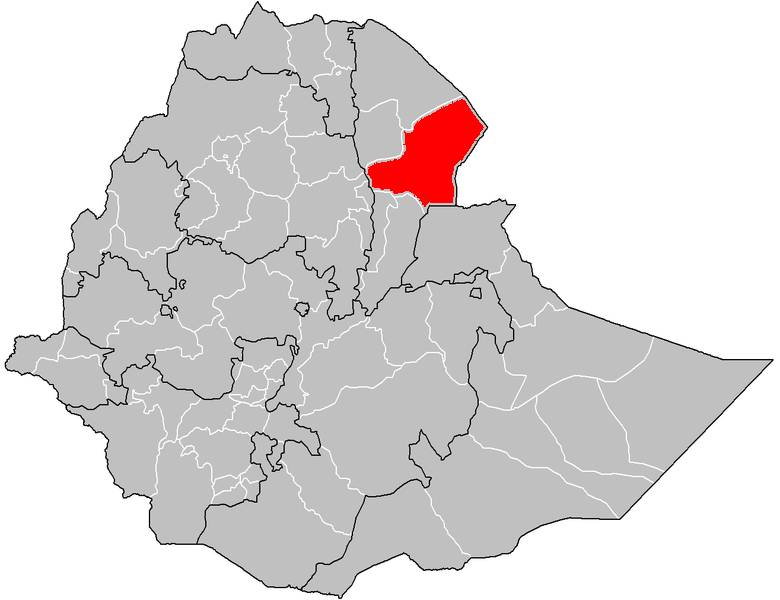
Administrative Zone 1 (Afar Region), Ethiopia

The region's rocks consist mainly of mudstones, siltstones, fine-grained sandstones and volcanic tuffs. The region of Hadar has been divided into four geologic members — Basal (~3.8–3.42 Ma), Sidi Hakoma (~3.42–3.26 Ma), Denen Dora (~3.26–3.2 Ma), and Kada Hadar (<~3.2 Ma)—with three tuffs (Sidi Hakoma Tuff [SHT], Triple Tuff [TT] and Kada Hadar Tuff [KHT]) separating the four members.

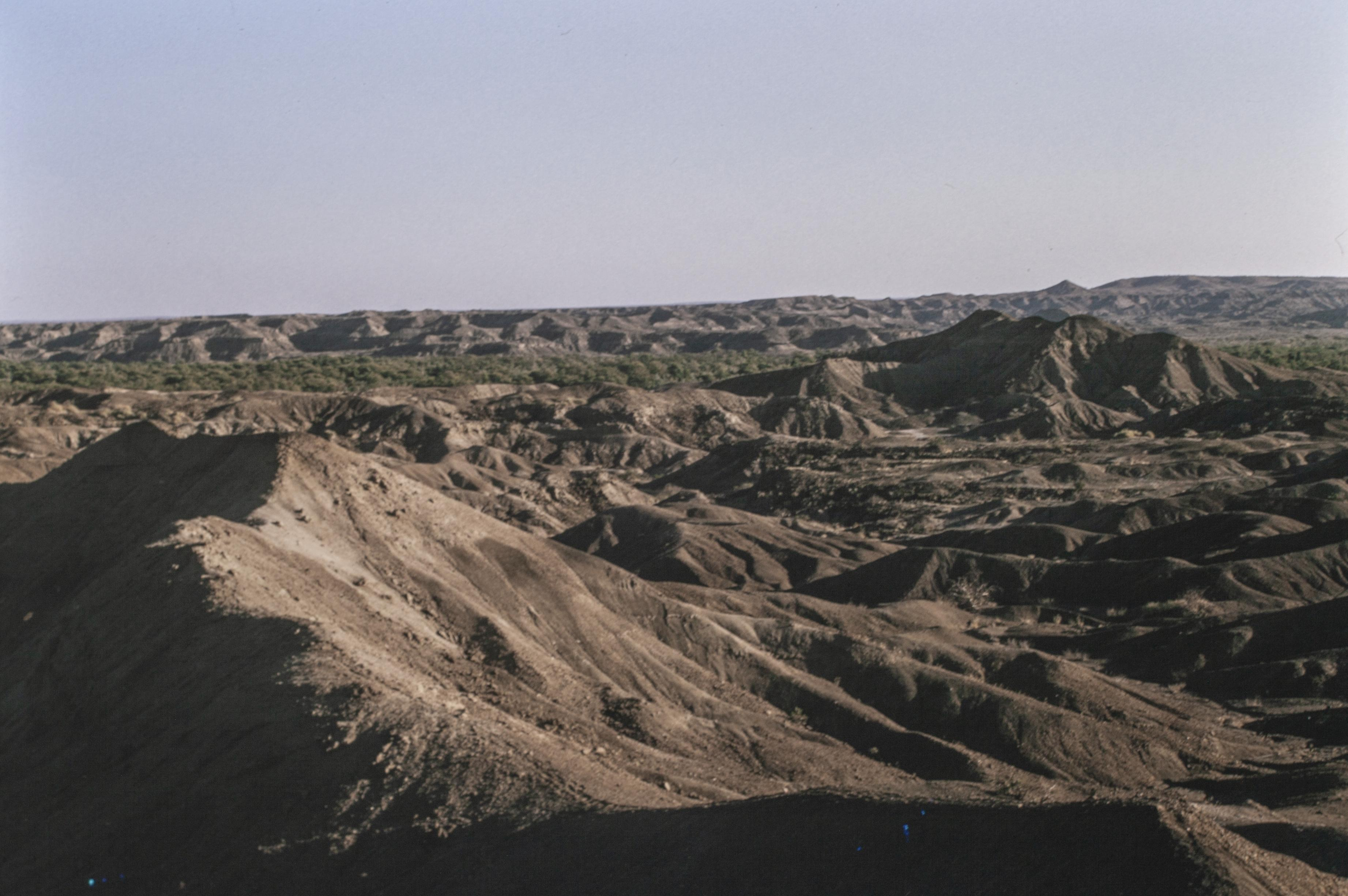
General view of the Hadar landscape, 1973

The Sidi Hakoma member tends towards high rainfall and low seasonality. The overlying Denan Dora Member was a grassland habitat. Finally, the Kada Hadar Member was an even more open and arid habitat, as seen in the high abundance of antilopines, which frequent these types of terrains.

== Paleontology ==
The first paleo-geological explorations of the Hadar area were conducted by Maurice Taieb. He found Hadar in December 1970 by following the Ledi River, which originates in the highlands north of Bati to empty into the Awash River. Taieb recovered several fossils in the area and led a party back to Hadar in May 1972. In October 1973, 16 individuals with the International Afar Research Expedition (IARE) arrived at Hadar and camped there for two months during which the first hominin fossil was found. (Taieb claims in his 1985 book Sur la Terre des premiers Hommes to have discovered the Hadar fields in 1968, but Kalb argues that claim to be incorrect.) The IARE party examined a series of sedimentary layers called the Hadar Formation, which was dated to the late Pliocene to early Pleistocene epochs (3.5 to 2.3 million years ago).

=== Discovery of Lucy ===
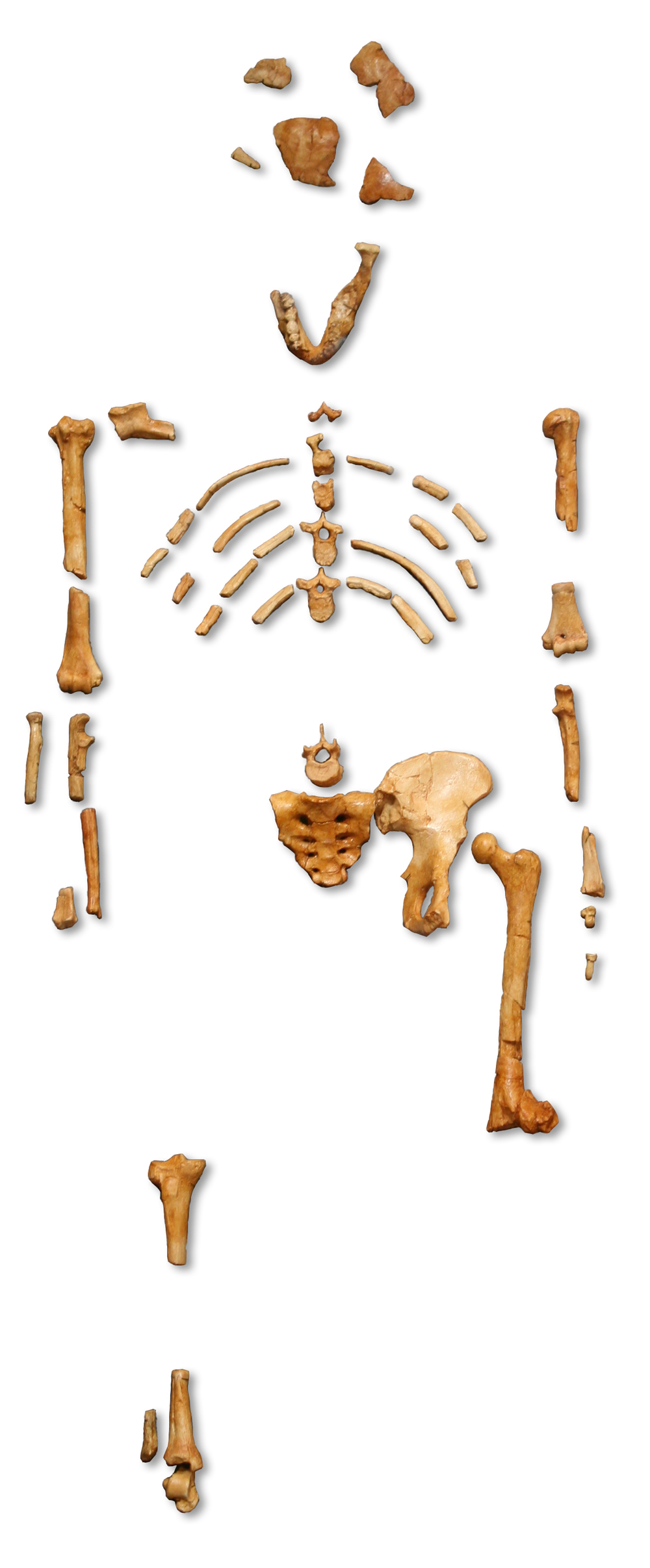
Lucy", a 3.2-million-year-old Australopithecus afarensis fossil discovered in Hadar

The anthropologist Donald Johanson, a member of the 1973 expedition to Hadar, returned the next year and discovered the fossil hominin "Lucy" in the late fall of 1974. He spotted a right proximal ulna in a gully, followed by an occipital bone, a femur, some ribs, a pelvis, and a lower jaw. Within two weeks, nearly 40% of the hominoid skeleton had been identified and cataloged. Lucy is the most famous fossil to have been found at Hadar. Lucy is among the oldest hominin fossils ever discovered and was later given the taxonomic classification Australopithecus afarensis. (The name 'Lucy' was inspired by the song "Lucy in the Sky with Diamonds" by The Beatles, which happened to be playing on the radio at base camp.)

=== Specimens and inferences ===
In 1975, Donald Johanson made another discovery at a nearby site in Hadar: 216 specimens from approximately 17 individuals, most likely related and varying in age, called AL 333 (colloquially referred to as the "First Family").

About thirty years later in nearby Dikika, another Australopithecus afarensis fossil skeleton was found in a separate outcrop of the Hadar Formation across the Awash River from Hadar. The skeleton is of a three-year-old girl later named "Selam," which means peace in Amharic Ethiopian languages.

In 1973 and 1974 when the first anatomical discoveries were made, their size and shape pointed towards a variety of taxa, but further research has confirmed that only one hominin taxon is present here. The first find there was a fossil knee joint estimated to date from 3.4 million years ago. Since then, the Hadar research area has yielded 370 specimens of A. afarensis, one specimen of Homo, and 7571 additional vertebrate specimens.

The specimens recovered display a variety of different primitive cranial post features, which indicate A. afarensis is distinct from other species of Australopithecus: small cranial capacity, palate similar to African apes (parallel tooth rows, shallow, long from front to back, narrow from side to side), primitive occipital, basal cranium anatomy, high frequency of unicuspid third premolars, prognathic face, and primitive mandibular anatomy. Postcranially, the pelvis, knee, ankle, and foot indicate habitual, terrestrial bipedalism, but ape-like curved finger and foot bones are retained ancestral ape-like features.

== Paleofauna ==
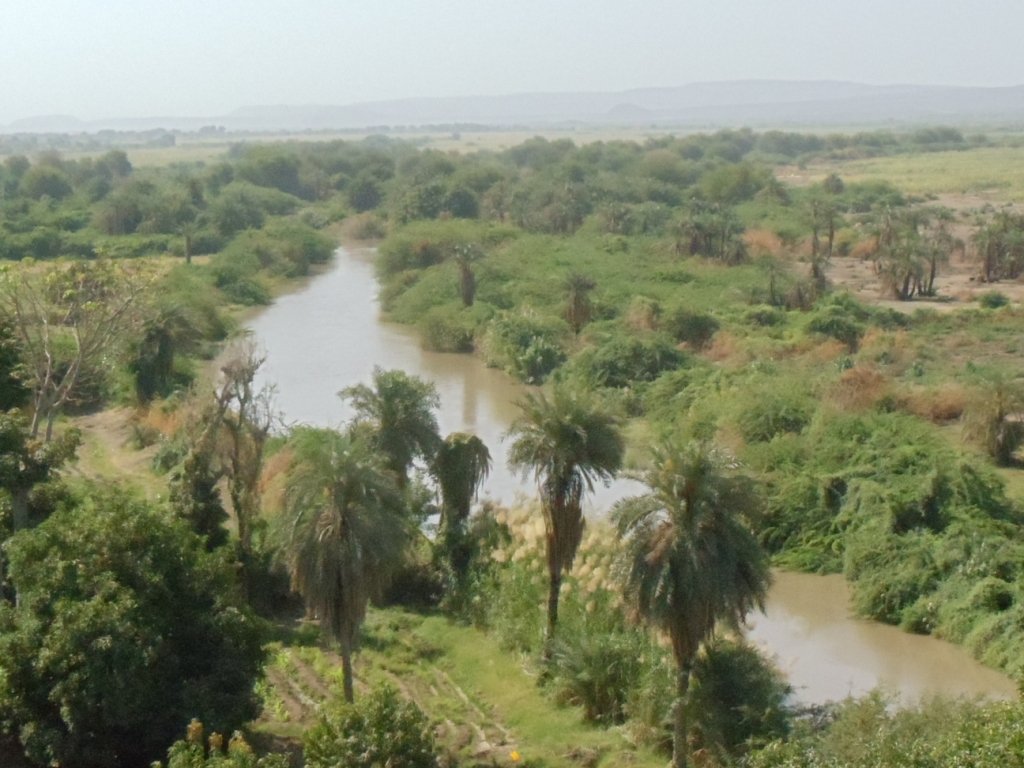
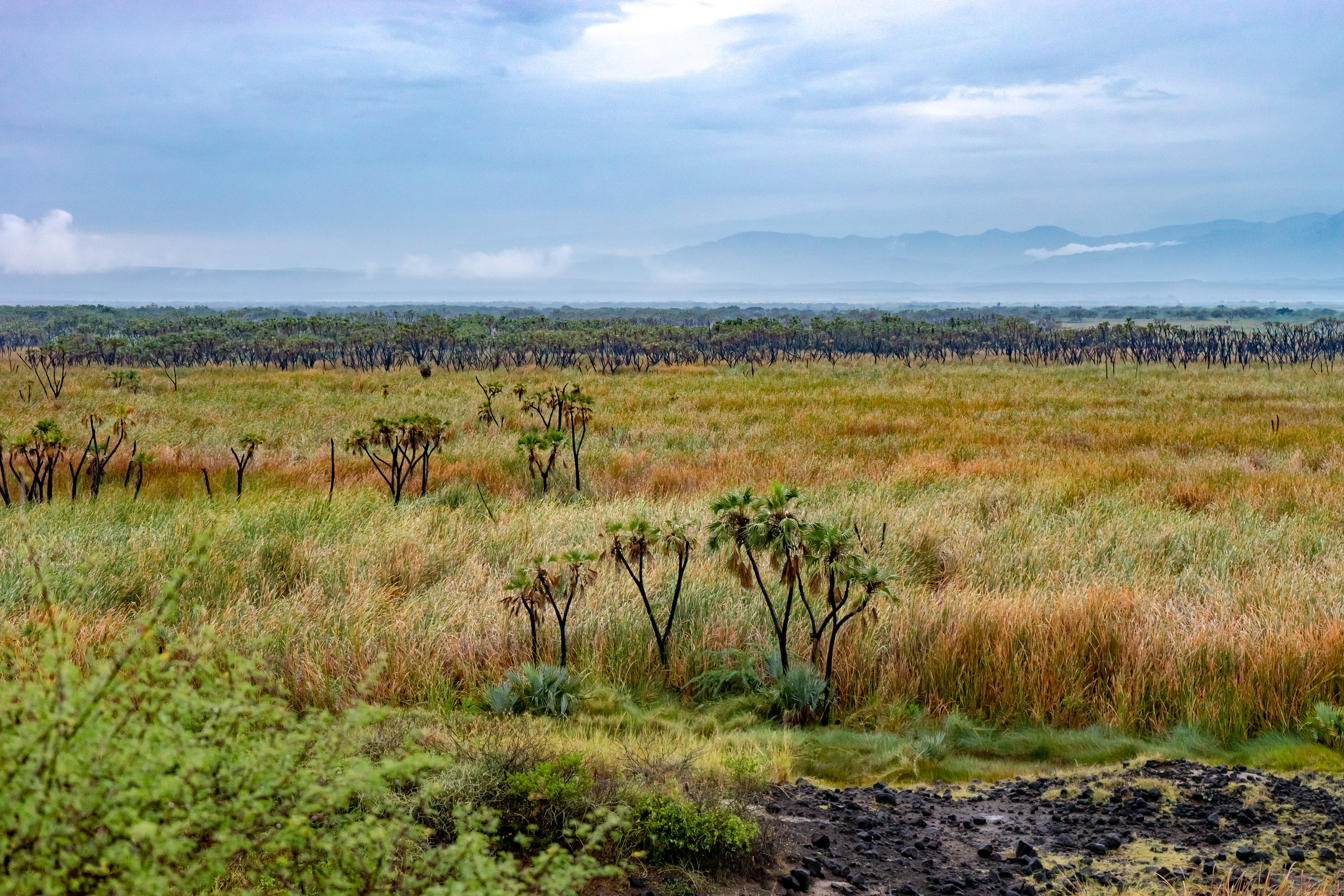
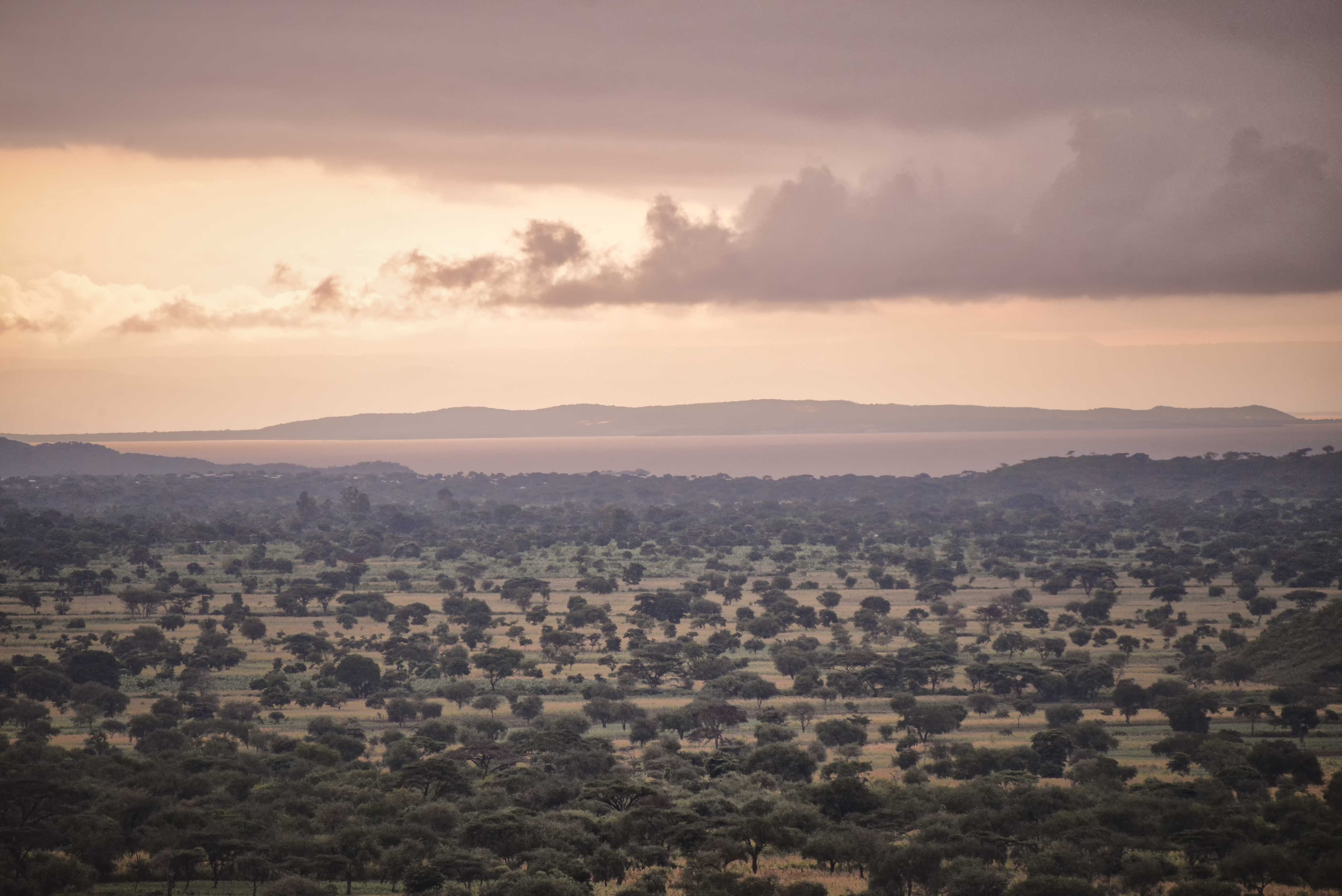
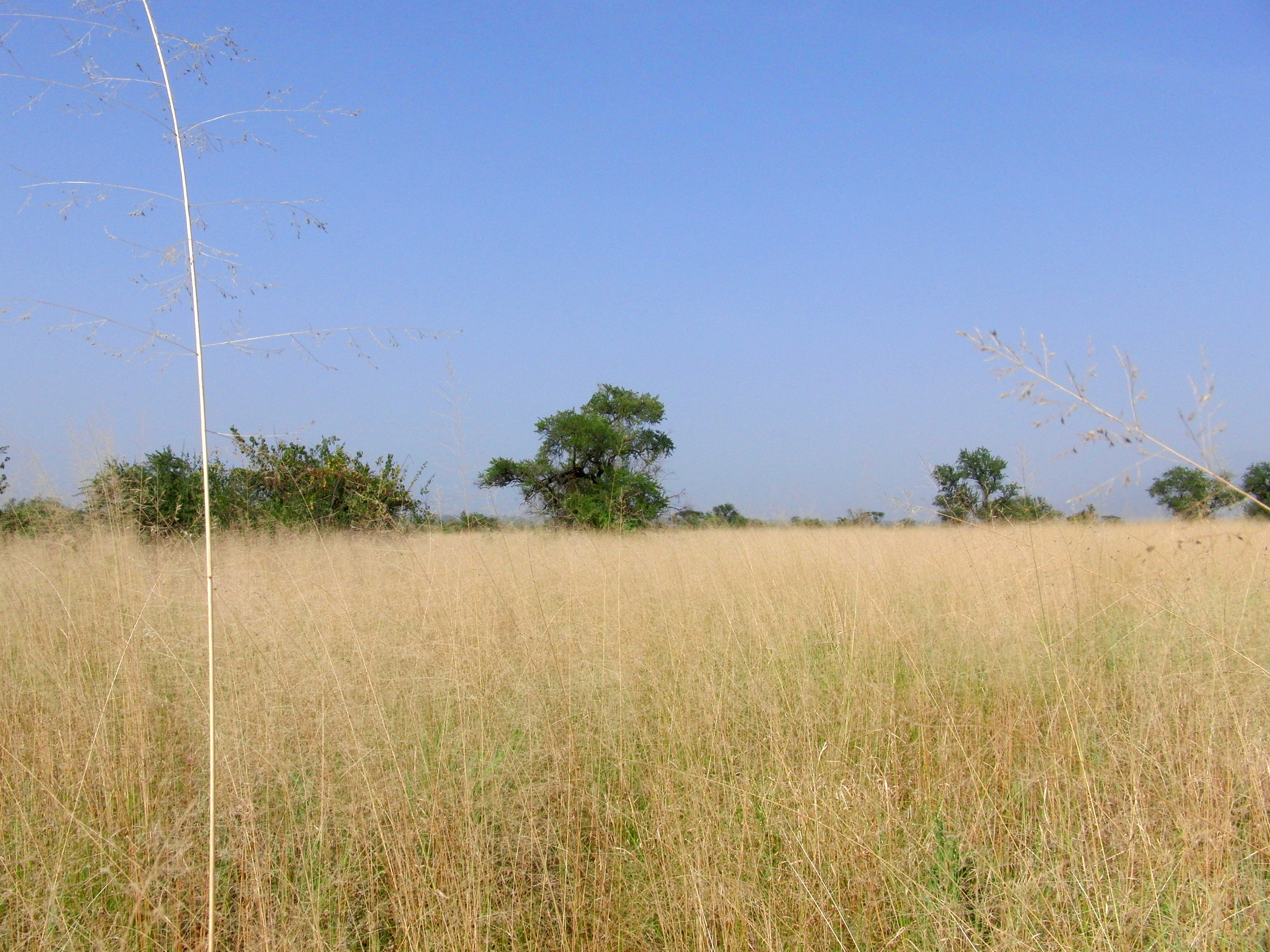
According to the geological members of Hadar, the Awash River (top) and Omo Valley (bottom) biomes might resemble the Hadar paleoenvironment.

Australopithecus specimens have been well-known for their discoveries since the 1970s. However, other specimens from the Hadar Formation contain several fossil remains of artiodactyls, perissodactyls, carnivorans, proboscideans, and other African species. The bovids found in the formation included the Aepycerotini (Aepyceros), Alcelaphini (Damalborea and Parmularius), Antilopini (Gazella), Bovini (Ugandax and Pelorovis[?]), Caprini (Budorcas), Cephalophini, Hippotragini (Oryx), Neotragini (Raphicerus[?] and Madoqua), Reduncini (Kobus), and Tragelaphini (Tragelaphus). Artiodactyls outside the bovid family were present within the formation as well, namely the giraffids (Giraffa and Sivatherium), Hippopotamidae (Hippopotamus), and suids (Kolpochoerus, Notochoerus, and Nyanzachoerus). While a definitive list of carnivorans found within the Hadar Formation has yet to be compiled, confirmed genera that were found within the Hadar Formation include canids (Canis and Nyctereutes), felids (Dinofelis, Leptailurus, Felis, Homotherium, and Panthera), hyaenids (Chasmaporthetes, Ikelohyaena, Crocuta, Hyaena, and cf. Pliocrocuta), herpestids (Herpestes and cf. Helogale), mustelids (Mellivora, Enhydriodon, and cf. Poecilogale), and the viverrid (cf. Civettictis). Mammals within the formation outside the artiodactyl and carnivoran families include a bat (indeterminate), the leporid (Lepus), the equid (Eurygnathohippus), rhinoceroses (Ceratotherium and Diceros), old world primates (Parapapio, Theropithecus, and Cercopithecoides), proboscideans (the deinothere Deinotherium and elephants Elephas, Loxodonta, and Mammuthus) old world porcupines (Hystrix and Xenohystrix), murid rodents (Gerbilliscus, Acomys, Golunda, Oenomys, Praomys, Saidomys, Millardia, and Mus), the spalacid Tachyoryctes, a squirrel indet., and an aardvark species. Taxons within other classes are present within the Hadar Formation as well, such as birds (Plectropterus, Balearica, Anhinga, and Struthio) and reptiles (Crocodylus, Python, Varanus, and Bitis).

Color key: Taxon / Reclassified taxon / Taxon falsely reported as present / Dubious taxon or junior synonym / Ichnotaxon / Ootaxon / Morphotaxon

Notes
Uncertain or tentative taxa are in small text
~~crossed out~~ taxa are discredited.

=== Mammals ===
==== Artiodactyls ====
Bovidae

Bovids of the Hadar Formation
Taxa	Species	Presence	Material	Notes	Images
Aepyceros	A. datoadeni	Kada Hadar Member at Hadar	Near-complete skull lacking parts of horn cores (AL 787-1 KH1)	An impala	
Beatragus	B. sp.		Detached braincase with two horn cores	A hirola	
Budorcas	B. churcheri	Sida Hakoma Member.	Complete skull with horns (AL 136-5 DD2)	An extinct takin	
Damalborea	D. elisabethae	Basal and Sidi Hakoma members	A skull with horn cores (AL 208-07 SH3)	An extinct genus of Alcelaphinae	
Damalborea	D. grayi	Denen Dora and Kada Hadar members	Multiple postcranial fragments, such as horn cores, maxillae, and mandibles	An extinct genus of Alcelaphinae	
Damaliscus	D. hadari	Sidi Hakoma and Kada Hadar Member		An early alcelaphine antelope	
Damalops	D. sidihakomai	Sidi Hakoma Member	AL 208–7, a skull with horn cores, right P4–M3, and left M2–3.	An extinct genus of Alcelaphinae	
Gazella	G. harmonae	Kada Hadar Member at Hadar	Skull remains, such as isolated teeth, maxillae, frontlets, and occipital bones (AL 444-16)	Extinct relatives of modern gazelles	
Gazella	G. cf. janenschi	Denen Dora Member	Horn cores (AL 302-6 DD)	Extinct relatives of modern gazelles	
Gazella	G. cf. praethomsoni	Denen Dora and Kada Hadar members	Few Horn core specimens	Extinct relatives of modern gazelles	
Kobus	K. hadarensis	Sidi Hakoma, Kada Hadar and Denen Dora member		Extinct relatives of antelopes	
Kobus	K. oricornus	Denen Dora and Kada Hadar members	Several specimens of braincase and horn core	Extinct relatives of antelopes	
Madoqua	M. sp.			Relative of dik-dik	
Parmularius	P. pachyceras	Sidi Hakoma and Kada Hadar members	Braincases and horn cores	Large extinct alcelphines related to topis and hartebeests	
Pelorovis	P. sp.				
Praedamalis	P. deturi	Kada Hadar, Sida Hakoma, and Denen Dora members at Hadar	Multiple specimens based on horn cores and lower teeth	An early Hippotragini	
Raphicerus	R. sp.	Kada Hadar and Sidi Hakoma members	Mandibles and horn cores	Relative of Neotragini	
Tragelaphus	T. lockwoodi	Basal and Sidi Hakoma members	Braincase with complete horn cores (AL 142-3 SH2)	Extinct relatives of spiral-horned antelopes	
Tragelaphus	T. rastafari	Basal, Sidi Hakoma, Denen Dora, and Kada Hadar members	Several horn core specimens	Extinct relatives of spiral-horned antelopes	
Ugandax	U. coryndonae	Denen Dora and Sidi Hakoma members at Hadar	Complete partial skull and horns (AL 194-1 DD1)	Ancestor of Cape buffalo	

Giraffidae

Giraffids of the Hadar Formation
Taxa	Species	Presence	Material	Notes	Images
Giraffa	G. jumae	Sidi Hakoma and Denen Dora members	Partial teeth, vertebrae, ossicones, limb bones, and mandibles	Extinct relatives of modern giraffe	
Giraffa	G. stillei	Sidi Hakoma and Denen Dora members	Partial teeth, ossicones, limb bones, and mandibles	Extinct relatives of modern giraffe	
Sivatherium	S. maurusium	Denen Dora, Kada Hadar, and Sidi Hakoma members	Partial mandibles and ossicones	Okapi-like giraffid	

Hippopotamidae

Hippopotamids of the Hadar Formation
Taxa	Species	Presence	Material	Notes	Images
Hexaprotodon	H. protoamphibius	Denen Dora Member	Partial skull and teeth	A Hippopotamid that is smaller than common hippos	
Hexaprotodon	H. coryndoni	Sidi Hakoma Member	Partial skull and teeth	A Hippopotamid that is smaller than common hippos	
Hippopotamus	H. afarensis	Basal, Sidi Hakoma, Kada Hadar, and Denen Dora members	Complete postcranial skull and mandibles	Extinct subspecies related to common hippopotamus, formally named Trilobophorus afarensis	

Suidae

Suids of the Hadar Formation
Taxa	Species	Presence	Material	Notes	Images
Kolpochoerus	K. afarensis	Kada Hadar, Sidi Hakoma, and Denen Dora members	Postcranial skulls, teeth fragments, and mandibles	Extinct relative of the pig family	
Notochoerus	N. eulius	Kada Hadar, Lower and Upper Sidi Hakoma, and Denen Dora members	Postcranial skull, teeth, and mandibles	A Tetraconodontinae pig	
Nyanzachoerus	N. kanamensis	Basal and Sidi Hakoma members	Complete cranium, mandibles, and dentition	A Tetraconodontinae pig	
Nyanzachoerus	N. pattersoni	Basal, Lower and Upper Sidi Hakoma, and Denen Dora members	Complete skulls, mandibles, and dentition	A Tetraconodontinae pig	

==== Carnivorans ====
Canidae

Canids of the Hadar Formation
Taxa	Species	Presence	Material	Notes	Images
Canis	C. mesomelas	Sidi Hakoma member		A black-backed jackal	
Nyctereutes	N. lockwoodi	Sidi Hakoma and Denen Dora members at Dikika	Nearly complete skull (DIK-31-1)	A raccoon dog	

Felidae

Felids of the Hadar Formation
Taxa	Species	Presence	Material	Notes	Images
Dinofelis	D. aronoki	Kada Hadar Member	Postcranial member: distal radius (AL-363-20)	A machairodontine felid	
Dinofelis	D. petteri	Sidi Hakoma and Denen Dora members	Postcranial member: partial humerus (AL 168-30), proximal ulna (AL 262-9), and right astragalus (Al 173-11)	A machairodontine felid	
Felis	F. sp.	Kada Hadar, Sidi Hakoma, and Denen Dora members		A small cat relative	
Homotherium	H. hadarensis	Denen Dora Member	Complete cranium skull, mandible fragments (DIK-96-1), teeth, and forelimbs	A scimitar-toothed cat belonging to the Machairodontinae	
Megantereon	M. sp.	Kada Hadar, Sidi Hakoma, and Denen Dora members		A machairodontine felid	
Leptailurus	L. sp.			A serval cat	
Panthera	P. sp.	Sidi Hakoma Member		Relatives of lions	

Herpestidae

Herpestids of the Hadar Formation
Taxa	Species	Presence	Material	Notes	Images
Herpestes	H. sp.	Dikika site	Tooth fragments	A mongoose	

Hyaenidae

Hyaenids of the Hadar Formation
Taxa	Species	Presence	Material	Notes	Images
Chasmaporthetes	C. sp.	Sidi Hakoma and Denen Dora members at Hadar		A hunting hyena	
Crocuta	C. dietrichi	Sidi Hakoma, Denen Dora, and Basal members at Hadar	Fragmented mandibles (DIK-32-1)	Extinct relatives of modern hyena	
Crocuta	C. eturono	Kada Hadar Member	Partial maxilla (DIK-73-1)	Extinct relatives of modern hyena	
Hyaena	H. sp.				
Ikelohyaena	I. abronia	Sidi Hakoma Member at Hadar		Early member of the Parahyaena lineage and the earliest close relative of the modern striped hyena	
Percrocuta	P. sp.				
Pliocrocuta	P. cf. perierri	Sidi Hakoma and Denen Dora members		An early hyaena relative, synonym named Pachycrocuta cf. perrieri	

Mustelidae

Mustelids of the Hadar Formation
Taxa	Species	Presence	Material	Notes	Images
Enhydriodon	E. dikikae	Basal and Sidi Hakoma members at Dikika site	Partial skull (DIK-56-9) and humerus (DIK-78-1)	A giant river otter	
Lutra	L. hearsti	Lower part of Sidi Hakoma Member at Dikika	Upper teeth fragments (DIK-50–35)	Extinct relative of otters	
Mellivora	M. sp.			A honey badger	
Poecilogale	P. sp.	Sidi Hakoma Member			

Viverridae

Viverrids of the Hadar Formation
Taxa	Species	Presence	Material	Notes	Images
Civettictis	C. sp.			A civet	

==== Perissodactyls ====
Equidae

Equids of the Hadar Formation
Taxa	Species	Presence	Material	Notes	Images
Eurygnathohippus	E. afarense	Kada Hadar Member	Partial skull (AL 363-18) and mandibles	A hipparionine horse	
Eurygnathohippus	E. hasumense	Denen Dora Member	Partial skull (AL 340-8) and mandibles	A hipparionine horse	

Rhinocerotidae

Rhinocerotids of the Hadar Formation
Taxa	Species	Presence	Material	Notes	Images
Ceratotherium	C. mauritanicum	Sidi Hakoma Member at Lower Awash of Dikika	Complete cranium skull (AL-129-25)	Ancestor of modern white rhinoceros	
Diceros	D. praecox	Sidi Hakoma Member at Lower Awash of Dikika	Incomplete cranium skull fragments and jawbones	Direct ancestor of modern black rhinoceros, formally named Ceratotherium praecox	

==== Primates ====
Cercopithecidae

Old World Monkeys of the Hadar Formation
Taxa	Species	Presence	Material	Notes	Images
Cercopithecoides	C. meaveae	Sidi Hakoma Member	Partial skeleton (A.L. 2-64 and A.L. 222-14)	A colobine monkey	
Rhinocolobus	R. turkanaensis	Sidi Hakoma and Denen Dora members	Preserved mandibles and teeth fragments	Extinct relative of colobus monkey	
Parapapio	P. cf. jonesi	Sidi Hakoma and Kada Hadar members	Complete postcranial skull, partial limbs, teeth fragments, and mandibles	A prehistoric baboon	
Theropithecus	T. oswaldi darti	Basal, Denen Dora, Kada Hadar, and Sidi Hakoma members	Postcranial skulls differentiated between male and female	Extinct relatives of gelada baboons	
Theropithecus	T. oswaldi ecki	Denen Dora Member	Female cranium skull and mandible	Extinct relatives of gelada baboons	
Theropithecus	T. oswaldi oswaldi	Sidi Hakoma and Kada Hadar members	Postcranial skulls differentiated between male and female	Extinct relatives of gelada baboons	

Hominin

Hominins of the Hadar Formation
Taxa	Species	Presence	Material	Notes	Images
Australopithecus	A. afarensis	Basal, Denen Dora, Kada Hadar, and Sidi Hakoma members	Multiple specimens consist of partial skeletons featuring small cranial capacity, primitive occipitals, basal cranium anatomy, high frequency of unicuspid third premolars, prognathic faces, and primitive mandibular anatomy.	An early australopithecine hominin	

==== Proboscideans ====
Deinotheriidae

Deinotheriids of the Hadar Formation
Taxa	Species	Presence	Material	Notes	Images
Deinotherium	D. bozasi	Denen Dora, Kada Hadar, and Sidi Hakoma members	Complete cranium skull and teeth fragments	A large extinct elephant-like proboscidean	

Elephantidae

Elephantids of the Hadar Formation
Taxa	Species	Presence	Material	Notes	Images
Elephas	E. ekorensis	Sidi Hakoma and Denen Dora members at Hadar and Dikika	Mandibles and molar fragments	Extinct lineage related to Asian elephant	
Loxodonta	L. adaurora	Denen Dora and Sidi Hakoma members at Hadar	Mandibles and molar fragments	Extinct subspecies of modern African elephant	
Loxodonta	L. exoptata	Denen Dora Member	Undescribed molars	Extinct subspecies of modern African elephant	
Mammuthus	M. sp.	Sidi Hakoma and Denen Dora Member.	Undescribed molars	A mammoth relative	
Palaeoloxodon	P. recki brumpti	Sidi Hakoma Member	Mandibles and molar fragments	An extinct relative of straight-tusked elephant	

==== Rodents ====
Rodents of the Hadar Formation
Taxa	Species	Presence	Material	Notes	Images
Acomys	A. cf. lavocati		Mandible specimens	Relatives of Spiny mice	
Acomys	A. cf. lemniscomys		Right mandible and broken tooth root	Relatives of Spiny mice	
Gerbilliscus	G. sp.		Right maxillary fragment with M2-3 and right mandible fragment with M1-3	Relative of gerbil species	
Golunda	G. gurai			Murine rodent closely related to the Indian bush rat	
Hystrix	H. cf. makapanensis	Sidi Hakoma Member		An Old World porcupine	
Mastomys	M. cf. minor		Partial skull and mandibles	Extinct relative of the multimammate mouse	
Millardia	M. coppensi			Extinct relatives of soft-furred rat	
Millardia	M. taiebi			Extinct relatives of soft-furred rat	
Mus	M. indet.			Unknown relative of Murini	
Oenomys	O. tiercelini			Extinct relative of modern rusty-nosed rat	
Pelomys	P. cf dietrichi		Mandibles	A groove-toothed swamp rat	
Praomys	P. sp.	Sidi Hakoma Member	A.L. 894-35993, a right mandible with M1-3	A Muridae species	
Saidomys	S. afarensis	Sidi Hakoma Member		Extinct relative of a muroid mouse	
Tatera	T. sp.	Sidi Hakoma and Denen Dora members		Extinct relative of the Indian gerbil	
Thallomys	T. cf. quadrilobatus		Complete skull with both mandibles	Extinct relative of the rat family endemic to Africa	
Thryonomys	T. swinderianus			A cane rat	
Xenohystrix	X. cf. crassidens	Sidi Hakoma and Denen Dora members		An old-world porcupine	
Xerus	X. sp.	Kada Hadar Member		An unstriped ground squirrel	

=== Birds ===
Birds of the Hadar Formation
Taxa	Species	Presence	Material	Notes	Images
Anhinga	A. hadarensis	Sidi Hakoma Member	A tarsometatarsus	An extinct darter	
Balearica	B. sp.				
Plectropterus	P. sp.				
Struthio	S. sp.				

=== Reptiles ===
Reptiles of the Hadar Formation
Taxa	Species	Presence	Material	Notes	Images
Bitis	B. sp.			A venomous snake	
Crocodylus	C. lucivenator	Sidi Hakoma Member	A complete cranium skull with the matching lower jaw (A.L. 138-16)	The first named crocodile species discovered from this site	
Crocodylus	C. sp.		Specimens consist of dentition	A crocodile	
Pelusios	P. awashi	Denen Dora Member	A partial cranium (A.L. 207 − 15)	An African mud terrapin, the first named turtle species discovered from this site	
Python	P. sp.			A python	
Varanus	V. sp.			A monitor lizard	

== See also ==
- Ledi-Geraru
