= Crocodylus lucivenator =

Crocodylus lucivenator Temporal range: Late Pliocene

Scientific classification
- Kingdom: Animalia
- Phylum: Chordata
- Class: Reptilia
- Order: Crocodylia
- Family: Crocodylidae
- Genus: Crocodylus
- Species: †C. lucivenator

Binomial name
- †Crocodylus lucivenator Brochu et al., 2026

Species of extinct crocodile

Crocodylus lucivenator is an extinct species of crocodile from the Late Pliocene Hadar Formation of Ethiopia. The name partially references Lucy, a specimen of Australopithecus. While there is no evidence any of the known specimens hunted Lucy specifically, as a whole the species would have likely preyed on members of the genus Australopithecus. Crocodylus lucivenator is characterized in part by the presence of a rostral boss before the eyes and appears to be closely related to paleoafrican Crocodylus species from East Africa rather than the crocodiles that inhabit the continent today.

== History and naming ==
All fossil remains of Crocodylus lucivenator come from the Hadar Formation, a Late Pliocene geological formation located in Afar Regional State, north-east Ethiopia. The Hadar Formation itself has been separated into four members,from oldest to youngest the Basal, Sidi Hakoma, Denen Dora and Kada Hadar Members. The holotype of Crocodylus lucivenator is specimen A.L. 138-16, a complete cranium with the matching lower jaw and the most complete specimen known. The holotype specifically comes from the SH-1 submember of the Sidi Hakoma Member, however Christopher Brochu and colleagues also referred an enormous number of other fossil remains to the species spanning all the way to the Kada Hadar Member and covering the intermediate Denen Dora Member as well. The referred material includes a number of well preserved skulls along with isolated cranial and postcranial remains, teeth and osteoderms. In the 2026 description, Brochu and colleagues argue that there is no evidence for any other readily distinguishable crocodylian species from the sediments, unlike Pliocene fossil localities of the Turkana Basin in Kenya, which preserve more than one.

The species name "lucivenator" derives from the Latin words "luci" and "venator" meaning "light" and "hunter" respectively. The first part of the name also has a second meaning, as it simultaneously alludes to Lucy, a famous specimen of the early hominid Australopithecus afarensis also known from the Hadar Formation. While there is no direct link between Lucy and any specimen of Crocodylus lucivenator, Brochu and colleagues reason that the crocodiles would definitely have preyed on members of her species.

== Description ==
The external naris opens anterodorsally, meaning that the structure doesn't simply face upward but is furthermore angled towards the front of the snout. A possibly significant, although variable feature of Crocodylus lucivenator concerns the presence of a prenarial rostrum, or simply the fact that the snout stretches notably in front of the opening of the external naris. A perinarial rostrum is present in all three groups of modern Crocodylus species; the Neoafrican, Neotropical and Indopacific Crocodylus; and in these forms usually extends beyond the front margin of the naris by at least half the length of the opening. While not as extensive as in these extant forms, the prenarial rostrum of Crocodylus lucivenator is nonetheless clearly developed in some specimens including the holotype. Species of Palaeoafrican Crocodylus meanwhile have been traditionally regarded as lacking a pronounced perinarial rostrum, in their case the narial opening is located very close to the very tip of the snout. There are however certain specimens of Crocodylus lucivenator that show a prenarial rostrum that is much closer in its extent to typical Palaeoafrican forms like Crocodylus thorbjarnarsoni (in particular those from Koobi Fora) and Crocodylus anthropophagus as well. The matter is further complicated by the fact that the variable presence of a distinct but short prenarial rostrum has also been found in Crocodylus sudani, the Lothagam "checchiai" (an unnamed species once mistakenly attributed to Crocodylus checchiai) and C. thorbjarnarsoni specimens from the Omo River Valley. Ultimately Brochu and colleagues regard the anatomy of the prenarial rostrum in C. lucivenator to be variable but generally more similar to the condition seen in modern crocodiles.

The premaxilla is elevated around the rim of the naris and a similar elevation can also be seen where the bone comes into contact with the maxilla. The extent of the dorsal premaxillary processes, which is the part of the premaxillae that extend backwards between the maxilla and nasal bone, appears to differ between specimens. In at least some specimens they are described as long and slender, reaching the alveolus for the third or maybe even fourth maxillary tooth. The transition from premaxilla to maxilla along the outer surface of the rostrum is marked by a distinct notch as in other true crocodiles, which serves to receive an enlarged tooth of the lower jaw. Behind the premaxilla the rostrum is formed laterally by the maxillae and medially by the paired nasals, but unlike in Crocodylus anthropophagus there is no crest spanning the contact between the two. Towards the back of its extent the maxilla forms a large convex projection into the lacrimal bone and eventually tapers into a narrow process where it contacts the jugal. The nasals meanwhile stretch from the narial opening, where they form a small process that projects into the naris, towards just before the eyes. They initially expand, maintain a fairly consistent width between the maxillae and then taper again between the lacrimals and prefrontal bones. Finally the nasals are bifurcated by the anterior-most process of the frontal bone.

A significant feature of Crocodylus lucivenator is the presence of a so-called rostral boss, an expanded structure of the skull that stretches along the dorsal surface of the skull just before the eyes. In the case of Crocodylus lucivenator this boss is described as being modestly developed, which sets it apart from the much more prominent bosses seen in the Lothagam "checchiai" as well as Crocodylus checchiai and modern Neotropical species. The more modest height of the main rostral boss is also highlighted when comparing it to some of the other knobs and structures that adorn the snout of Crocodylus lucivenator. Brochu and colleagues describe two additional bosses along the upper surface of each maxilla, one located just above the fifth maxillary teeth and a second smaller knob behind this one. Importantly, the second, more posterior knob is described as actually being more pronounced than the midrostral boss. However, Crocodylus lucivenator lacks the maxillo-nasal crest and the prefrontal knobs that characterize Crocodylus anthropophagus.

The anterior border of the eyesockets is formed by the lacrimal and the prefrontal bones. The former bear a small foramen for the lacrimal duct and both form tuberosities, one located at the contact between the two bones and the maxilla and additional kobs found on the anteromedial orbital margin formed by the prefrontal. The frontal stretches from the endpoint of the nasals to the skull table, forming the more prominently upturned medial margin of the orbits in the process. The precise anatomy of the frontal-nasal contact varies between specimens. In the holotype its a simple pointed process that splits the nasals, but in one referred specimen the suture is more complex, with each nasal in turn sending a process into the anterior frontal.

The skull table is trapezoidal in shape and formed mostly by the main body of the frontal, the parietal bone, the postorbitals and the squamosals. The postorbitals connect to either side of the frontal to form the anterior corners of the structure and contribute to the elevated rim of the eyesocket, however there is a notable interruption in this rim behind the contact of the two bones. The moderately upturned dorsal surface of each postorbital is briefly interrupted by a notch near the contact with the squamosals, which continue on to form a pair pronounced squamosal horns, which are most pronounced in the largest specimens. The parietal broadly contacts both the frontal and squamosals, but only has a short contact with the postorbitals along the outer edges of the supratemporal fenestrae. It's hourglass-shaped, contacts the parietal along a V-shaped suture close to the anterior edge of the skull openings and partially surrounds a small dorsally exposed part of the supraoccipital, visible only as a small triangular expression. Other than this, the parietal and the squamosals form most of the posterior edge of the skull table, which bulges outwards.

On the side of the skull lie the lateral skull table groove, the infratemporal fenestra and the postorbital bar, which separates the infratemporal fenestra from the eyesockets. The postorbital overhangs the lateral skull table groove, which bears numerous foramina. The postorbital bar is deeply inset and formed by the columnar descending process of the postorbital and the ascending process of the jugal. On the lateral surface the skull the squamosal extends beneath the postorbital, ultimately ending just above the postorbital bar, and houses the lateral squamosal groove, a deeply inset structure that forms a lobe that projects into the otic aperture. The squamosal forms both the dorsal surface of the otic recess and the posterodorsal edge of the otic aperture. It also forms the dorsal-most part of the infratemporal fenestra, though much of the posterodorsal edge is actually formed by the quadratojugal, which like in other Palaeoafrican Crocodylus species almost extends to the uppermost point of the opening.

The incisive foramen is described as circular with a modest notch in its posterior margin and there are two deep pits for the reception of the first dentary teeth anterolateral to this opening. On the palatal surface the contact between the premaxillae and maxillae forms a distinct W-shape. The maxillary ramus of the ectopterygoid is not forked. The bar that separates the suborbital fenestrae, which is formed by a combination of the palatines and the pterygoids, expands outward towards the back of the skull.

=== Dentition ===
With five premaxillary teeth, 13 to 14 maxillary teeth and 15 to 16 teeth in the lower jaw, the tooth count of Crocodylus lucivenator matches that of its closest relatives. The largest premaxillary teeth was the fourth while the largest maxillary teeth were the fifth and tenth.

The teeth of Crocodylus lucivenator display the classic interlocking pattern expected of the group. The first dentary tooth would have slid into a deep notch present in the palatal surface of the premaxilla and some specimens show that with age the tooth may have even broken through the dorsal surface, leaving the tip exposed even when the jaws were shut. While the reception pits for the first dentary teeth are located lingual to the premaxillary tooth row, subsequent teeth were actually interlocking with the teeth of the upper jaw as evidenced by deep pits located between the third to fifth alveoli. Behind the premaxillary teeth sits a large open notch which receives the enlarged fourth dentary tooth when the jaws are closed, creating a distinct separation between the premaxillary and maxillary teeth. The maxillary teeth are similarly separated by deep occlusal pits as the premaxillary teeth, with the ones between the sixth to eight especially pronounced but none being present between the final four tooth positions.

=== Osteoderms ===
Several isolated osteoderms from the Hadar Formation have also been attributed to Crocodylus lucivenator and vary in overall shape, likely in accordance with their position on the body. Several are circular or D-shaped and likely were part of the nuchal shield atop the neck or covered the flanks. Others are wider than long and were likely part of the main dorsal armor covering the back. These rectangular osteoderms also show sutural surfaces on both the lateral and medial sides where they would have connected to their surrounding osteoderms. However they had only poorly developed or even no anterior imbricating zones at all, structures associated with the overlapping of the osteoderm rows. The surface of the osteoderms was covered in pits and featured a single crest, though one particular specimen is unique from the other Hadar Formation material in having a much more curved rather than straight crest.

=== Size ===
The largest specimens of Crocodylus lucivenator reached a length between 4–5 m (13–16 ft) and likely reached a weight between 300–600 kg (660–1,320 lb).

== Phylogeny ==
The phylogenetic analysis that accompanied the type description of Crocodylus lucivenator was based on morphological data and included well established species along with Crocodylus lucivenator This included fossil material from Lothagam previously assigned to the species Crocodylus checchiai, an assignment disputed by Brochu and colleagues, as well as fossil material from Kanapoi that had previously been attributed to Crocodylus thorbjarnarsoni. The resulting trees were largely in agreement with prior studies that recovered a distinct monophyletic clade of Crocodylus species commonly referred to as Palaeoafrican Crocodylus that is only distantly related to the crocodiles that inhabit Africa today, referred to as the Neoafrican Crocodylus, composed of the extant Nile and Sacred crocodile. The Palaeoafrican clade meanwhile was found to be composed of Crocodylus thorbjarnarsoni and Crocodylus anthropophagus, the two earliest-recognized members of the group, Crocodylus lucivenator and both the Kanapoi Crocodylus as well as the Lothagam "checchiai". Within the clade both C. anthropophagus and C. thorbjarnarsoni were recovered as each other's closets relatives while the other species form a large polytomy with this grouping in the strict consensus tree. The Adam's consensus of the optimal tree provides a slightly better resolved Palaeoafrican clade, with Crocodylus lucivenator and the Kanapoi species as potential close relatives based on the shape of the lacrimal-maxilla contact. However, while the shape of this contact is clearly different in the Lothagam "checchiai", its shape is unknown in the other two Palaeoafrican Crocodylus species and present across both modern Neoafrican and Neotropic Crocodylus species, meaning that the shared condition in the Kanapoi form and Crocodylus lucivenator may not mean anything. More broadly, the strict consensus recovered the Palaeoafrican clade and by extension Crocodylus lucivenator in a basal position relative to extant members of the genus, having branched off before the Indopacific clade as well as the split between Neoafrican Crocodylus and the clade formed by Neotropic taxa and Crocodylus checchiai proper.

Brochu and colleagues note some differences with other phylogenetic analyses of crocodylids. Some alternative results are also possible, as it would only take one additional step for the Palaeoafrican group to clade with modern Neotropic Crocodylus due to the shared presence of a rostral boss.

- - Crocodylus
    - Palaeoafrican Crocodylus
      - † Lothagam "checchiai"
      - - † Crocodylus anthropophagus
        - † Crocodylus thorbjarnarsoni
      - † Kanapoi Crocodylus
      - † Crocodylus lucivenator
    - - † Crocodylus palaeindicus
      - - Mugger crocodile (Crocodylus palustris)
        - - - Siamese crocodile (Crocodylus siamensis)
            - † Crocodylus ossifragus
          - - - New Guinea crocodile (Crocodylus novaguineae)
              - Borneo crocodile (Crocodylus raninus)
            - Philippine crocodile (Crocodylus mindorensis)
            - Freshwater crocodile (Crocodylus johnstoni)
            - Saltwater crocodile (Crocodylus porosus)
      - - Nile crocodile (Crocodylus niloticus)
        - Sacred crocodile (Crocodylus suchus)
        - - † Crocodylus checchiai
          - American crocodile (Crocodylus acutus)
          - Morelet's crocodile (Crocodylus moreletii)
          - Cuban crocodile (Crocodylus rhombifer)
          - Orinoco crocodile (Crocodylus intermedius)

== Paleobiology ==
=== Intraspecific combat ===
Specimen A.L. 126-11 of Crocodylus lucivenator preserves several lesions along the dentary including five furrows and a putative puncture wound, the texture within and surrounding these injuries is described as irregular and spongy, suggesting that the animal not only survived the encounter but that bone had already undergone significant healing by the time the animal died. Even without the advanced healing, the traces suggest that the initial injury pierced the cortical bone and was left by the crushing bite of an animal with conical teeth that left their marks with a single bite. This combination of traits excludes the possibility that the wound was inflicted by a mammals and instead suggests that the animal was injured by another crocodile.

The furrows visible on the dentary of specimen A.L. 126-11 are described as hooked and "J"- or "V"-shaped, indicating that the tooth that left the mark rapidly changed its trajectory during the attack. Such a pattern is typical for animals that utilize inertia when feeding, which in the case of crocodiles include maneuvers such as the death roll, thrashing of the head and the quick release and seizure of prey with the jaws. Modern crocodiles are well known for fighting among each other over access to prey, territory or mates, most commonly leaving injuries to the head, limbs and base of the tail. Given their nische and size, it was likely that the biggest threat to individual Crocodylus lucivenator were other members of the same species.

=== Paleoecology ===
Given the size and robust skull-build, Crocodylus lucivenator is interpreted to have been a macro-generalist ambush predator, likely the apex of its native environment. The Hadar Formation is described as preserving a mixed environment of woodlands and grasslands with large palaeolakes present during some points in time. Crocodylus lucivenator was present throughout three of the formations four members, the Sidi Hakoma, Denen Dora and Kada Hadar Members. Among these the oldest, the Sidi Hakoma Member, was the wettest and most heavily wooded, while the younger members were deposited under increasingly drier conditions. The formation also preserves the fossil remains of the early hominine Australopithecus afarensis, which would have likely fallen prey to the crocodiles.

The fact that Crocodylus lucivenator appears to have been the only crocodile native to the Hadar Formation stands in stark contrast to other contemporary regions of Africa, among the most notable being the Lake Turkana basin of Kenya, which suggests the presence of three, possibly four different crocodilians. The more specious deposits of the Late Pliocene and Early Pleistocene feature diverse assemblages that often include combinations of Palaeoafrican Crocodylus species, the large piscovore Euthecodon and species similar to modern Mecistops, sometimes even all three. In the case of the Nachukui Formation the fauna may perhaps even include a type of gharial.

Several lines of thinking may explain this discrepancy between Hadar and Lake Turkana, though many of these are considered by Brochu and colleagues to have weaknesses. Sampling bias is thought unlikely because the Afar region, though smaller than the Lake Turkana basin, has been researched equally intensively. Like sampling, temperature differences are also regarded as a negligible factor by Brochu and colleagues, as even during the gradual cooling after the Middle Miocene Climatic Optimum crocodiles persisted in the region inhabited by C. lucivenator to this day. Precipitation and aridity, on the other hand, may have only differed slightly between the two regions, as they both featured mixed woodlands and grasslands with rivers and lakes. The team also notes that modern Africa tends to be less taxonomically diverse as well, with co-occurrences of multiple forms mostly limited to western Africa and featuring taxa noticeably smaller than their potential ecological equivalents from the Pleistocene.
