= Erella Hovers =

Israeli paleoanthropologist

Erella Hovers (Hebrew: אראלה חוברס; born 1956) is an Israeli paleoanthropologist. She is currently a professor at The Hebrew University of Jerusalem, working within the Institute of Archeology. The majority of her field work is centered in the Horn of Africa, with a primary focus on Ein Qashish, Israel and Eastern Ethiopia. Her research concentrates on the development of the use of symbolism during the Levantine Middle Palaeolithic and Middle Stone Age. Other research interests include lithic technology, taphonomy, and general behavior of early hominids.

== Early life and education ==
Hovers was born in Haifa, to parents who immigrated to Israel from eastern Europe after the Holocaust. In 1979, Hovers received her B.A. in Archaeology and Geography at The Hebrew University. In 1988, she obtained her M.A. in Prehistoric Archaeology, also from The Hebrew University, graduating Cum Laude. In 1998, she received her PhD from the Hebrew University, Summa Cum Laude. From 1998 until 1999, Hovers was a post-doctoral fellow at Harvard University.

== Discoveries in research ==
Erella Hovers has significantly furthered general knowledge on the behaviors and actions of hominids such as early Homo sapiens and Homo neanderthalensis.

In 2001, Hovers found evidence that Neanderthals located in Israel were able to exploit the fauna around them for their own benefit. According to Hovers' article "The Exploitation of Plant Resources by Neanderthals in Amud Cave (Israel): The Evidence from Phytolith Studies," by measuring Phytolith preservation in the sediments of the Amud Cave, it was determined that Neanderthals used wood to build and fuel fires, while herbaceous plants were used for both bedding and food. Hovers uses this study to dispute the previously held notion that the subsistence and mobility of pre-modern hunter-gatherers was primarily dependent on animal migrations. Instead, she proposes that it was due to the spatio-temporal distribution of particular fauna.

Hovers’ research also significantly furthered the scientific community's understanding of modern human behavior in early hominids. In her 2006 article, "’Now You See it, Now You Don't’ -Modern Human Behavior in the Middle Paleolithic”, Hovers suggests that the reason that modern human behavior is only rarely seen in the Middle Paleolithic hominid fossil record is not because the hominids were unintelligent or had a minimal brain capacity. Rather, she proposes the idea that such examples of modern behavior simply go unrecognized. This is because only a small portion of their activities were progressive in nature, meaning that they do not lead from a particular situation to a particular goal. Furthermore, because the twenty-first century ideals of innovativeness differ significantly from that of early hominids, many people simply cannot recognize what would have been considered “innovative”.

In 2016, Hovers' work drew renewed attention to a previous theory that the Levantine corridor was the primary land route used by early hominins to migrate out from Africa into Eurasia. Through her discovery of Nubian Levallois cores in the Negev highlands of Israel, Hovers found evidence that early hominins had, at one point, migrated through that region. This in turn indicates the route by which human dispersal took place.

In 2017, Hovers led the discovery of the remains of two Neanderthals, along with a set of stone tools and some animal bones, from the Middle Paleolithic open-air site of Ein Qashish in northern Israel. Because these findings, the scientific community was able to tie material culture remains of neanderthals to an open-air site, where previously they had been solely associated with cave sites. This discovery proved the versatility of neanderthals, and shows that they were not merely simple hominids confined to caves. Instead, they could adapt somewhat to their environment.

In addition to being a professor in the department of prehistoric archeology in the Institute of Archeology at The Hebrew University of Jerusalem, Hovers is also an International Research Affiliate for Arizona State University with a concentration in Plio-Pleistocene archaeology in East Africa. She also serves as Field School Faculty in Hadar for Arizona State University

== Publications ==
- An Early Case of Color Symbolism: Ochre Use by Modern Humans in Qafzeh Cave, 2003
- Transitions before the transition : evolution and stability in the Middle Paleolithic and Middle Stone Age, 2005
- Transitions Before the Transition Evolution and Stability in the Middle Paleolithic and Middle Stone Age, 2006
- Ein Qashish : a new Middle Paleolithic open-air site in northern Israel, 2008
- The lithic assemblages of Qafzeh Cave, 2009
