= Damalborea =

Damalborea Temporal range: Middle Pliocene

Scientific classification
- Domain: Eukaryota
- Kingdom: Animalia
- Phylum: Chordata
- Class: Mammalia
- Order: Artiodactyla
- Family: Bovidae
- Subfamily: Alcelaphinae
- Genus: †Damalborea; Gentry, 2010

Type species
- †Damalborea elisabethae Gentry, 2010

Extinct genus of mammals

Damalborea is an extinct genus of alcelaphine bovid. It was first named by Alan W. Gentry in 2010, and the type species is Damalborea elisabethae. It is known from the holotype AL 208–7, a skull with horn cores collected from the Middle Pliocene (ca. 3.3 mya) Hadar Formation Member SH-3 of Ethiopia. In addition, a fossils of this or a closely related species were collected from Aramis, Wee-ee and Maka localities in the Middle Awash deposits, lower and upper units of the Laetolil Beds, as well as Tulu Bor Member and an unknown horizon of the Koobi Fora Formation. Geraads, Bobe & Reed (2012) assigned all Damalborea specimens from the Basal Member and Sidi Hakoma member of the Hadar Formation to the species D. elisabethae; in addition, the authors named the second species, Damalborea grayi, described on the basis of fossils from the Denen Dora member of the Hadar Formation. Damalborea was a moderately large alcelaphine (larger than Damalacra and Parmularius) with high and narrow skull proportions.

According to Gentry (2010), the generic name "indicates an alcelaphine of the north" (differentiating it from Damalacra, the fossils of which were discovered near the Cape of Good Hope), while the specific name of the type species honors Elisabeth Vrba. The specific name of the second species honors Brett Thomas Gray, a major participant in the International Afar Research Expedition.
