= Dikika =

Area of the Afar Region of Ethiopia

Coordinates: 11.0833°N 40.5833°E

The Dikika is an area of the Afar Region of Ethiopia. A hominin fossil named Selam, a specimen of the Australopithecus afarensis species, was found in this area. Papers also propose the earliest evidence of stone tool use at this site in the form of cut marks on animal bone. However there has been argument about this proposal. Dikika is located in Mille woreda.

Dikika is also given to name a basal member of the Hadar formation, a series of sedimentary rocks deposited approximately 3.4 million years ago, which have been exposed by the erosive action of the Awash River. Although sometimes called "Lucy's Child" Dikika was in fact older than Lucy or Dinkʼinesh at 3.4 million years.
