= Crocuta dietrichi =

Crocuta dietrichi Temporal range: Pliocene to Pleistocene

Scientific classification
- Kingdom: Animalia
- Phylum: Chordata
- Class: Mammalia
- Infraclass: Placentalia
- Order: Carnivora
- Family: Hyaenidae
- Genus: Crocuta
- Species: †C. dietrichi

Binomial name
- †Crocuta dietrichi Petter & Howell, 1989

Synonyms
- Crocuta dbaa? (Geraads, 1997)

Extinct species

Crocuta dietrichi is an extinct species of hyena closely related to the modern spotted hyena. It lived through the Plio-Pleistocene, and has been reported from as early as 4.4 million years ago to as recently as 1.7 million years ago. It has been found in southern, eastern, and possibly northern Africa. During the Pliocene Crocuta dietrichi coexisted with the larger Crocuta eturono in eastern Africa, where niche partitioning had likely occurred between the two species, with Crocuta dietrichi acting as an opportunistic predator and scavenger while Crocuta eturono was a more specialized predator of large prey. Crocuta dietrichi is the earliest known member of the genus Crocuta.

== Characteristics ==
Crocuta dietrichi was slightly smaller than the spotted hyena but was otherwise morphologically very similar to the modern species. Crocuta dietrichi was smaller than most Crocuta. Relative to other members of its genus Crocuta dietrichi had a longer talonid on its first premolar, a shorter third premolar, and a wider fourth premolar.
