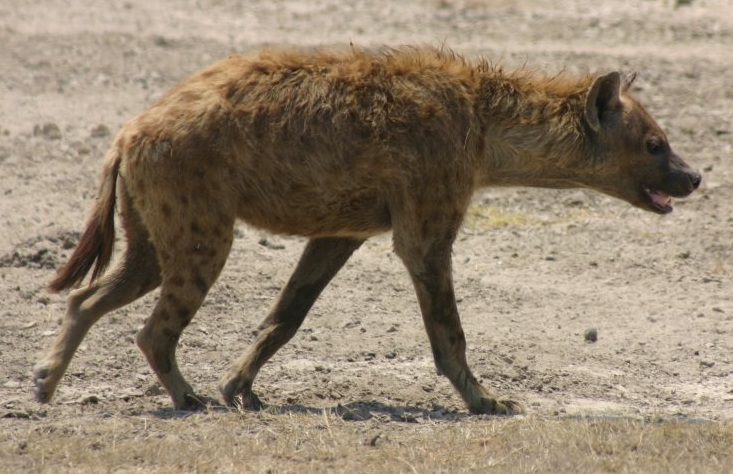
- Spotted hyena (Crocuta crocuta)

Scientific classification
- Kingdom: Animalia
- Phylum: Chordata
- Class: Mammalia
- Order: Carnivora
- Family: Hyaenidae
- Subfamily: Hyaeninae
- Genus: Crocuta; Kaup, 1828

Type species
- Hyaena crocuta Erxleben, 1777

Species
- Crocuta crocuta; †Crocuta dietrichi; †Crocuta eturono; †Crocuta honanensis; †Crocuta spelaea?; †Crocuta ultima?; †Crocuta ultra; †Crocuta venustula

= Crocuta =

Crocuta Temporal range: 3.8–0 Ma Pliocene - Present

Genus of mammals

Crocuta is a genus of hyena containing the largest extant member of the family, the spotted hyena (Crocuta crocuta). Several fossil species are also known, with the Pleistocene Eurasian cave hyenas either being regarded as distinct species or subspecies of the spotted hyena.

== Taxonomy and evolution ==
It is still unclear whether the genus evolved in Africa or Asia, although the oldest known fossils are from Africa and dated to about 3.8 mya. The earliest remains from Asia currently attributed to the genus is Crocuta honanensis from the Early Pleistocene of China dating to around 2.5-2.2 million years ago, but its relationship to the living spotted hyena is ambiguous. Crocuta first appears in Europe around 800,000 years ago at the beginning of the Middle Pleistocene, replacing the giant hyena Pachycrocuta.

The Eurasian "cave hyenas" (Crocuta spelaea, Crocuta ultima and others) have either been considered subspecies of the living spotted hyena, or as distinct species. Genetic analysis of cave hyenas have found them to be strongly genetically divergent from living African spotted hyenas, albeit with some evidence of limited interbreeding between the two populations.

Two extinct species are known to have coexisted with each other in eastern Africa during the Pliocene; Crocuta eturono and Crocuta dietrichi, each one probably occupying a different niche in regards to their preference for scavenging or hunting. In Ahl al Oughlam, a Pliocene site in Morocco, lived the species Crocuta dbaa. In China there was a Pliocene species, Crocuta honanensis, The holotype of Crocuta sivalensis from the Indian subcontinent has been determined to be a specimen of Pliocrocuta and unrelated to Crocuta proper and thus this species is invalid, though Crocuta proper is indeed recognised from the Early Pleistocene Swalik Hills of the northern Indian subcontinent.

A 2022 review of the genus recognised 7 extinct species in addition to living spotted hyena, with African species including C.eturono in the late Pliocene, C. venustula in the Pliocene and Early Pleistocene (with the authors regarding C. dietrichi and C. dbaa as synonyms of this species), and C. ultra in the Early-Middle Pleistocene, with two species, C. honanensis (Early Pleistocene of China and the Indian continent) and C. ultima (Middle-Late Pleistocene) recognised in Asia, and C. intermedia (Middle Pleistocene) and C. spelaea (Middle-Late Pleistocene) recognised in Europe.
