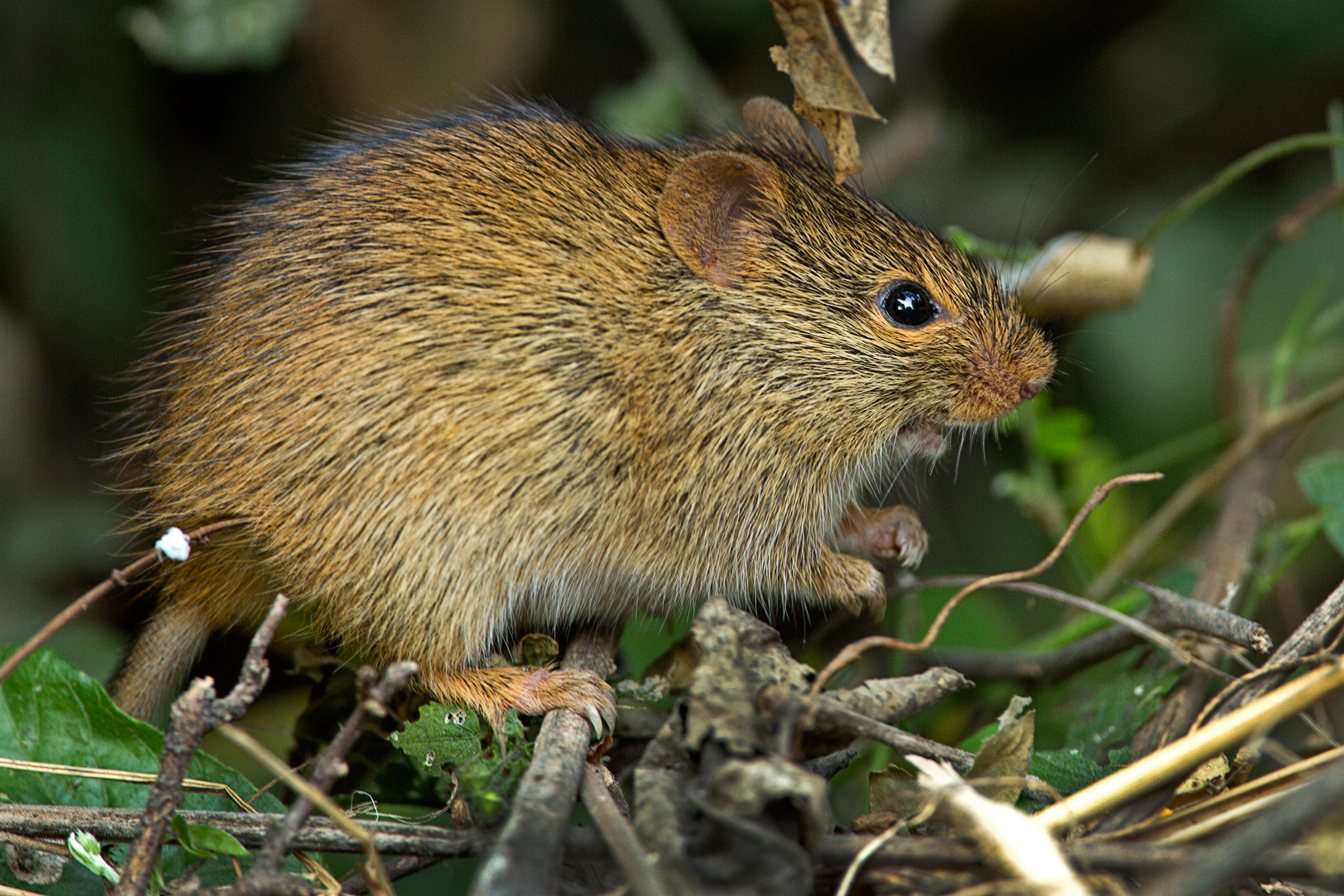
- At Keoladeo National Park, Bharatpur, India

Conservation status
- Least Concern (IUCN 3.1)

Scientific classification
- Kingdom: Animalia
- Phylum: Chordata
- Class: Mammalia
- Order: Rodentia
- Family: Muridae
- Genus: Golunda
- Species: G. ellioti

Binomial name
- Golunda ellioti Gray, 1837

= Indian bush rat =

Species of rodent

The Indian bush rat (Golunda ellioti) is a rodent species in the family Muridae. It is the only extant member of the genus Golunda, and is the only extant member of the tribe Arvicanthini found outside of Africa.

The species is widely distributed in the Indian subcontinent west to Kohat and east to Guwahati. It also occurs in Sri Lanka. In addition, an isolated population exists in southeastern Iran. As many as 11 subspecies were initially recognized, though a reclassification of specimens collected from the Indian subcontinent recognized three subspecies.

The genus name is derived from the Kannada name of Gulandi while the specific name is after Sir Walter Elliot. The nominate form is from southern India. Other forms include limitaris (northwestern limits), paupera (Punjab), watsoni (Sind), gujerati (Gujarat), bombax (Bombay), coraginis (Coorg), coffaeus (Sri Lanka), newera (Sri Lanka), myiothrix (Nepal) and coenosa (Bhutan Duars, Hasimara).

== Description ==
Head and body length is 12–14 cm. Tail is 9–11. Yellowish brown upper parts are speckled with black and reddish yellow. Ventral surface grayish with a yellowish speckle. Fur texture varies with age, altitude and season. Fur was short, crisp and spiny during summer, and long and soft in winter, and individuals of higher altitudes have softer fur relative to those in the plains. Juvenile and younger individuals are darker than older ones, fur is darker during the winter than in summer, but individuals in molt appear dark or blackish due to the exposure of the slaty underfur. Orange-yellow incisor teeth. Tail, dark above and yellowish below. Body fur spiny. Rounded head with a blunt nose, with small eyes mark. Relatively short bill. Eleven "forms" or subspecies were initially recognized, namely G. e. bombax, G. e. coenosus, G. e. cqffaeus, G. e. coraginis, G. e. ellioti, G. e. gujerati, G. e. limitaris, G. e. myothrix, G. e. netvera, G. e. paiipera, and G. e. tvatsoni. Subsequent to this initial classification, pelage characteristics and distributions were carefully assessed in museum collections of specimens collected in the Indian subcontinent and the following three recognizable subspecies were listed:

G. elliotii elliotii, characterized by grayish brown dorsum and grayish under surface and is found throughout India (except Rajasthan and Gujarat), Pakistan and Sri Lanka;

G. elliotii gujerati, characterized by whitish under surface, longer tail and relatively shorter ear, and found largely in southern Rajasthan and Gujarat though has also been seen in Maharashtra;

G. elliotii nuwara, recognized by blackish dorsum, bluish-grey venter, and relatively shorter tail, found only in the mountains of the Central Provinces of Sri Lanka.

== Ecology ==
The Indian bush rats do not respond well to burning, with relative numbers declining in burnt grasslands compared to unburnt ones.

In Pakistan, stomach contents and fecal analyses showed that the Indian bush rat ate 27 species of grasses (especially Digitaria sanguinalis, Pennisetum orientale, and Triticum aestivum) along with wheat, gram seeds and young leaves of mustard.

The breeding season for the species in the dry habitats of western India is March to August, with litter sizes varying from 2 to 10.

The lice Polyplax indica, the tick Rhipicephalus haemaphysaloides, parasitizes the Indian bush rat. Indian bush rats in the Jaz Murian area of Iran were found to be free of endoparasites while several other sympatrically occurring rodents had several species of endoparasites. The Indian bush rat has also been found to host the plague flea Xenopsylla cheopis, but is thought to be a minor or negligible reservoir of plague since it usually harboured very few of these fleas.
