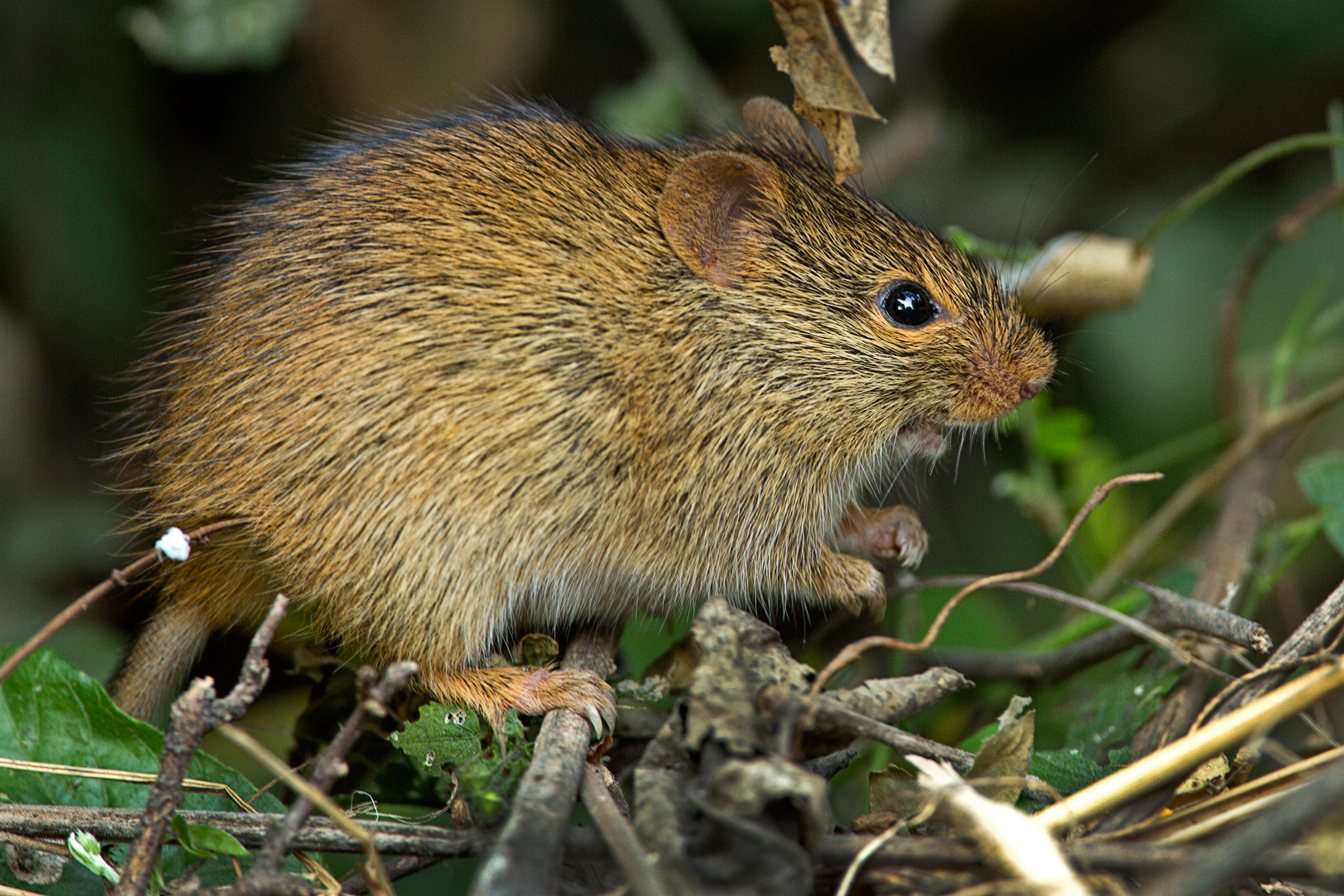
- Indian bush rat (Golunda ellioti)

Scientific classification
- Kingdom: Animalia
- Phylum: Chordata
- Class: Mammalia
- Order: Rodentia
- Family: Muridae
- Tribe: Arvicanthini
- Genus: Golunda; Gray, 1837

Species
- Golunda ellioti; †Golunda aouraghei; †Golunda dulamensis; †Golunda gurai; †Golunda jaegeri; †Golunda kelleri; †Golunda tatroticus

= Golunda =

Golunda Temporal range: Pliocene - Recent

Genus of rodent

Golunda is a genus of murine rodent.

== Fossil record ==
The Indian bush rat (Golunda ellioti) is the sole surviving member of this genus, but it was formerly more diverse and widespread, occurring in both Asia and Africa. The last surviving species in Africa was Golunda aouraghei from the Early Pleistocene. The genus was thought to have originated in Africa, with the Pliocene-aged G. gurai thought to be ancestral to all other species, but it is now thought that the genus originated in India with the species G. tatroticus, also from the Pliocene.
