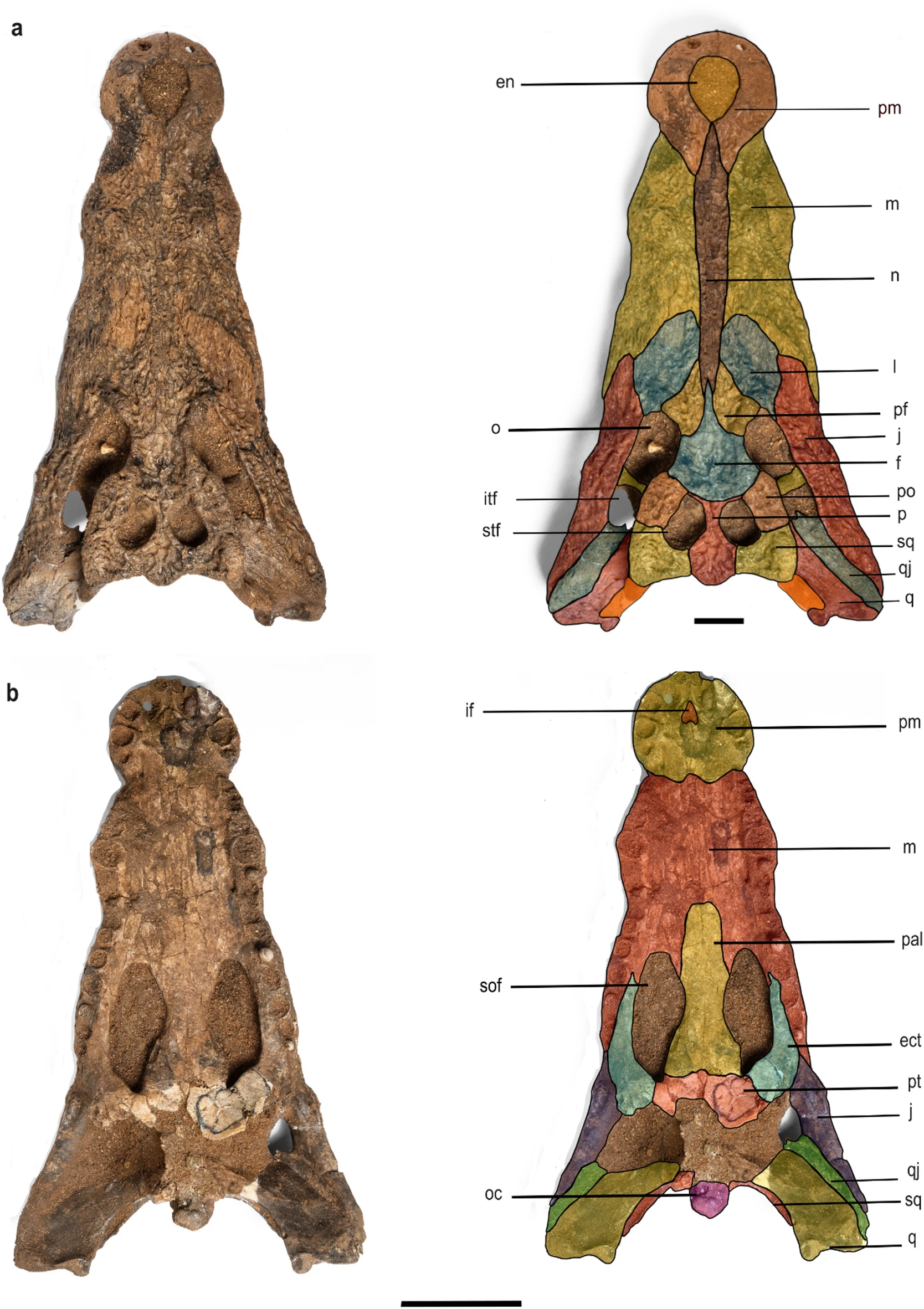
- Skull of Crocodylus sudani in dorsal and ventral view

Scientific classification
- Kingdom: Animalia
- Phylum: Chordata
- Class: Reptilia
- Clade: Archosauria
- Order: Crocodilia
- Superfamily: Crocodyloidea
- Family: Crocodylidae
- Genus: Crocodylus
- Species: †C. sudani

Binomial name
- †Crocodylus sudani Salih et al., 2025

= Crocodylus sudani =

Crocodylus sudani Temporal range: Late Pleistocene

Species of extinct crocodile

Crocodylus sudani is an extinct species of crocodile from the Late Pleistocene Middle Atbara River of Sudan. It has a narrow snout, upturned squamosal horns, and a small boss on its rostrum, generally displaying a mix of features seen in the extant Nile crocodile, sacred crocodile and some fossil species. These features and subsequent phylogenetic analyses suggest that C. sudani may have been more closely related to Pliocene to Pleistocene members of the genus Crocodylus such as C. thorbjarnarsoni, an enormous species from Kenya.

The only known skull of Crocodylus sudani dates to the Late Pleistocene and is approximately 90.000 to 60.000 years old. However, Khalafallah Salih and colleagues, who described the species in 2025, entertain the idea that the species could have persisted for longer than that. Regardless, this renders C. sudani the most recently extinct species of Crocodylus from Africa.

== History and naming ==
Fossil material of Crocodylus sudani was discovered along the Atbara River, a tributary of the Nile, in eastern Sudan. The region has previously yielded both Pleistocene artifacts and fossils from two major units, with those of C. sudani coming from the younger Khashm El Girba Synthem, thought to represent an interval from 60,000 to 90,000 years ago. The species was named in 2025 based on an almost complete skull designated Atbara 22–172, which became the holotype.

The species name of Crocodylus sudani references the country of Sudan.

== Description ==
Crocodylus sudani is superficially similar to modern sacred and Nile crocodiles, but ultimately shares a variety of features with so-called "paleoafrican" Crocodylus species such as C. thorbjarnarsoni and C. anthropophagus, as well as the Miocene species C. checchiai. One example of this can be found in this species in the prominent upturned squamosal "horns", similar to the condition found in the paleoafrican taxa, although C. sudani has a noticeably narrower snout.

The teardrop-shaped external naris is located towards the tip of the snout and directed anterodorsally, meaning that unlike in modern forms the opening is shifted somewhat forward instead of facing purely upward. The naris is almost entirely surrounded by the premaxillae, except for a small part where the nasal bones contact its posterior-most edge. Each premaxilla is pierced by a small opening just before the naris, which serves to receive the first dentary tooth when the jaws are closed. As is typical in Crocodylus, the snout bears a prominent constriction at the contact between premaxilla and maxilla where the fourth dentary tooth interlocks with the rest of the dentition. The premaxilla itself does stretch further back in the form of a process that extends between the maxilla laterally and the nasal medially until it reaches the level of the second maxillary tooth. Each premaxilla bears five tooth sockets, of which the fourth is the largest.

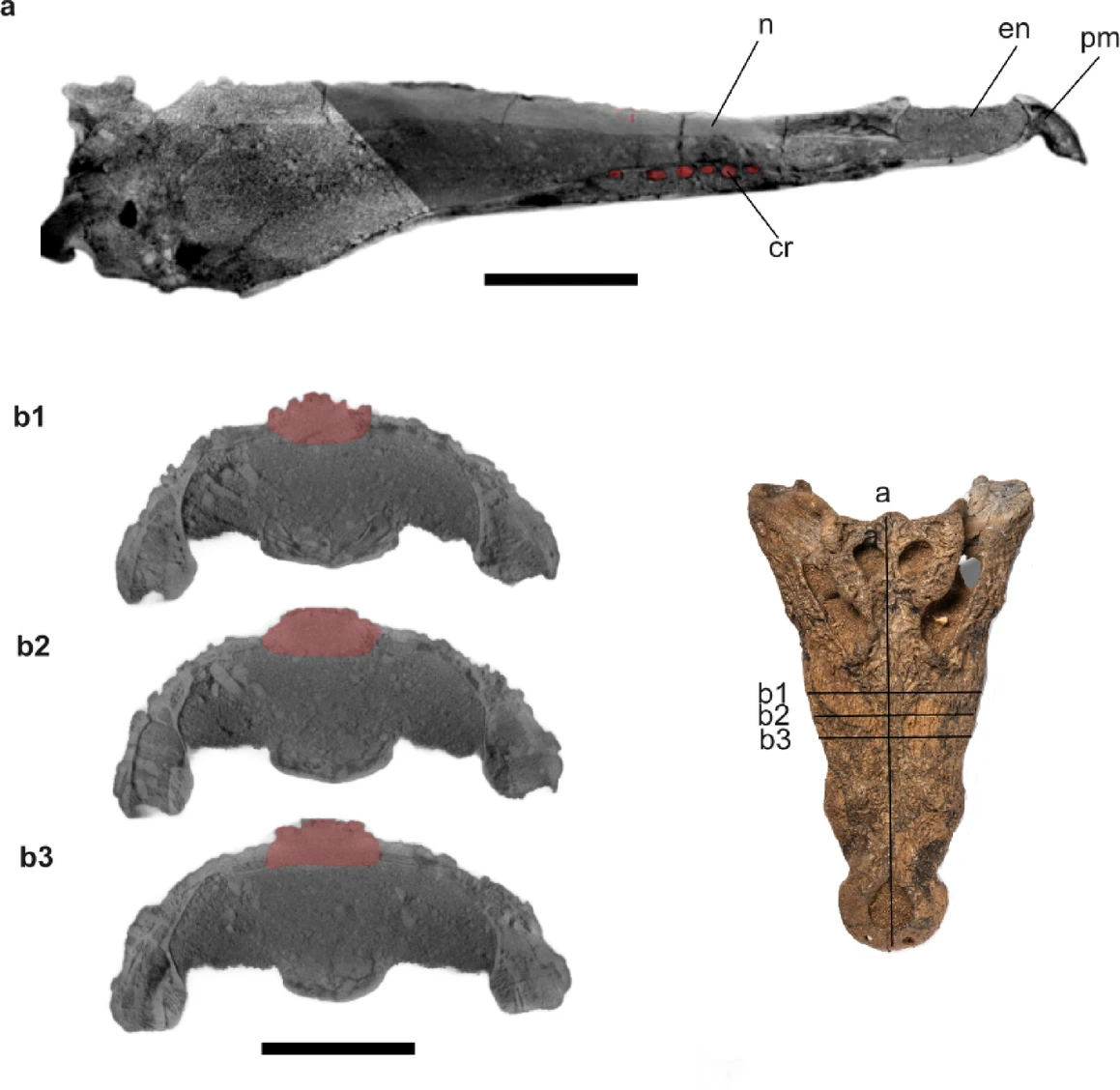
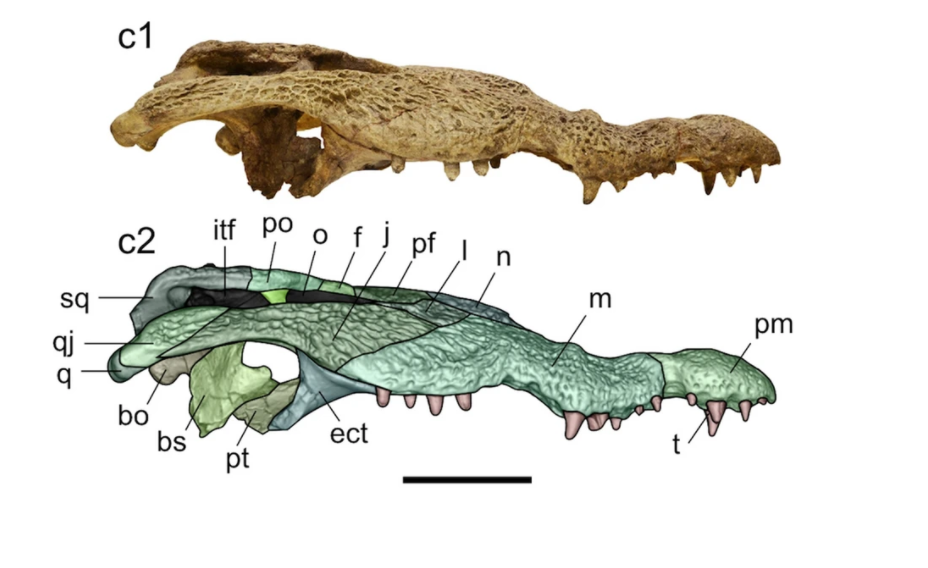
The rostrum of C. sudani was topped by a small rostral boss (top), similar to that seen in the older Crocodylus checchiai (bottom).

The outer edges of the rostrum are mostly formed by the deep maxillae, which in typical crocodilian fashion show undulating margins, something known as festooning. In the case of Crocodylus sudani, the maxilla constricts behind the eighth alveolus and before the ninth, where an occlusal pit indicates the presence of an interlocking dentary tooth. Following these the ninth alveolus is also separated by a small toothless region or diastema from the tenth, though most of the 14 maxillary alveoli are closely spaced. Among these the fifth is noted as being the largest, which not only coincides with the widest point of the maxilla prior to the constriction between the eight and ninth alveoli but also with the presence of a circular protuberance located above it.

The paired nasal bones form the uppermost section of the rostrum, stretching the space between the maxillae from the naris all the way to the region just before the eyes. The rostrum of Crocodylus sudani also bears what is referred as a "sagittal boss", a raised region of the skull similar albeit more weakly developed than what is seen in C. checchiai and some modern neotropic taxa.

The region just before the eyes is dominated by the lacrimal and prefrontal bones. The former are located further outward, begin anterior to the latter and are described as leaf-shaped. The prefrontals on the other hand are butterfly-shaped and located further medially, but most importantly bear a pair of knobs located just at the edge of the orbits, which are unknown in modern African species but can be observed in paleoafrican Crocodylus. The lacrimals and prefrontals are separated from their counterparts through the narrow anterior process of the frontal bone, which also fills the space between the eyesockets and continues onto the skull table. The edges of the orbit formed by the frontal are upturned.

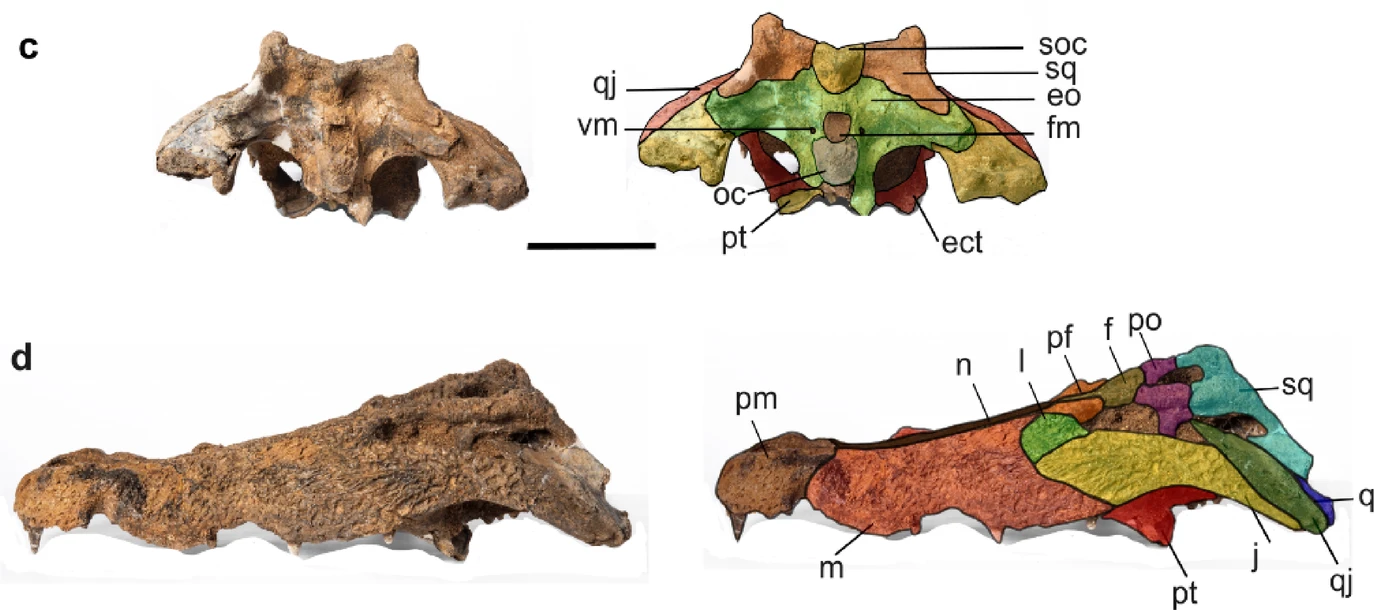
Unlike modern sacred and Nile crocodiles, Crocodylus sudani had prominently raised squamosal "horns".

In Crocodylus sudani, the skull table is trapezoid in shape, with the edges diverging at an angle of 11 degrees, similar to what is seen in C. thorbjarnarsoni, setting it apart from the rectangular skull table seen in sacred and Nile crocodiles. The dorsal surface of the skull table is formed by four bones, the posterior part of the frontal, the paired postorbitals and squamosal bones and the parietal bone. The frontal forms a convex suture with the postorbitals to its sides and the parietal towards the back, but does not participate in forming the D-shaped supratemporal fenestrae. The postorbitals are crescent-shaped, form the outer edges of skull table behind the eyesockets and connect to the squamosals in the back. The parietal forms the narrow space between the fenestrae but widens behind them only to taper again towards the back of the skull. Notably the supraoccipital bone is not exposed on the dorsal surface of the skull table as it is in C. thorbjarnarsoni and C. anthropophagus. A shared feature between these forms and what differentiates them from modern African species is represented by the morphology of the squamosals. In addition to contributing to the trapezoid shape of the skull table, the dorsal surface of the bone is raised in a manner that creates a low crest leading into a horn-like structure situated right above the otic aperture. When looking at the skull from the side the squamosal horn appears sub-triangular with rounded edges and an abrupt, steep posterior end, while looking at the skull table from behind reveals that the two horns form a gentle U-shape together. However, as noted by Salih and colleagues, these horns are not as prominent as they are in Crocodylus anthropophagus.

The jugal is an elongated bone that stretches from the maxilla towards the back of the skull, forming the lower margin of the orbit. It also contributes to the postorbital bar, forms much of the infratemporal fenestra and eventually comes into contact with the quadratojugal. The latter are another important feature that distinguishes C. sudani from the two extant African Crocodylus species, as in the Pleistocene taxon it forms the posteriodorsal corner of the infratemporal fenestra and forms a small, spine-like process that extends into the opening. In sacred and Nile crocodiles on the other hand the posterodorsal corner is actually formed by the quadrate bone.

Looking at the skull from below reveals a small and heart-shaped incisive foramen and a W-shaped suture between the premaxillae and the vaulted maxillae. The palatines are long and form a convex, U-shaped suture with the maxillae in the front and a straight suture with the pterygoid bone at the posterior edge of the suborbital fenestrae. The ectopterygoids form the outer edge of the fenestrae and the inner margin of the maxillary toothrow, stretching as far forward as the 11th maxillary alveolus. In modern African Crocodylus species the anterior tip of the ectopterygoid is variably forked or unforked, though the former is regarded as being more common. By contrast, the single known skull of C. sudani shows an unforked anterior ectopterygoid tip.

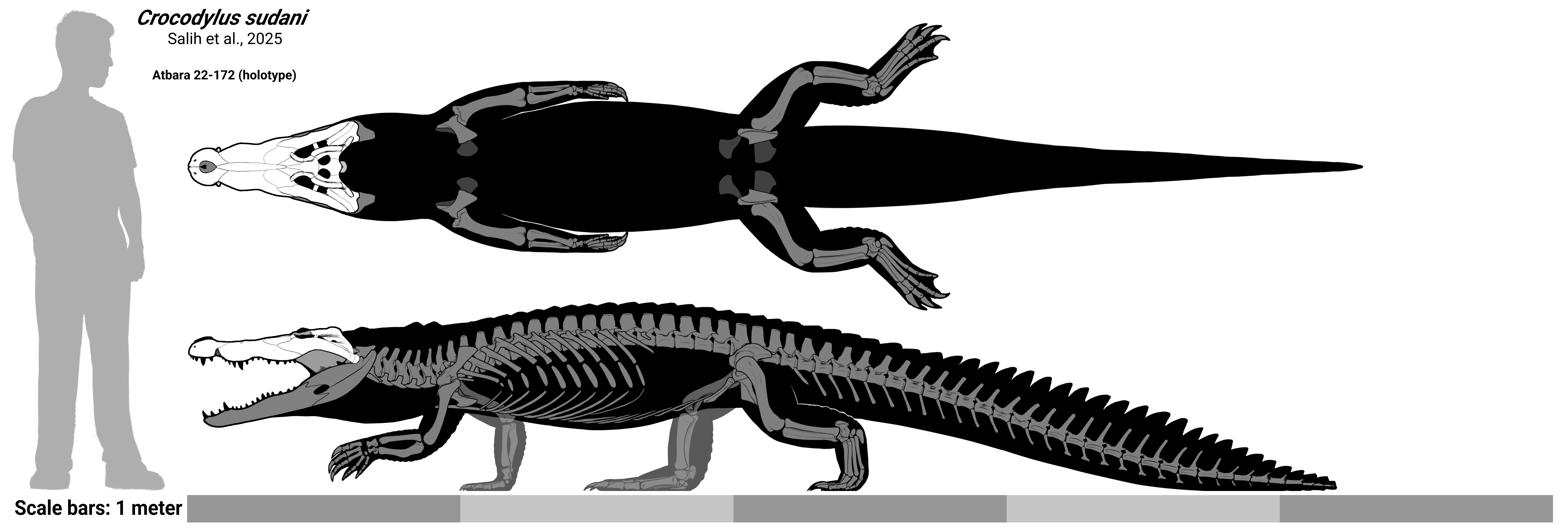
Size comparison of Crocodylus sudani and a human.

=== Size ===
The skull of Crocodylus sudani measures 57 cm (22 in) in length and 34 cm (13 in) in width across the quadrates. From this a total body length of around 4–4.3 m (13–14 ft) has been calculated.

== Phylogeny ==
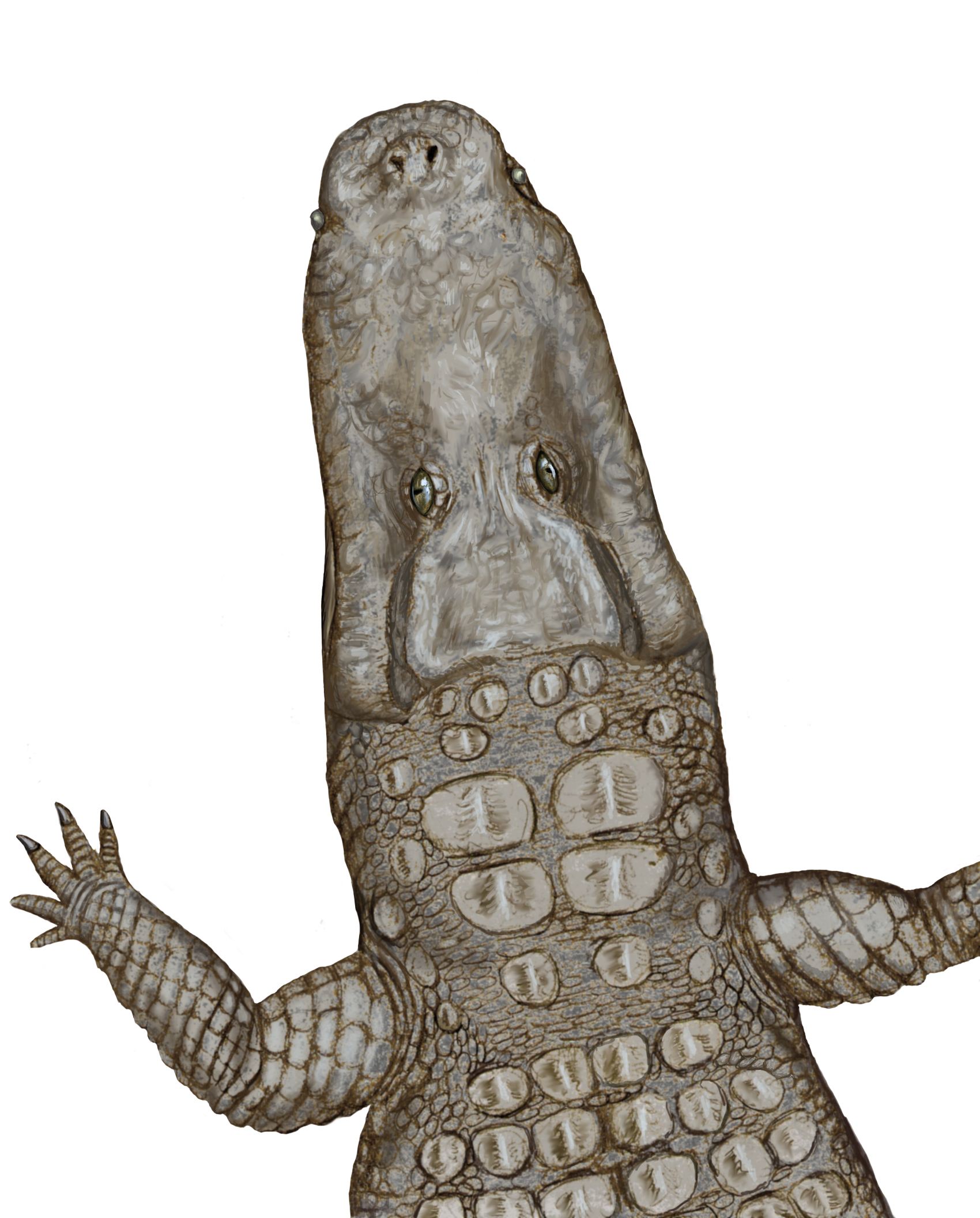
Phylogenetic analysis seem to indicate that C. sudani was closely related to species like Crocodylus thorbjarnarsoni

Two phylogenetic analyses based on two different datasets were run in an attempt to recover the relation between Crocodylus sudani and other extinct as well as extant crocodiles. Utilizing the matrix of Azzara et al. 2021, itself derived from the work of Brochu and Storrs, recovers C. sudani among the basalmost species of the genus, forming a clade with the "paleoafrican Crocodylus" species C. anthropophagus from the Pleistocene of Tanzania and C. thorbjarnarsoni from the Pleistocene of Kenya. Within this clade it was found as the sister taxon to C. anthropophagus specifically and on a greater scale this branch of the genus diverged prior to the split between the Indo-Pacific clade (consisting of taxa like the saltwater and freshwater crocodile) and the African-Neotropic clade (formed by species from the Americas and modern African forms).

A second analysis was run using the matrix utilized by Chabrol and colleagues in their osteology of Crocodylus palaeindicus, yielding vastly different results. In this analysis, C. sudani still clades with C. thorbjarnarsoni; however, in this instance, C. thorbjarnarsoni is more closely related to the purported osteolaemine Kinyang from the Miocene of Kenya. The Miocene Crocodylus checchiai is basal to all three of these. As a whole, this grouping of African fossil forms nests in a group otherwise formed by exclusively American species. In contrast to the analysis run using the Azzara dataset, the Nile crocodile was recovered as aligning with most of the Indo-Pacific forms, sans the two species from Papua New Guinea. C. anthropophagus appears entirely unrelated to C. sudani in this analysis, having been recovered as one of the basalmost members of the genus.

Salih and colleagues find that the grouping of C. sudani with paleoafrican Crocodylus is supported by four synapomorphies in the first analysis, with one additional synapomorphy in support of its closer relationship with C. anthropophagus. Meanwhile, the analysis run using the dataset from Chabrol and colleagues supports the position with three unambiguous synapomorphies. However, both results are poorly supported, only really indicating that C. sudani was likely closer to African fossil forms rather than modern Nile and sacred crocodiles.

The phylogenetic results recovered from the Azzara et al. dataset are shown to the left, those derived from the Chabrol et al. dataset on the right.

- - - †Crocodylus thorbjarnarsoni
    - - †Crocodylus anthropophagus
      - †Crocodylus sudani
  - - †Crocodylus palaeindicus
    - - Crocodylus niloticus (Nile crocodile)
      - - †Crocodylus checchiai
        - Crocodylus moreletii (Morelet's crocodile)
        - Crocodylus intermedius (Orinoco crocodile)
        - Crocodylus acutus (American crocodile)
        - Crocodylus rhombifer (Cuban crocodile)
    - - Crocodylus palustris (Mugger crocodile)
      - - - †Crocodylus ossifragus
          - Crocodylus siamensis (Siamese crocodile)
        - - Crocodylus mindorensis (Philippine crocodile)
          - Crocodylus johnstoni (Freshwater crocodile)
          - Crocodylus porosus (Saltwater crocodile)
          - - Crocodylus novaeguineae (New Guinea crocodile)
            - Crocodylus raninus (Borneo crocodile)

- - †Crocodylus megarhinus
  - - Mecistops cataphractus (Slender-snouted crocodile)
    - - †Crocodylus anthropophagus
      - - - Crocodylus mindorensis (Philippine crocodile)
          - Crocodylus novaeguineae (New Guinea crocodile)
        - - - Crocodylus niloticus (Nile crocodile)
            - - - Crocodylus porosus (Saltwater crocodile)
                - Crocodylus siamensis (Siamese crocodile)
              - - Crocodylus johnstoni (Freshwater crocodile)
                - - †Crocodylus palaeindicus
                  - Crocodylus palustris (Mugger crocodile)
          - - †Crocodylus falconensis
            - Crocodylus rhombifer (Cuban crocodile)
            - Crocodylus moreletii (Morelet's crocodile)
            - - Crocodylus intermedius (Orinoco crocodile)
              - Crocodylus acutus (American crocodile)
            - - †Crocodylus checchiai
              - - Crocodylus sudani
                - - †Crocodylus thorbjarnarsoni
                  - †Kinyang mabokoensis

== Extinction ==
Crocodylus sudani lived at a time when the region around the Atbara River was characterized by a humid environment, moist grassy biomes, permanent bodies of water and adjacent woody grassland savannah. Dating of the specific units suggest that C. sudani lived during the late Pleistocene, with Tsukamoto et al. suggesting an age of 92 ± 8 thousand years ago while Mohammednoor et al. put the age of these strata at 90.000 to 60.000 years. Salih and colleagues highlight that Africa experienced considerable aridification throughout the Middle to Late Pleistocene, which also affected the range of local crocodilians. The modern sacred crocodile for example is primarily known from western Africa but has also been reported from the east in countries like Uganda and Ethiopia in addition to its historic sympatry with Nile crocodiles in Egypt and Sudan (specifically in the White Nile), regions once connected by larger freshwater systems such as the now dried up Mega Lake Chad.

Based on these factors Salih and colleagues speculate that it is not impossible that C. sudani may have survived past its supposed extinction date, persisting as a cryptic species. The team goes as far as to entertain the idea that C. sudani could persist into the modern day, citing poor sampling of crocodiles in its former range and superficial similarities to the extant species. However they also acknowledge that further investigation and sampling of Sudanese crocodiles would be required to actually explore this idea in depth.
