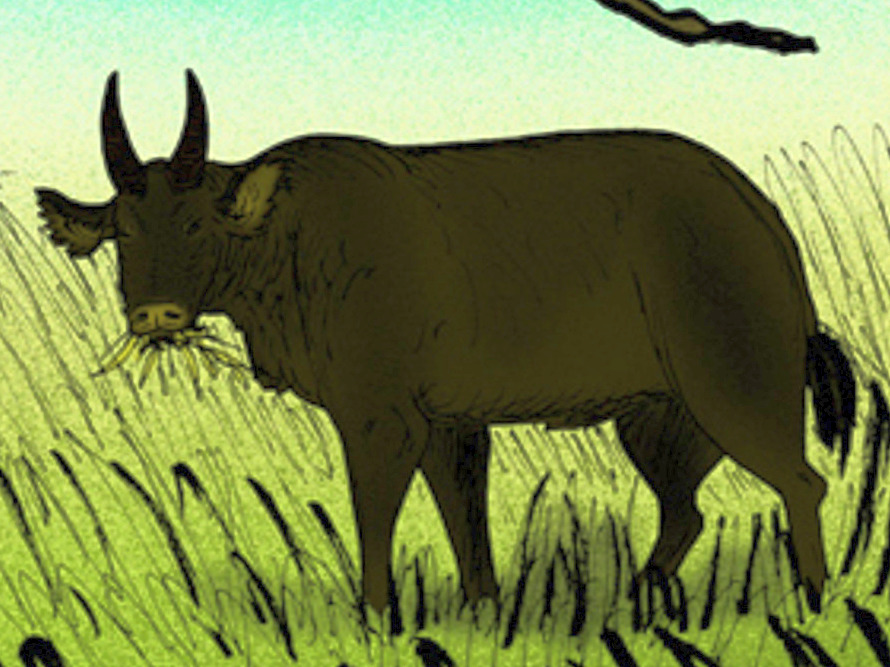
- Life restoration of Ugandax gautieri

Scientific classification
- Domain: Eukaryota
- Kingdom: Animalia
- Phylum: Chordata
- Class: Mammalia
- Order: Artiodactyla
- Family: Bovidae
- Subfamily: Bovinae
- Subtribe: Bubalina
- Genus: †Ugandax; Cooke & Coryndon, 1970

Species
- Ugandax gautieri Cooke & Coryndon, 1970; Ugandax coryndonae Gentry, 2006

= Ugandax =

Ugandax Temporal range: Miocene–Pleistocene

Extinct genus of mammals

Ugandax is an extinct genus of bovines in the subtribe Bubalina that lived from the Miocene to the Pleistocene of Africa. Cladistic analyses suggest Ugandax represents an ancestral form of the African buffalo, Syncerus, and teeth assigned to Ugandax represent the earliest appearance of bovines in Africa.
