= Zeresenay Alemseged =

Ethiopian paleoanthropologist

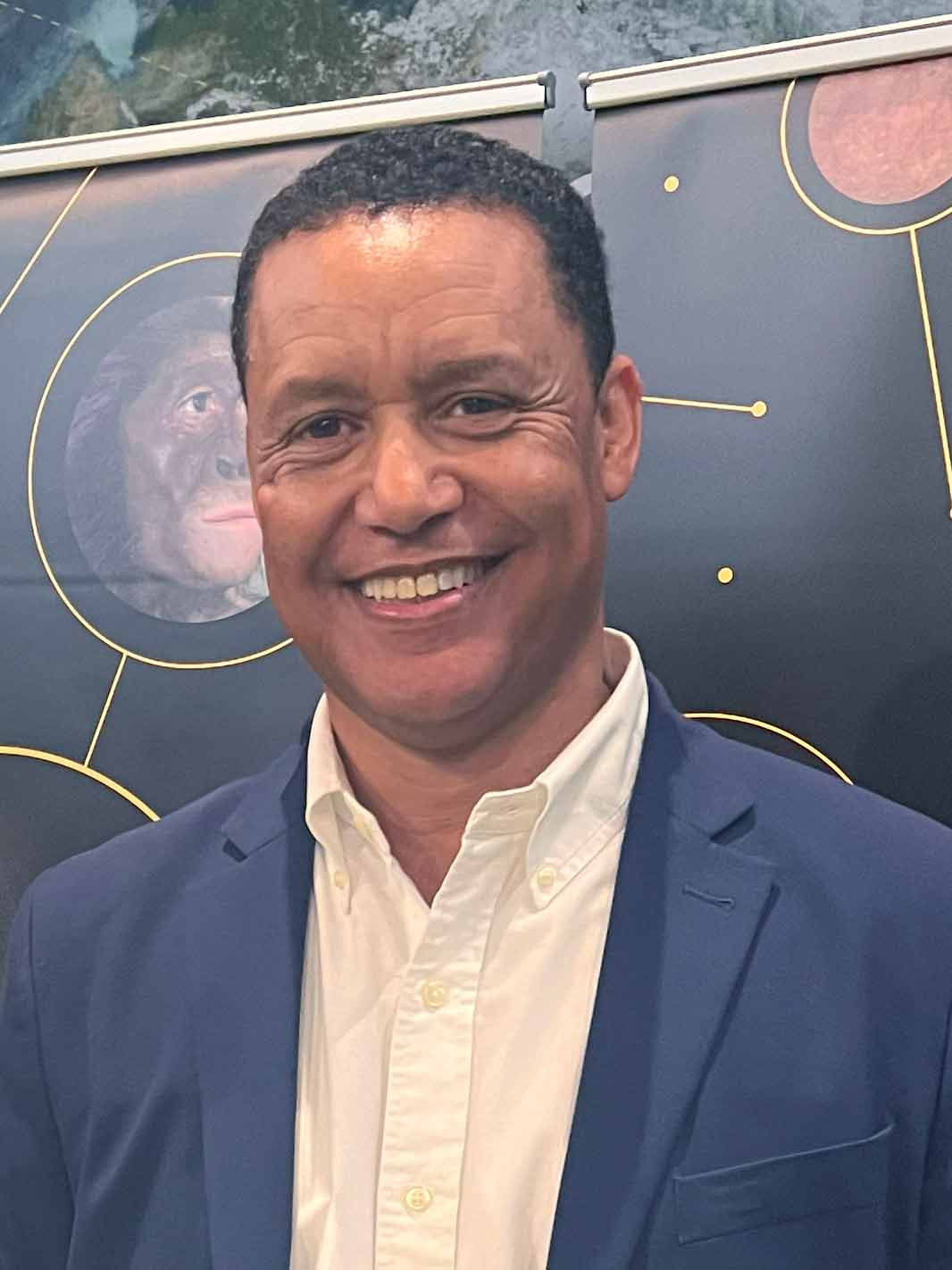
- Alemseged's profile photo
- Born: Axum, Ethiopia
- Education: Addis Ababa University, University of Paris
- Known for: Paleoanthropology and the discovery of the Selam/Dikika Child Australopithcecus afarensis fossil
- Scientific career
- Fields: Paleoanthropology, Anthropology
- Workplaces: University of Chicago

Zeresenay "Zeray" Alemseged is a paleoanthropologist who is a faculty member at the University of Chicago. In 2013, he was named a Fellow of the American Association for the Advancement of Science. He was elected to the American Academy of Arts & Sciences in 2021. In 2022, he was appointed to the Comité Scientifique International du Musée d'Anthropologie Préhistorique de Monaco and the Pontifical Academy of Science.

Alemseged is best known for his discovery, on 10 December 2000, of Selam, also referred to as the "Dikika child" or "Lucy's child", the almost-complete fossilized remains of a 3.3 million-year-old child of the species Australopithecus afarensis. The "world's oldest child", she is the most complete skeleton of a human ancestor discovered to date. Selam represents a milestone in understanding of human and pre-human evolution and contributes significantly to understanding of the biology and childhood of early species in the human lineage, a subject about which little is known. Alemseged discovered Selam while working with the Dikika Research Project (DRP), a multi-national research project funded in part by the National Science Foundation, which he led after initiating in 1999. Alemseged's research focuses on early hominin skeletal biology, environmental context, and behavior.

== Education and career ==
Alemseged began his professional career as a geologist. After graduating with a B.Sc. in Geology from Addis Ababa University in Ethiopia in 1990, he began working as a Junior Geologist in the National Museum of Ethiopia's Paleoanthropology Laboratory.

After obtaining a French language diploma in 1993, from the International Language School in Vichy, France, he began a M.Sc. program in the Institut des sciences de l'évolution at the University of Montpellier II in France. He completed this program in 1994 and earned a Ph.D. in paleoanthropology through the Laboratory of Paleontology at Pierre and Marie Curie University and the Muséum national d'histoire naturelle, Paris in 1998.

Alemseged then moved back to Ethiopia, and it was the next year, 1999, while working as a research associate at the National Museum of Ethiopia and the French Center for Ethiopian Studies in Addis Ababa, Ethiopia, that he formed the Dikika Research Project (DRP), the first Ethiopian-led paleoanthropological field research project, whose ongoing multi-national and multi-disciplinary mission is aimed at recovering data addressing Alemseged's primary research interests: hominin evolution and the ways by which that evolution was influenced by the paleoenvironment. Alemseged both leads the project and studies the recovered hominins and other primates.

From 2000 to 2003 Alemseged worked as a postdoctoral research associate at the Institute of Human Origins in the School of Human Evolution and Social Change at Arizona State University. It was at the beginning of his postdoctoral research that Alemseged made his most significant discovery of "Selam". Only one small piece of Selam's skeleton was found in 2000; it would take an additional six years for her to be fully extracted and analyzed before preliminary results were published in Nature in 2006. In 2004 Alemseged moved back to Europe and became a senior researcher in the Department of Human Evolution at the Max Planck Institute for Evolutionary Anthropology in Leipzig, Germany. Alemseged stayed with the Max Planck Institute until 2008, at which point he became the Curator and Irvine Chair of Anthropology at the California Academy of Sciences in San Francisco.

In 2016, Alemseged joined the University of Chicago where he was later named the Donald N. Pritzker Professor.

== The Dikika Child "Selam" ==
On December 10, 2000, the Dikika Research Project (DRP), led by Dr. Alemseged, found the first piece of a major paleoanthropological discovery. The team, which was then composed of only Alemseged and three Ethiopian assistants, found the skull of a fossilized child that year and over the course of five successive field seasons between 2000 and 2005, after an intensive process of screening and excavation, the team recovered the partial skeleton of Selam: the earliest and most complete juvenile human ancestor ever found. She is a member of the species Australopithecus afarensis, she was 3 years old when she died and she predated Lucy by 150,000 years.

The discovery's significance lay not only in Selam's antiquity, but also in her age at death. Although relatively complete infant skeletons have been recovered for more recent human species, not a single juvenile skeleton has been found for any of the species in the preceding millions of years. Most of these early finds consist of nothing more than a skull, a piece of jaw or some isolated teeth. In contrast to these relatively sparse finds, not only was the DRP team able to recover Selam's complete skull, but also a sandstone impression of her brain and even the hyoid bone. Due to the fragility of the hyoid, such a discovery in a species of Selam's antiquity is almost completely unprecedented. The team was able to recover a significant portion of Selam's bones below the neck as well, including most of the spinal column, the ribs, both collar bones and both shoulder blades. These bones are almost completely absent in the fossil record, except for fragmentary pieces from Lucy. Both knee caps and large portions of the thigh and shin bones from each leg were recovered, as well as an almost complete foot.

The bones show no indications of cuts or abrasions, nor do they show the type of damage associated with scavenging carnivores; this suggests that she was buried rapidly, perhaps by a flood, shortly after her death. It is also possible that it was this flood event which killed her. As the sediment pressed down on her through the years, Selam's bones became basically glued together in a highly compressed sandstone block. Usually paleoanthropologists struggle to reassemble fragmentary skeletal finds so as to place them back together, but Alemseged faced the exact opposite situation with Selam. He worked painstakingly to extricate her impacted skeleton, using dental tools and removing the soil from her ribs and twisted spinal column virtually grain by grain. The process took 6 years before it announced in 2006 and is still ongoing.

Selam's skull was CT scanned and it was this method that allowed her sex and age at death to be determined. Further analyses were able to establish the size of Selam's brain which, at approximately 330 cubic centimeters, would not have been very different from that of a 3-year-old chimpanzee. Whereas chimpanzees at this age have already formed over 90% of their brains, Selam had formed less than 90% of the adult brain size of her species when she died. This might point to a relatively slow brain growth in Australopithecus afarensis, similar to the brain growth pattern of modern humans, rather than that of chimps; this may point to a possible behavioral shift in Selam's species 3.5 million years ago and the emergence of the delayed pattern of brain development and maturity that we know of as human "childhood".

The post-cranial skeleton also yielded several important lines of data regarding the locomotion (movement) and height of Australopithecus afarensis. The femur (thigh bone), tibia (shin bone), and foot indicate that Selam (and hence the species she represents) walked fully upright, even at 3 years old, while the shoulder bones are more similar to those of gorillas. Selam's fingers, as well as those of other members of Australopithecus afarensis, are long and curved. This suggests that while the species was an effective biped while on the ground, it retained the ability to climb, which would have been a beneficial adaptation for avoiding predators, especially at night and especially for the smaller or younger members of the species.

The rare presence of the hyoid bone also yielded some significant data pertaining to Selam's species. In this bone Selam is more similar to the African great apes than she is to modern humans. Along with a single Neanderthal example, Selam's hyoid is one of only two extinct hominin hyoids preserved in the fossil record and is the only example from a species of her antiquity. This bone is presumed to have played an important role in the development of human speech and its recovery gives us some clues towards understanding the nature and evolution of the human voicebox. This extraordinary ancient skeleton preserves a mosaic of features shared by both humans and the apes and clearly shows that both the anatomy and behavior of our ancestors was changing, slowly but progressively. In other words, evolution was in the making.

== Research projects ==
The DRP
Alemseged's research interests lie in the discovery and analysis of new hominin and non-human primate fossils, with emphasis on the link between morphological changes over time and environmental transformations. To support these goals with new data, Alemseged initiated the Dikika Research Project (DRP) in 1999. This multidisciplinary project undertakes field research on sediments spanning in age from about 4.0 million to less than 500,000 years ago and addresses some of the major questions in paleoanthropology. The Pliocene site of Dikika, in Ethiopia, from which the project derives its name, is uniquely suited to answering these questions due to its strategic chronological placement. Sediments from Dikika are older than the oldest sediments from Hadar and are therefore closer to the time interval in which there is some fragmentary evidence for the diverse nature of the human lineage. Asbole on the other hand, another site studied by the DRP, represents the Middle Pleistocene, a time period that is poorly understood in the region.

== Previous professional activities ==
The EAAPP
Alemseged was the Vice Chairperson and Chairperson of the East African Association of Paleontologists and Paleoanthropologists (the EAAPP), before stepping down in 2022, which he co-founded along with Chairperson Dr. Emma Mbua. The EAAPP was officially launched in Kenya on July 18, 2005, and is the first organization of its kind in this region. Members of the EAAPP meet biannually to report on their research findings and address issues such as policy regarding research requirements, collections management, and fieldwork ethics. Though the research area is limited to East Africa, the researchers are a diverse group made up of scientists and students from Kenya, Ethiopia, Eritrea, Uganda, Tanzania, South Africa, Japan, Europe and the Americas.

California Academy of Sciences

The collaborative environment, in which original research and public outreach are given primacy, at the California Academy of Sciences (CAS) in San Francisco was suited to Alemseged's interests.

Alemseged and the DRP return to the Dikika field site every fall for anthropological work. The team's research during these field seasons has contributed significantly to the academy's research on human origins and has added valuable data to the CAS Anthropological collection. Th multidisciplinary approach by the California Academy of Sciences to the biogeography of the region facilitates the study of the full spectrum of Africa's natural history and its vital role as the birthplace of mankind.

== See also ==
- Dawn of Humanity (2015 PBS film)
