= Crocuta eturono =

Crocuta eturono Temporal range: Late Pliocene

Scientific classification
- Kingdom: Animalia
- Phylum: Chordata
- Class: Mammalia
- Infraclass: Placentalia
- Order: Carnivora
- Family: Hyaenidae
- Genus: Crocuta
- Species: †C. eturono

Binomial name
- †Crocuta eturono Werdelin and Lewis, 2008

Extinct species of hyena in the genus Crocuta

Crocuta eturono is an extinct species of hyena in the genus Crocuta that lived in what is now Kenya during the Piacenzian stage of the Pliocene epoch.

== Etymology ==
The specific epithet eturono means "robust" in the Turkana language.
