= Parmularius =

Parmularius Temporal range: Pliocene - Pleistocene

Scientific classification
- Domain: Eukaryota
- Kingdom: Animalia
- Phylum: Chordata
- Class: Mammalia
- Order: Artiodactyla
- Family: Bovidae
- Subfamily: Antilopinae
- Tribe: Alcelaphini
- Genus: †Parmularius; Hopwood, 1934

Species
- P. pachyceras; P. ambiquus; P. pandatus; P. atlanticus; P. rugosus; P. altidens; P. angusticornis; P. maasaicus

Extinct genus of mammals

Parmularius is a genus of large extinct African alcelaphines from the Pliocene and Pleistocene. It is a close relative of topi and hartebeest. One species is noticeable by its long, weakly curved horns.
