= Yves Coppens =

French anthropologist (1934–2022)

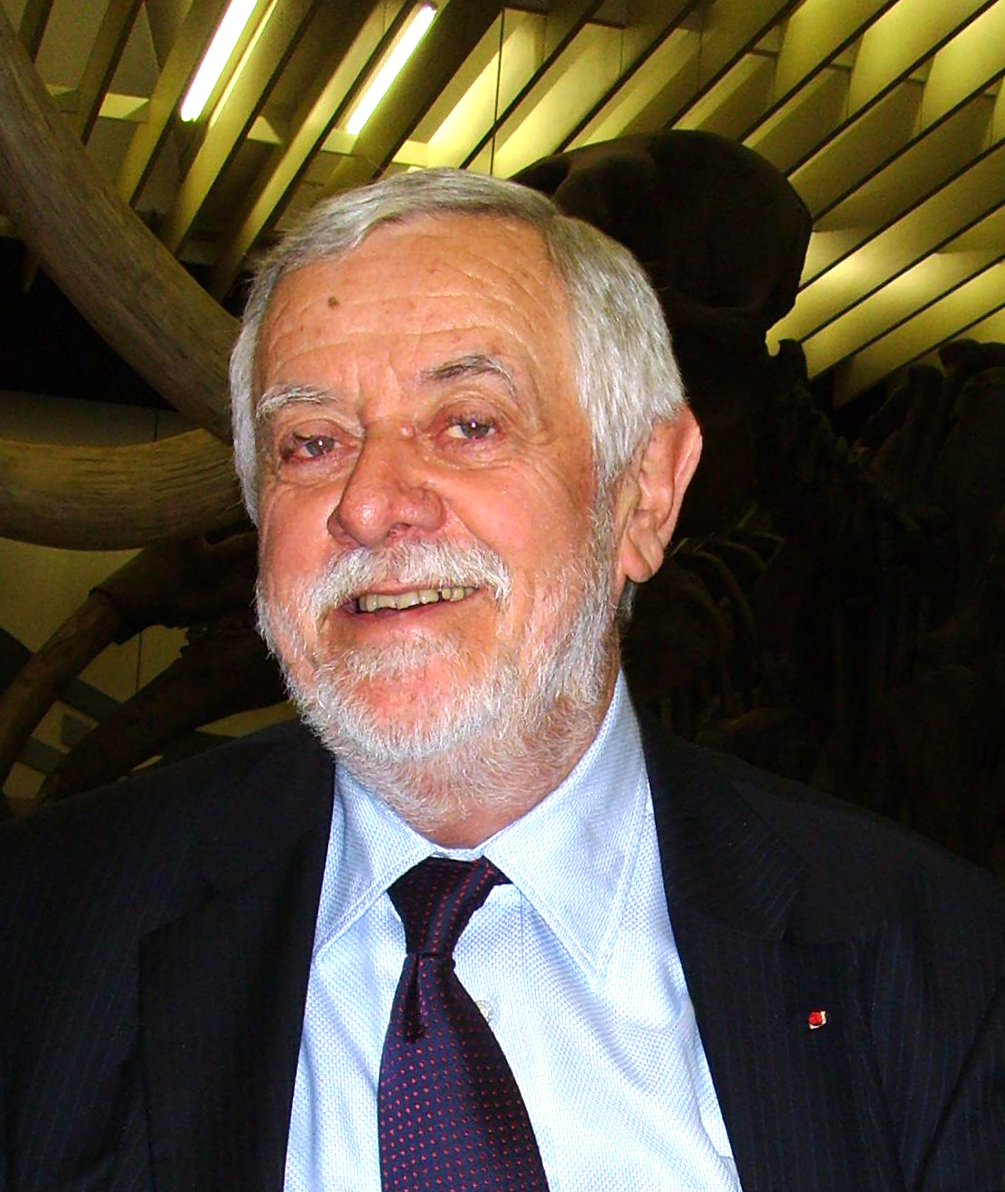
- Coppens in 2008
- Born: 9 August 1934; Vannes, France
- Died: 22 June 2022 (aged 87); Paris, France
- Education: University of Rennes; University of Paris
- Known for: Co-discovery of "Lucy"
- Awards: Grand Officer of the National Order of the Legion of Honour Grand Cross of the National Order of Merit of France; Commander of the Order of Arts and Letters of France; Commander of the Order of Academic Palms of France; Commander of the Order of Cultural Merit of Monaco Officer of the National Order of Chad; Kalinga Prize (1984)

Yves Coppens (9 August 1934 – 22 June 2022) was a French anthropologist and co-discoverer of "Lucy". A graduate from the University of Rennes and the Sorbonne, he studied ancient hominids and had multiple published works on this topic, and also produced a film. In October 2014, Coppens was named an Ordinary Member of the Pontifical Academy of Sciences by Pope Francis.

== Scientific work ==
He was Professor at the College de France, which is considered to be France's most prestigious research establishment.

Richard Dawkins makes the following observation in The Ancestor's Tale: "Incidentally, I don't know what to make of the fact that in his native France, Yves Coppens is widely cited as the discoverer of Lucy, even as the 'father' of Lucy. In the English-speaking world, this important discovery is universally attributed to Donald Johanson". This confusion is because Coppens was the former director of the Hadar expedition. Donald Johanson, who led the 1974 expedition, was the one who found Lucy. The "Rift Valley theory", proposed and supported by the Dutch primatologist Adriaan Kortlandt, became better known when it was later espoused and renamed by Coppens as the "East Side Story". However, this paradigm has been challenged by the discovery of Australopithecus bahrelghazali (Abel) and by the discovery of Sahelanthropus tchadensis by Michel Brunet's team in Toumaï in Chad (2,500 km to west Rift Valley).

The main-belt asteroid 172850 Coppens was named in his honour. The official naming citation was published by the Minor Planet Center on 21 March 2008 (M.P.C. 62357).

Coppens advised on the French film Une Femme ou Deux (English: One Woman or Two; 1985).

== Academies ==
Yves Coppens was a member of the French Academy of Sciences, the French Academy of Medicine, the Pontifical Academy of Sciences of Vatican, the French Outremer Academy of Sciences, the Academia Europaea, the Royal Academy of Sciences Hassan II of Morocco, the African Academy of Sciences, Arts, Cultures and Diasporas of Côte d'Ivoire, Honorary Member of the São Paulo Academy of Medicine, Associate Member of the Royal Academy of Sciences, Letters and Fine Arts of Belgium, correspondent of the Royal Belgian Academy of Medicine, honorary member of the Royal Anthropological Institute of Great Britain and Ireland, foreign associate of the Royal Society of South Africa.

== Death ==
Coppens died in Paris on 22 June 2022 at the age of 87.

== Awards ==
- Grand Officer of the National Order of the Legion of Honour
- Grand Cross of the National Order of Merit of France^{,}
- Commander of the Order of Arts and Letters of France
- Commander of the Order of Academic Palms of France
- Commander of the Order of Cultural Merit of Monaco
- Officer of the National Order of Chad

== Doctorate honoris causa ==
- Doctorate honoris causa of the University of Chicago
- Doctorate honoris causa of the University of Bologna
- Doctorate honoris causa of the University of Mons
- Doctorate honoris causa of the University of Liège

== Charter of environment ==
Yves Coppens chaired the commission which wrote the French Charter for the Environment of 2004, now part of the French Constitution.

== See also ==
- A Species Odyssey
