= Meanings of minor-planet names: 172001–173000 =

As minor planet discoveries are confirmed, they are given a permanent number by the IAU's Minor Planet Center (MPC), and the discoverers can then submit names for them, following the IAU's naming conventions. The list below concerns those minor planets in the specified number-range that have received names, and explains the meanings of those names.

Official naming citations of newly named small Solar System bodies are approved and published in a bulletin by IAU's Working Group for Small Bodies Nomenclature (WGSBN). Before May 2021, citations were published in MPC's Minor Planet Circulars for many decades. Recent citations can also be found on the JPL Small-Body Database (SBDB). Until his death in 2016, German astronomer Lutz D. Schmadel compiled these citations into the Dictionary of Minor Planet Names (DMP) and regularly updated the collection.

Based on Paul Herget's The Names of the Minor Planets, Schmadel also researched the unclear origin of numerous asteroids, most of which had been named prior to World War II. This article incorporates text from this source, which is in the public domain: SBDB New namings may only be added to this list below after official publication as the preannouncement of names is condemned. The WGSBN publishes a comprehensive guideline for the naming rules of non-cometary small Solar System bodies.

== 172001–172100 ==
Named minor planet	Provisional	This minor planet was named for...	Ref · Catalog
172090 Davidmccomas	2002 CL_{257}	David J. McComas (born 1958), a professor of astrophysical sciences at Princeton University, served as a Co-Investigator on the Particles and Plasma Science Team for the New Horizons mission to Pluto.	JPL · 172090

== 172101–172200 ==
back to top

Named minor planet	Provisional	This minor planet was named for...	Ref · Catalog
172191 Ralphmcnutt	2002 PH_{152}	Ralph McNutt (born 1953) is a senior scientist at the Johns Hopkins University Applied Physics Laboratory. He served as a science team co-investigator and as the Principal Investigator of the PEPSSI instrument aboard the New Horizons mission to Pluto.	JPL · 172191

== 172201–172300 ==
back to top

Named minor planet	Provisional	This minor planet was named for...	Ref · Catalog
172269 Tator	2002 TJ_{69}	Michael Tator (1956–2009), German amateur astronomer and co-founder of Turtle Star Observatory in Muelheim-Ruhr	JPL · 172269

== 172301–172400 ==
back to top

Named minor planet	Provisional	This minor planet was named for...	Ref · Catalog
172315 Changqiaoxiaoxue	2002 TL_{300}	Suzhou ChangQiao Primary School. It was founded in 1911 and is located in the historic town of Lishu, China.	JPL · 172315
172317 Walterbos	2002 TZ_{315}	René Walterbos (born 1957), Dutch–American astronomer with the Sloan Digital Sky Survey	JPL · 172317
172318 Wangshui	2002 TY_{342}	Shu-i Wang (born 1964), American optical engineer with the Sloan Digital Sky Survey	JPL · 172318

== 172401–172500 ==
back to top

Named minor planet	Provisional	This minor planet was named for...	Ref · Catalog
172425 Taliajacobi	2003 OJ_{18}	Talia Jacobi (born 1977), Israeli medical student, nature guide and fan of astronomy, wife of the discoverer David Polishook	JPL · 172425
172430 Sergiofonti	2003 QL_{8}	Sergio Fonti (1945–2018) was a planetary scientist and Professor at Lecce University. He worked on the Rosetta, Mars Express and Venus Express space missions.	IAU · 172430

== 172501–172600 ==
back to top

Named minor planet	Provisional	This minor planet was named for...	Ref · Catalog
172505 Kimberlyespy	2003 SC_{202}	Kimberly Andrews Espy (born 1963) is the former Senior Vice President for Research at the University of Arizona, and was instrumental in establishing the space situational awareness initiative. A translational clinical neuroscientist and psychologist, she pioneered the integration of cognitive neuroscience tools.	JPL · 172505
172525 Adamblock	2003 TY_{1}	Adam Block (born 1973), American astronomy popularizer, discoverer of minor planets and astronomical director of the Mount Lemmon Science Center	JPL · 172525
172526 Carolinegarcia	2003 TN_{3}	Caroline M. Garcia (born 1961) is the Associate Vice President for Research at the University of Arizona. She has been instrumental in the administration of research resources at the university. An accountant by training, she has served the university for more than three decades.	JPL · 172526
172593 Vörösmarty	2003 VM	Mihály Vörösmarty (1800–1855) was a poet and dramatist, one of the greatest Hungarian romanticists, and a full member of the Hungarian Academy of Science. His poetry Szózat became a second national anthem, and Csongor és Tünde is one of the best Hungarian plays of the nineteenth century.	JPL · 172593

== 172601–172700 ==
back to top

Named minor planet	Provisional	This minor planet was named for...	Ref · Catalog
There are no named minor planets in this number range

== 172701–172800 ==
back to top

Named minor planet	Provisional	This minor planet was named for...	Ref · Catalog
172734 Giansimon	2004 CN_{1}	Gianluca (born 1969) and Simona (born 1971), sons of Italian co-discoverer Giancarlo Fagioli	JPL · 172734

== 172801–172900 ==
back to top

Named minor planet	Provisional	This minor planet was named for...	Ref · Catalog
172850 Coppens	2005 EU_{27}	Yves Coppens (born 1934), French paleoanthropologist, codiscoverer of the Australopithecus afarensis Lucy	JPL · 172850

== 172901–173000 ==
back to top

Named minor planet	Provisional	This minor planet was named for...	Ref · Catalog
172932 Bachleitner	2005 JC	Hannes Bachleitner (born 1965), a well-known Austrian amateur astronomer and astrophotographer	JPL · 172932
172937 Pattysieck	2005 JS_{32}	Patty Alvarado Sieck (b. 1961), an investigator for the State of Colorado Public Defenders Office for 23 years.	IAU172937
172947 Baeyens	2005 JQ_{138}	Dennis A. Baeyens (born 1946), is a molecular biologist who earned a PhD at Michigan State University.	JPL · 172947
172951 Mehoke	2005 JN_{174}	Douglas S. Mehoke (born 1956) is a thermal engineer at the Johns Hopkins University Applied Physics Laboratory, and served as a Thermal Systems Engineer for the New Horizons mission to Pluto.	JPL · 172951
172985 Ericmelin	2006 HW_{147}	Eric D. Melin (born 1977) is a software engineer at the Johns Hopkins University Applied Physics Laboratory, and served as the Ground Systems Lead for the New Horizons mission to Pluto.	JPL · 172985
172989 Xuliyang	2006 KW_{67}	Xu Liyang (born 1989), a friend of Chinese co-discoverer Ye Quan-Zhi	JPL · 172989
172996 Stooke	2006 KL_{141}	Philip John Stooke (born 1952), Canadian geographer, author of the International Atlas of Lunar Exploration	JPL · 172996

back to top

Preceded by 171,001–172,000	Meanings of minor-planet names List of minor planets: 172,001–173,000	Succeeded by 173,001–174,000
