= List of minor planets: 172001–173000 =

The following is a partial list of minor planets, running from minor-planet number 172001 through 173000, inclusive. The primary data for this and other partial lists is based on JPL's "Small-Body Orbital Elements" and data available from the Minor Planet Center. Critical list information is also provided by the MPC, unless otherwise specified from Lowell Observatory. A detailed description of the table's columns and additional sources are given on the main page including a complete list of every page in this series, and a statistical break-up on the dynamical classification of minor planets.

Also see the summary list of all named bodies in numerical and alphabetical order, and the corresponding naming citations for the number range of this particular list. New namings may only be added to this list after official publication, as the preannouncement of names is condemned by the Working Group for Small Bodies Nomenclature of the International Astronomical Union.

Near-Earth obj.	MBA (inner)	MBA (outer)	Centaur
Mars-crosser	MBA (middle)	Jupiter trojan	Trans-Neptunian obj.
Unclassified

== 172001–172100 ==
Designation			Discovery			Properties		Ref
Permanent	Provisional	Named after	Date	Site	Discoverer(s)	Category	Diam.	Ref
172001	2001 UN_{23}	—	October 18, 2001	Socorro	LINEAR	LIX	6.6 km	MPC · JPL
172002	2001 UO_{28}	—	October 16, 2001	Socorro	LINEAR	(43176)	3.9 km	MPC · JPL
172003	2001 UB_{33}	—	October 16, 2001	Socorro	LINEAR	·	5.6 km	MPC · JPL
172004	2001 UD_{38}	—	October 17, 2001	Socorro	LINEAR	·	5.4 km	MPC · JPL
172005	2001 UH_{43}	—	October 17, 2001	Socorro	LINEAR	HYG	3.7 km	MPC · JPL
172006	2001 UT_{51}	—	October 17, 2001	Socorro	LINEAR	·	5.0 km	MPC · JPL
172007	2001 UG_{53}	—	October 17, 2001	Socorro	LINEAR	·	8.3 km	MPC · JPL
172008	2001 UO_{53}	—	October 17, 2001	Socorro	LINEAR	EOS	3.5 km	MPC · JPL
172009	2001 UM_{59}	—	October 17, 2001	Socorro	LINEAR	·	5.4 km	MPC · JPL
172010	2001 US_{62}	—	October 17, 2001	Socorro	LINEAR	EOS	2.5 km	MPC · JPL
172011	2001 UT_{100}	—	October 20, 2001	Socorro	LINEAR	KOR	3.0 km	MPC · JPL
172012	2001 UK_{101}	—	October 20, 2001	Socorro	LINEAR	·	4.3 km	MPC · JPL
172013	2001 UB_{102}	—	October 20, 2001	Socorro	LINEAR	·	3.6 km	MPC · JPL
172014	2001 UX_{103}	—	October 20, 2001	Socorro	LINEAR	·	2.8 km	MPC · JPL
172015	2001 UJ_{105}	—	October 20, 2001	Socorro	LINEAR	EOS	3.7 km	MPC · JPL
172016	2001 UY_{112}	—	October 21, 2001	Socorro	LINEAR	·	4.2 km	MPC · JPL
172017	2001 UA_{125}	—	October 22, 2001	Palomar	NEAT	THB	7.2 km	MPC · JPL
172018	2001 UL_{137}	—	October 23, 2001	Socorro	LINEAR	·	5.3 km	MPC · JPL
172019	2001 UP_{163}	—	October 17, 2001	Socorro	LINEAR	VER	3.8 km	MPC · JPL
172020	2001 UN_{187}	—	October 17, 2001	Palomar	NEAT	EOS	3.1 km	MPC · JPL
172021	2001 UQ_{204}	—	October 19, 2001	Palomar	NEAT	·	6.9 km	MPC · JPL
172022	2001 UZ_{209}	—	October 20, 2001	Haleakala	NEAT	·	5.1 km	MPC · JPL
172023	2001 UV_{211}	—	October 21, 2001	Socorro	LINEAR	·	4.1 km	MPC · JPL
172024	2001 UF_{214}	—	October 23, 2001	Socorro	LINEAR	·	6.0 km	MPC · JPL
172025	2001 UL_{214}	—	October 23, 2001	Socorro	LINEAR	·	5.2 km	MPC · JPL
172026	2001 VF_{1}	—	November 6, 2001	Socorro	LINEAR	·	6.1 km	MPC · JPL
172027	2001 VA_{10}	—	November 10, 2001	Socorro	LINEAR	·	3.9 km	MPC · JPL
172028	2001 VL_{23}	—	November 9, 2001	Socorro	LINEAR	·	2.9 km	MPC · JPL
172029	2001 VP_{39}	—	November 9, 2001	Socorro	LINEAR	·	6.3 km	MPC · JPL
172030	2001 VR_{91}	—	November 15, 2001	Socorro	LINEAR	·	5.9 km	MPC · JPL
172031	2001 VL_{112}	—	November 12, 2001	Socorro	LINEAR	·	4.3 km	MPC · JPL
172032	2001 VW_{132}	—	November 11, 2001	Socorro	LINEAR	·	4.6 km	MPC · JPL
172033	2001 WQ	—	November 16, 2001	Kitt Peak	Spacewatch	THM	5.0 km	MPC · JPL
172034	2001 WR_{1}	—	November 17, 2001	Socorro	LINEAR	AMO +1km	630 m	MPC · JPL
172035	2001 WG_{16}	—	November 17, 2001	Socorro	LINEAR	·	5.4 km	MPC · JPL
172036	2001 WO_{28}	—	November 17, 2001	Socorro	LINEAR	LIX	8.5 km	MPC · JPL
172037	2001 WZ_{32}	—	November 17, 2001	Socorro	LINEAR	·	4.0 km	MPC · JPL
172038	2001 WE_{51}	—	November 19, 2001	Socorro	LINEAR	·	2.7 km	MPC · JPL
172039	2001 WZ_{58}	—	November 19, 2001	Socorro	LINEAR	·	6.3 km	MPC · JPL
172040	2001 WQ_{71}	—	November 20, 2001	Socorro	LINEAR	·	4.1 km	MPC · JPL
172041	2001 WJ_{96}	—	November 17, 2001	Kitt Peak	Spacewatch	·	3.1 km	MPC · JPL
172042	2001 WT_{101}	—	November 18, 2001	Kitt Peak	Spacewatch	·	4.0 km	MPC · JPL
172043	2001 XJ_{9}	—	December 9, 2001	Socorro	LINEAR	THB	5.7 km	MPC · JPL
172044	2001 XZ_{10}	—	December 7, 2001	Socorro	LINEAR	VER	5.9 km	MPC · JPL
172045	2001 XR_{22}	—	December 9, 2001	Socorro	LINEAR	·	5.8 km	MPC · JPL
172046	2001 XA_{51}	—	December 10, 2001	Socorro	LINEAR	TIR	6.8 km	MPC · JPL
172047	2001 XY_{71}	—	December 11, 2001	Socorro	LINEAR	EUP	7.6 km	MPC · JPL
172048	2001 XL_{75}	—	December 11, 2001	Socorro	LINEAR	·	7.4 km	MPC · JPL
172049	2001 XB_{92}	—	December 10, 2001	Socorro	LINEAR	·	3.0 km	MPC · JPL
172050	2001 XE_{110}	—	December 11, 2001	Socorro	LINEAR	·	4.1 km	MPC · JPL
172051	2001 XA_{125}	—	December 14, 2001	Socorro	LINEAR	·	2.2 km	MPC · JPL
172052	2001 XX_{125}	—	December 14, 2001	Socorro	LINEAR	·	5.5 km	MPC · JPL
172053	2001 XH_{131}	—	December 14, 2001	Socorro	LINEAR	·	6.0 km	MPC · JPL
172054	2001 XJ_{132}	—	December 14, 2001	Socorro	LINEAR	·	5.5 km	MPC · JPL
172055	2001 XG_{137}	—	December 14, 2001	Socorro	LINEAR	·	7.1 km	MPC · JPL
172056	2001 XZ_{153}	—	December 14, 2001	Socorro	LINEAR	·	5.4 km	MPC · JPL
172057	2001 XY_{196}	—	December 14, 2001	Socorro	LINEAR	·	6.1 km	MPC · JPL
172058	2001 XN_{201}	—	December 14, 2001	Bergisch Gladbach	W. Bickel	·	4.4 km	MPC · JPL
172059	2001 XL_{203}	—	December 11, 2001	Socorro	LINEAR	·	6.5 km	MPC · JPL
172060	2001 XR_{208}	—	December 11, 2001	Socorro	LINEAR	CYB	7.2 km	MPC · JPL
172061	2001 XH_{223}	—	December 15, 2001	Socorro	LINEAR	EOS	3.0 km	MPC · JPL
172062	2001 XV_{227}	—	December 15, 2001	Socorro	LINEAR	·	4.2 km	MPC · JPL
172063	2001 XP_{237}	—	December 15, 2001	Socorro	LINEAR	·	3.7 km	MPC · JPL
172064	2001 XA_{245}	—	December 15, 2001	Socorro	LINEAR	·	5.8 km	MPC · JPL
172065	2001 XL_{245}	—	December 15, 2001	Socorro	LINEAR	LIX	7.2 km	MPC · JPL
172066	2001 YB_{39}	—	December 18, 2001	Socorro	LINEAR	·	4.0 km	MPC · JPL
172067	2001 YH_{94}	—	December 19, 2001	Kitt Peak	Spacewatch	·	4.4 km	MPC · JPL
172068	2002 AE_{13}	—	January 11, 2002	Campo Imperatore	CINEOS	·	1.2 km	MPC · JPL
172069	2002 AA_{38}	—	January 9, 2002	Socorro	LINEAR	·	6.5 km	MPC · JPL
172070	2002 AR_{70}	—	January 8, 2002	Socorro	LINEAR	HYG	4.7 km	MPC · JPL
172071	2002 AP_{74}	—	January 8, 2002	Socorro	LINEAR	·	5.3 km	MPC · JPL
172072	2002 AF_{81}	—	January 9, 2002	Socorro	LINEAR	·	5.7 km	MPC · JPL
172073	2002 AF_{85}	—	January 9, 2002	Socorro	LINEAR	ARM	6.1 km	MPC · JPL
172074	2002 AQ_{93}	—	January 8, 2002	Socorro	LINEAR	THM	3.4 km	MPC · JPL
172075	2002 AC_{95}	—	January 8, 2002	Socorro	LINEAR	SYL · CYB	7.5 km	MPC · JPL
172076	2002 AS_{199}	—	January 8, 2002	Socorro	LINEAR	·	2.2 km	MPC · JPL
172077	2002 AF_{202}	—	January 12, 2002	Palomar	NEAT	·	1.2 km	MPC · JPL
172078	2002 BL_{16}	—	January 19, 2002	Socorro	LINEAR	·	1.2 km	MPC · JPL
172079	2002 BX_{30}	—	January 18, 2002	Anderson Mesa	LONEOS	CYB	8.3 km	MPC · JPL
172080	2002 CA_{18}	—	February 6, 2002	Socorro	LINEAR	·	1.2 km	MPC · JPL
172081	2002 CA_{35}	—	February 6, 2002	Socorro	LINEAR	·	1.4 km	MPC · JPL
172082	2002 CX_{71}	—	February 7, 2002	Socorro	LINEAR	·	1.1 km	MPC · JPL
172083	2002 CZ_{72}	—	February 7, 2002	Socorro	LINEAR	·	1 km	MPC · JPL
172084	2002 CR_{88}	—	February 7, 2002	Socorro	LINEAR	THM	3.9 km	MPC · JPL
172085	2002 CV_{97}	—	February 7, 2002	Socorro	LINEAR	·	2.1 km	MPC · JPL
172086	2002 CL_{99}	—	February 7, 2002	Socorro	LINEAR	·	1.7 km	MPC · JPL
172087	2002 CS_{170}	—	February 8, 2002	Socorro	LINEAR	NYS	3.0 km	MPC · JPL
172088	2002 CB_{211}	—	February 10, 2002	Socorro	LINEAR	·	930 m	MPC · JPL
172089	2002 CK_{223}	—	February 11, 2002	Socorro	LINEAR	·	930 m	MPC · JPL
172090 Davidmccomas	2002 CL_{257}	Davidmccomas	February 6, 2002	Kitt Peak	M. W. Buie	THM	3.4 km	MPC · JPL
172091	2002 CL_{311}	—	February 11, 2002	Socorro	LINEAR	·	1.2 km	MPC · JPL
172092	2002 EH_{20}	—	March 9, 2002	Socorro	LINEAR	NYS	2.3 km	MPC · JPL
172093	2002 EM_{28}	—	March 9, 2002	Socorro	LINEAR	·	1.2 km	MPC · JPL
172094	2002 EK_{69}	—	March 13, 2002	Socorro	LINEAR	·	1.2 km	MPC · JPL
172095	2002 EP_{79}	—	March 10, 2002	Haleakala	NEAT	·	1.2 km	MPC · JPL
172096	2002 EP_{90}	—	March 12, 2002	Socorro	LINEAR	·	1.5 km	MPC · JPL
172097	2002 EX_{107}	—	March 8, 2002	Ondřejov	Ondrejov	·	940 m	MPC · JPL
172098	2002 EE_{115}	—	March 10, 2002	Anderson Mesa	LONEOS	·	1.1 km	MPC · JPL
172099	2002 ET_{127}	—	March 12, 2002	Palomar	NEAT	·	820 m	MPC · JPL
172100	2002 FO_{8}	—	March 16, 2002	Socorro	LINEAR	·	1.2 km	MPC · JPL

== 172101–172200 ==
back to top

Designation			Discovery			Properties		Ref
Permanent	Provisional	Named after	Date	Site	Discoverer(s)	Category	Diam.	Ref
172101	2002 FR_{14}	—	March 16, 2002	Socorro	LINEAR	·	1.8 km	MPC · JPL
172102	2002 FK_{15}	—	March 16, 2002	Haleakala	NEAT	·	1.3 km	MPC · JPL
172103	2002 FT_{34}	—	March 20, 2002	Anderson Mesa	LONEOS	·	2.2 km	MPC · JPL
172104	2002 GA_{12}	—	April 15, 2002	Desert Eagle	W. K. Y. Yeung	·	1.1 km	MPC · JPL
172105	2002 GB_{18}	—	April 15, 2002	Socorro	LINEAR	·	1.6 km	MPC · JPL
172106	2002 GH_{24}	—	April 13, 2002	Kitt Peak	Spacewatch	·	2.1 km	MPC · JPL
172107	2002 GW_{41}	—	April 4, 2002	Palomar	NEAT	V	990 m	MPC · JPL
172108	2002 GH_{60}	—	April 8, 2002	Kitt Peak	Spacewatch	MAR	1.7 km	MPC · JPL
172109	2002 GP_{72}	—	April 9, 2002	Anderson Mesa	LONEOS	·	3.0 km	MPC · JPL
172110	2002 GV_{79}	—	April 10, 2002	Socorro	LINEAR	·	1.1 km	MPC · JPL
172111	2002 GV_{87}	—	April 10, 2002	Socorro	LINEAR	·	2.0 km	MPC · JPL
172112	2002 GB_{88}	—	April 10, 2002	Socorro	LINEAR	·	1.6 km	MPC · JPL
172113	2002 GA_{93}	—	April 9, 2002	Socorro	LINEAR	BAP	2.3 km	MPC · JPL
172114	2002 GA_{108}	—	April 11, 2002	Socorro	LINEAR	·	2.0 km	MPC · JPL
172115	2002 GH_{112}	—	April 10, 2002	Socorro	LINEAR	·	1.1 km	MPC · JPL
172116	2002 GO_{113}	—	April 11, 2002	Socorro	LINEAR	·	1.5 km	MPC · JPL
172117	2002 GH_{114}	—	April 11, 2002	Socorro	LINEAR	·	1.5 km	MPC · JPL
172118	2002 GN_{114}	—	April 11, 2002	Socorro	LINEAR	·	1.8 km	MPC · JPL
172119	2002 GR_{117}	—	April 11, 2002	Socorro	LINEAR	·	1.6 km	MPC · JPL
172120	2002 GZ_{131}	—	April 12, 2002	Socorro	LINEAR	·	1.2 km	MPC · JPL
172121	2002 GO_{135}	—	April 12, 2002	Socorro	LINEAR	V	1.3 km	MPC · JPL
172122	2002 GD_{151}	—	April 14, 2002	Socorro	LINEAR	·	1.1 km	MPC · JPL
172123	2002 GQ_{168}	—	April 9, 2002	Socorro	LINEAR	·	1.1 km	MPC · JPL
172124	2002 GA_{171}	—	April 10, 2002	Socorro	LINEAR	·	1.8 km	MPC · JPL
172125	2002 HE_{4}	—	April 16, 2002	Socorro	LINEAR	·	1.4 km	MPC · JPL
172126	2002 HV_{4}	—	April 18, 2002	Reedy Creek	J. Broughton	·	1.5 km	MPC · JPL
172127	2002 HD_{10}	—	April 17, 2002	Socorro	LINEAR	·	2.0 km	MPC · JPL
172128	2002 HO_{14}	—	April 16, 2002	Socorro	LINEAR	V	1.1 km	MPC · JPL
172129	2002 HR_{16}	—	April 18, 2002	Palomar	NEAT	·	1.1 km	MPC · JPL
172130	2002 JC_{21}	—	May 8, 2002	Haleakala	NEAT	·	2.4 km	MPC · JPL
172131	2002 JT_{24}	—	May 8, 2002	Socorro	LINEAR	·	2.4 km	MPC · JPL
172132	2002 JE_{34}	—	May 9, 2002	Socorro	LINEAR	·	1.3 km	MPC · JPL
172133	2002 JH_{39}	—	May 10, 2002	Kitt Peak	Spacewatch	·	1.0 km	MPC · JPL
172134	2002 JN_{40}	—	May 8, 2002	Socorro	LINEAR	·	1.8 km	MPC · JPL
172135	2002 JK_{48}	—	May 9, 2002	Socorro	LINEAR	·	1.2 km	MPC · JPL
172136	2002 JP_{56}	—	May 9, 2002	Socorro	LINEAR	NYS	1.4 km	MPC · JPL
172137	2002 JY_{61}	—	May 8, 2002	Socorro	LINEAR	·	2.5 km	MPC · JPL
172138	2002 JK_{64}	—	May 9, 2002	Socorro	LINEAR	NYS	1.6 km	MPC · JPL
172139	2002 JS_{77}	—	May 11, 2002	Socorro	LINEAR	·	1.3 km	MPC · JPL
172140	2002 JP_{78}	—	May 11, 2002	Socorro	LINEAR	V	920 m	MPC · JPL
172141	2002 JT_{79}	—	May 11, 2002	Socorro	LINEAR	·	1.5 km	MPC · JPL
172142	2002 JN_{80}	—	May 11, 2002	Socorro	LINEAR	·	1.1 km	MPC · JPL
172143	2002 JW_{80}	—	May 11, 2002	Socorro	LINEAR	·	1.5 km	MPC · JPL
172144	2002 JO_{101}	—	May 9, 2002	Socorro	LINEAR	·	1.2 km	MPC · JPL
172145	2002 JY_{138}	—	May 9, 2002	Palomar	NEAT	·	2.4 km	MPC · JPL
172146	2002 JJ_{149}	—	May 15, 2002	Palomar	NEAT	PHO	2.0 km	MPC · JPL
172147	2002 KU_{5}	—	May 16, 2002	Socorro	LINEAR	EUN	3.1 km	MPC · JPL
172148	2002 LU_{5}	—	June 4, 2002	Palomar	NEAT	MAS	1.1 km	MPC · JPL
172149	2002 LA_{13}	—	June 5, 2002	Socorro	LINEAR	·	2.7 km	MPC · JPL
172150	2002 LR_{36}	—	June 9, 2002	Socorro	LINEAR	·	3.2 km	MPC · JPL
172151	2002 LL_{43}	—	June 10, 2002	Socorro	LINEAR	·	3.4 km	MPC · JPL
172152	2002 LH_{62}	—	June 12, 2002	Palomar	NEAT	·	2.0 km	MPC · JPL
172153	2002 NK_{6}	—	July 11, 2002	Campo Imperatore	CINEOS	·	1.7 km	MPC · JPL
172154	2002 NR_{13}	—	July 4, 2002	Palomar	NEAT	·	2.4 km	MPC · JPL
172155	2002 NM_{18}	—	July 9, 2002	Socorro	LINEAR	·	4.4 km	MPC · JPL
172156	2002 ND_{22}	—	July 9, 2002	Socorro	LINEAR	·	4.9 km	MPC · JPL
172157	2002 NN_{26}	—	July 9, 2002	Socorro	LINEAR	·	3.6 km	MPC · JPL
172158	2002 NS_{28}	—	July 13, 2002	Palomar	NEAT	·	1.6 km	MPC · JPL
172159	2002 NJ_{30}	—	July 5, 2002	Socorro	LINEAR	·	2.6 km	MPC · JPL
172160	2002 NF_{32}	—	July 13, 2002	Socorro	LINEAR	·	2.2 km	MPC · JPL
172161	2002 NR_{34}	—	July 9, 2002	Socorro	LINEAR	ADE	4.6 km	MPC · JPL
172162	2002 NX_{37}	—	July 9, 2002	Socorro	LINEAR	·	3.4 km	MPC · JPL
172163	2002 NV_{48}	—	July 14, 2002	Socorro	LINEAR	·	3.0 km	MPC · JPL
172164	2002 NR_{52}	—	July 14, 2002	Palomar	NEAT	·	2.3 km	MPC · JPL
172165	2002 NL_{53}	—	July 14, 2002	Palomar	NEAT	(5)	2.5 km	MPC · JPL
172166	2002 NU_{56}	—	July 1, 2002	Lake Tekapo	Tristram, P. J.	·	2.6 km	MPC · JPL
172167	2002 NK_{61}	—	July 5, 2002	Socorro	LINEAR	·	2.2 km	MPC · JPL
172168	2002 OA_{1}	—	July 17, 2002	Socorro	LINEAR	EUN	2.0 km	MPC · JPL
172169	2002 OY_{2}	—	July 17, 2002	Socorro	LINEAR	·	3.5 km	MPC · JPL
172170	2002 OE_{4}	—	July 17, 2002	Socorro	LINEAR	ADE	4.7 km	MPC · JPL
172171	2002 PT	—	August 2, 2002	Campo Imperatore	CINEOS	·	2.7 km	MPC · JPL
172172	2002 PU_{23}	—	August 6, 2002	Palomar	NEAT	V	1.1 km	MPC · JPL
172173	2002 PW_{24}	—	August 6, 2002	Palomar	NEAT	·	1.8 km	MPC · JPL
172174	2002 PW_{26}	—	August 6, 2002	Palomar	NEAT	(5)	2.0 km	MPC · JPL
172175	2002 PP_{36}	—	August 6, 2002	Palomar	NEAT	·	2.2 km	MPC · JPL
172176	2002 PH_{41}	—	August 4, 2002	Socorro	LINEAR	EUN	1.9 km	MPC · JPL
172177	2002 PS_{42}	—	August 5, 2002	Socorro	LINEAR	·	2.9 km	MPC · JPL
172178	2002 PU_{43}	—	August 5, 2002	Socorro	LINEAR	·	3.9 km	MPC · JPL
172179	2002 PK_{47}	—	August 10, 2002	Socorro	LINEAR	H	690 m	MPC · JPL
172180	2002 PR_{48}	—	August 10, 2002	Socorro	LINEAR	·	3.4 km	MPC · JPL
172181	2002 PW_{48}	—	August 10, 2002	Socorro	LINEAR	·	2.6 km	MPC · JPL
172182	2002 PK_{74}	—	August 12, 2002	Socorro	LINEAR	·	3.0 km	MPC · JPL
172183	2002 PZ_{74}	—	August 12, 2002	Socorro	LINEAR	·	2.6 km	MPC · JPL
172184	2002 PT_{83}	—	August 10, 2002	Socorro	LINEAR	·	3.2 km	MPC · JPL
172185	2002 PS_{104}	—	August 12, 2002	Socorro	LINEAR	·	3.7 km	MPC · JPL
172186	2002 PK_{108}	—	August 13, 2002	Socorro	LINEAR	·	2.6 km	MPC · JPL
172187	2002 PX_{112}	—	August 12, 2002	Socorro	LINEAR	·	2.9 km	MPC · JPL
172188	2002 PD_{117}	—	August 14, 2002	Anderson Mesa	LONEOS	·	4.3 km	MPC · JPL
172189	2002 PA_{122}	—	August 13, 2002	Anderson Mesa	LONEOS	·	1.8 km	MPC · JPL
172190	2002 PQ_{126}	—	August 14, 2002	Socorro	LINEAR	·	2.5 km	MPC · JPL
172191 Ralphmcnutt	2002 PH_{152}	Ralphmcnutt	August 10, 2002	Cerro Tololo	M. W. Buie	·	2.7 km	MPC · JPL
172192	2002 PB_{156}	—	August 8, 2002	Palomar	S. F. Hönig	·	3.5 km	MPC · JPL
172193	2002 PA_{160}	—	August 8, 2002	Palomar	S. F. Hönig	·	1.5 km	MPC · JPL
172194	2002 PD_{162}	—	August 8, 2002	Palomar	S. F. Hönig	·	1.8 km	MPC · JPL
172195	2002 QK_{9}	—	August 19, 2002	Palomar	NEAT	·	3.0 km	MPC · JPL
172196	2002 QT_{12}	—	August 26, 2002	Palomar	NEAT	·	2.0 km	MPC · JPL
172197	2002 QF_{19}	—	August 26, 2002	Palomar	NEAT	(5)	1.8 km	MPC · JPL
172198	2002 QF_{20}	—	August 28, 2002	Palomar	NEAT	·	3.4 km	MPC · JPL
172199	2002 QK_{24}	—	August 29, 2002	Palomar	NEAT	ADE	4.3 km	MPC · JPL
172200	2002 QO_{28}	—	August 29, 2002	Palomar	NEAT	·	2.3 km	MPC · JPL

== 172201–172300 ==
back to top

Designation			Discovery			Properties		Ref
Permanent	Provisional	Named after	Date	Site	Discoverer(s)	Category	Diam.	Ref
172201	2002 QU_{30}	—	August 29, 2002	Palomar	NEAT	·	2.0 km	MPC · JPL
172202	2002 QL_{34}	—	August 29, 2002	Palomar	NEAT	·	1.7 km	MPC · JPL
172203	2002 QZ_{36}	—	August 30, 2002	Kitt Peak	Spacewatch	·	1.9 km	MPC · JPL
172204	2002 QR_{52}	—	August 29, 2002	Palomar	S. F. Hönig	·	4.7 km	MPC · JPL
172205	2002 QT_{52}	—	August 29, 2002	Palomar	S. F. Hönig	·	1.9 km	MPC · JPL
172206	2002 QQ_{54}	—	August 29, 2002	Palomar	S. F. Hönig	·	1.6 km	MPC · JPL
172207	2002 QN_{68}	—	August 18, 2002	Palomar	NEAT	·	2.4 km	MPC · JPL
172208	2002 QH_{74}	—	August 28, 2002	Palomar	NEAT	·	1.5 km	MPC · JPL
172209	2002 QG_{75}	—	August 28, 2002	Palomar	NEAT	·	1.3 km	MPC · JPL
172210	2002 QF_{77}	—	August 29, 2002	Palomar	NEAT	·	2.1 km	MPC · JPL
172211	2002 QE_{84}	—	August 27, 2002	Palomar	NEAT	·	2.2 km	MPC · JPL
172212	2002 QW_{89}	—	August 27, 2002	Palomar	NEAT	·	2.0 km	MPC · JPL
172213	2002 QA_{110}	—	August 17, 2002	Palomar	NEAT	·	1.8 km	MPC · JPL
172214	2002 QV_{115}	—	August 29, 2002	Palomar	NEAT	·	2.0 km	MPC · JPL
172215	2002 RL_{26}	—	September 4, 2002	Palomar	NEAT	·	4.6 km	MPC · JPL
172216	2002 RF_{44}	—	September 5, 2002	Socorro	LINEAR	·	3.2 km	MPC · JPL
172217	2002 RK_{44}	—	September 5, 2002	Socorro	LINEAR	·	2.3 km	MPC · JPL
172218	2002 RG_{47}	—	September 5, 2002	Socorro	LINEAR	ADE	4.3 km	MPC · JPL
172219	2002 RR_{47}	—	September 5, 2002	Socorro	LINEAR	·	2.5 km	MPC · JPL
172220	2002 RZ_{57}	—	September 5, 2002	Anderson Mesa	LONEOS	·	1.9 km	MPC · JPL
172221	2002 RP_{59}	—	September 5, 2002	Socorro	LINEAR	·	3.6 km	MPC · JPL
172222	2002 RH_{60}	—	September 5, 2002	Socorro	LINEAR	·	2.9 km	MPC · JPL
172223	2002 RP_{66}	—	September 3, 2002	Palomar	NEAT	EUN	2.7 km	MPC · JPL
172224	2002 RU_{88}	—	September 5, 2002	Socorro	LINEAR	·	2.3 km	MPC · JPL
172225	2002 RS_{90}	—	September 5, 2002	Socorro	LINEAR	·	3.5 km	MPC · JPL
172226	2002 RB_{97}	—	September 5, 2002	Socorro	LINEAR	·	3.4 km	MPC · JPL
172227	2002 RG_{109}	—	September 6, 2002	Socorro	LINEAR	·	3.6 km	MPC · JPL
172228	2002 RJ_{113}	—	September 5, 2002	Socorro	LINEAR	·	2.5 km	MPC · JPL
172229	2002 RT_{113}	—	September 5, 2002	Socorro	LINEAR	KOR	2.2 km	MPC · JPL
172230	2002 RZ_{113}	—	September 5, 2002	Socorro	LINEAR	·	2.8 km	MPC · JPL
172231	2002 RZ_{127}	—	September 10, 2002	Palomar	NEAT	EUN	1.7 km	MPC · JPL
172232	2002 RL_{131}	—	September 11, 2002	Palomar	NEAT	ADE	3.5 km	MPC · JPL
172233	2002 RB_{141}	—	September 10, 2002	Palomar	NEAT	MAR	1.9 km	MPC · JPL
172234	2002 RS_{142}	—	September 11, 2002	Palomar	NEAT	WIT	1.3 km	MPC · JPL
172235	2002 RF_{149}	—	September 11, 2002	Haleakala	NEAT	MAR	1.6 km	MPC · JPL
172236	2002 RH_{173}	—	September 13, 2002	Socorro	LINEAR	DOR	5.4 km	MPC · JPL
172237	2002 RG_{178}	—	September 13, 2002	Kitt Peak	Spacewatch	·	2.6 km	MPC · JPL
172238	2002 RY_{179}	—	September 14, 2002	Kitt Peak	Spacewatch	·	3.5 km	MPC · JPL
172239	2002 RO_{182}	—	September 11, 2002	Palomar	NEAT	·	3.4 km	MPC · JPL
172240	2002 RO_{191}	—	September 12, 2002	Palomar	NEAT	·	2.4 km	MPC · JPL
172241	2002 RT_{196}	—	September 12, 2002	Haleakala	NEAT	(5)	1.8 km	MPC · JPL
172242	2002 RA_{200}	—	September 13, 2002	Palomar	NEAT	·	2.5 km	MPC · JPL
172243	2002 RT_{202}	—	September 13, 2002	Palomar	NEAT	·	3.5 km	MPC · JPL
172244	2002 RG_{206}	—	September 14, 2002	Palomar	NEAT	NEM	3.5 km	MPC · JPL
172245	2002 RV_{206}	—	September 14, 2002	Palomar	NEAT	·	1.8 km	MPC · JPL
172246	2002 RS_{223}	—	September 13, 2002	Haleakala	NEAT	·	3.4 km	MPC · JPL
172247	2002 RF_{224}	—	September 13, 2002	Anderson Mesa	LONEOS	·	6.2 km	MPC · JPL
172248	2002 RV_{225}	—	September 13, 2002	Palomar	NEAT	·	3.8 km	MPC · JPL
172249	2002 RG_{226}	—	September 13, 2002	Haleakala	NEAT	MIS	3.7 km	MPC · JPL
172250	2002 RR_{232}	—	September 11, 2002	Palomar	White, M., M. Collins	·	1.9 km	MPC · JPL
172251	2002 RR_{237}	—	September 15, 2002	Palomar	R. Matson	·	1.9 km	MPC · JPL
172252	2002 RR_{263}	—	September 13, 2002	Palomar	NEAT	·	1.6 km	MPC · JPL
172253	2002 RC_{271}	—	September 1, 2002	Haleakala	NEAT	·	2.2 km	MPC · JPL
172254	2002 SY_{8}	—	September 27, 2002	Palomar	NEAT	·	2.3 km	MPC · JPL
172255	2002 SQ_{9}	—	September 27, 2002	Palomar	NEAT	PAD	2.4 km	MPC · JPL
172256	2002 SN_{11}	—	September 27, 2002	Palomar	NEAT	·	2.6 km	MPC · JPL
172257	2002 SD_{16}	—	September 27, 2002	Palomar	NEAT	·	2.9 km	MPC · JPL
172258	2002 SG_{23}	—	September 27, 2002	Palomar	NEAT	AST	3.8 km	MPC · JPL
172259	2002 SF_{26}	—	September 28, 2002	Haleakala	NEAT	·	2.4 km	MPC · JPL
172260	2002 SN_{40}	—	September 30, 2002	Haleakala	NEAT	·	3.0 km	MPC · JPL
172261	2002 SN_{51}	—	September 16, 2002	Palomar	NEAT	(5)	2.1 km	MPC · JPL
172262	2002 SK_{54}	—	September 30, 2002	Socorro	LINEAR	GEF	2.1 km	MPC · JPL
172263	2002 SF_{61}	—	September 16, 2002	Palomar	NEAT	·	2.9 km	MPC · JPL
172264	2002 TW_{15}	—	October 2, 2002	Socorro	LINEAR	AGN	2.3 km	MPC · JPL
172265	2002 TW_{21}	—	October 2, 2002	Socorro	LINEAR	WIT	1.9 km	MPC · JPL
172266	2002 TM_{23}	—	October 2, 2002	Socorro	LINEAR	·	2.7 km	MPC · JPL
172267	2002 TP_{29}	—	October 2, 2002	Socorro	LINEAR	AEO	2.1 km	MPC · JPL
172268	2002 TE_{64}	—	October 4, 2002	Socorro	LINEAR	·	2.4 km	MPC · JPL
172269 Tator	2002 TJ_{69}	Tator	October 9, 2002	Mülheim-Ruhr	Martin, A., Boeker, A.	·	3.5 km	MPC · JPL
172270	2002 TN_{70}	—	October 3, 2002	Palomar	NEAT	EUN	2.4 km	MPC · JPL
172271	2002 TW_{79}	—	October 1, 2002	Socorro	LINEAR	·	3.9 km	MPC · JPL
172272	2002 TP_{83}	—	October 2, 2002	Haleakala	NEAT	·	3.2 km	MPC · JPL
172273	2002 TP_{89}	—	October 3, 2002	Palomar	NEAT	·	2.5 km	MPC · JPL
172274	2002 TD_{98}	—	October 3, 2002	Socorro	LINEAR	·	2.3 km	MPC · JPL
172275	2002 TO_{108}	—	October 1, 2002	Haleakala	NEAT	·	3.2 km	MPC · JPL
172276	2002 TP_{111}	—	October 3, 2002	Socorro	LINEAR	BRA	2.3 km	MPC · JPL
172277	2002 TU_{111}	—	October 3, 2002	Socorro	LINEAR	·	2.4 km	MPC · JPL
172278	2002 TU_{112}	—	October 3, 2002	Socorro	LINEAR	·	2.4 km	MPC · JPL
172279	2002 TO_{121}	—	October 3, 2002	Palomar	NEAT	·	3.2 km	MPC · JPL
172280	2002 TM_{124}	—	October 4, 2002	Palomar	NEAT	EOS	7.3 km	MPC · JPL
172281	2002 TD_{133}	—	October 4, 2002	Socorro	LINEAR	V	1.5 km	MPC · JPL
172282	2002 TJ_{134}	—	October 4, 2002	Palomar	NEAT	·	4.9 km	MPC · JPL
172283	2002 TU_{137}	—	October 4, 2002	Anderson Mesa	LONEOS	·	6.2 km	MPC · JPL
172284	2002 TO_{138}	—	October 4, 2002	Anderson Mesa	LONEOS	·	4.4 km	MPC · JPL
172285	2002 TX_{138}	—	October 4, 2002	Anderson Mesa	LONEOS	EOS	3.9 km	MPC · JPL
172286	2002 TL_{139}	—	October 4, 2002	Anderson Mesa	LONEOS	·	4.0 km	MPC · JPL
172287	2002 TE_{144}	—	October 5, 2002	Socorro	LINEAR	·	1.5 km	MPC · JPL
172288	2002 TO_{156}	—	October 5, 2002	Palomar	NEAT	WIT	1.4 km	MPC · JPL
172289	2002 TS_{164}	—	October 5, 2002	Palomar	NEAT	·	3.7 km	MPC · JPL
172290	2002 TW_{166}	—	October 3, 2002	Palomar	NEAT	·	3.9 km	MPC · JPL
172291	2002 TH_{174}	—	October 4, 2002	Socorro	LINEAR	·	3.8 km	MPC · JPL
172292	2002 TR_{177}	—	October 11, 2002	Palomar	NEAT	·	3.9 km	MPC · JPL
172293	2002 TD_{178}	—	October 11, 2002	Palomar	NEAT	BRA	4.7 km	MPC · JPL
172294	2002 TQ_{179}	—	October 13, 2002	Palomar	NEAT	EUN	1.6 km	MPC · JPL
172295	2002 TC_{195}	—	October 3, 2002	Socorro	LINEAR	·	3.2 km	MPC · JPL
172296	2002 TV_{195}	—	October 3, 2002	Socorro	LINEAR	BRA	2.2 km	MPC · JPL
172297	2002 TU_{199}	—	October 6, 2002	Anderson Mesa	LONEOS	·	2.6 km	MPC · JPL
172298	2002 TD_{213}	—	October 3, 2002	Socorro	LINEAR	·	2.7 km	MPC · JPL
172299	2002 TD_{217}	—	October 7, 2002	Palomar	NEAT	HOF	4.3 km	MPC · JPL
172300	2002 TE_{228}	—	October 6, 2002	Haleakala	NEAT	·	3.7 km	MPC · JPL

== 172301–172400 ==
back to top

Designation			Discovery			Properties		Ref
Permanent	Provisional	Named after	Date	Site	Discoverer(s)	Category	Diam.	Ref
172301	2002 TM_{234}	—	October 6, 2002	Socorro	LINEAR	·	4.1 km	MPC · JPL
172302	2002 TY_{235}	—	October 6, 2002	Socorro	LINEAR	MAR	2.1 km	MPC · JPL
172303	2002 TZ_{235}	—	October 6, 2002	Socorro	LINEAR	·	3.8 km	MPC · JPL
172304	2002 TC_{238}	—	October 7, 2002	Socorro	LINEAR	EUN	2.1 km	MPC · JPL
172305	2002 TY_{239}	—	October 9, 2002	Socorro	LINEAR	EUN	2.1 km	MPC · JPL
172306	2002 TV_{250}	—	October 7, 2002	Anderson Mesa	LONEOS	(21344)	2.8 km	MPC · JPL
172307	2002 TT_{262}	—	October 10, 2002	Palomar	NEAT	·	3.2 km	MPC · JPL
172308	2002 TQ_{267}	—	October 8, 2002	Anderson Mesa	LONEOS	·	3.5 km	MPC · JPL
172309	2002 TU_{268}	—	October 9, 2002	Socorro	LINEAR	·	3.5 km	MPC · JPL
172310	2002 TL_{273}	—	October 9, 2002	Socorro	LINEAR	·	2.5 km	MPC · JPL
172311	2002 TO_{275}	—	October 9, 2002	Socorro	LINEAR	GEF	2.5 km	MPC · JPL
172312	2002 TO_{284}	—	October 10, 2002	Socorro	LINEAR	EOS	3.6 km	MPC · JPL
172313	2002 TM_{286}	—	October 10, 2002	Socorro	LINEAR	GEF · fast	2.2 km	MPC · JPL
172314	2002 TR_{290}	—	October 10, 2002	Socorro	LINEAR	·	3.2 km	MPC · JPL
172315 Changqiaoxiaoxue	2002 TL_{300}	Changqiaoxiaoxue	October 15, 2002	Palomar	NEAT	·	3.4 km	MPC · JPL
172316	2002 TD_{303}	—	October 11, 2002	Socorro	LINEAR	·	1.9 km	MPC · JPL
172317 Walterbos	2002 TZ_{315}	Walterbos	October 4, 2002	Apache Point	SDSS	·	3.2 km	MPC · JPL
172318 Wangshui	2002 TY_{342}	Wangshui	October 5, 2002	Apache Point	SDSS	·	3.3 km	MPC · JPL
172319	2002 TR_{375}	—	October 3, 2002	Socorro	LINEAR	·	3.0 km	MPC · JPL
172320	2002 TZ_{377}	—	October 15, 2002	Palomar	NEAT	·	3.3 km	MPC · JPL
172321	2002 UY_{5}	—	October 28, 2002	Palomar	NEAT	WIT	1.8 km	MPC · JPL
172322	2002 UQ_{22}	—	October 30, 2002	Haleakala	NEAT	·	3.5 km	MPC · JPL
172323	2002 UP_{23}	—	October 28, 2002	Palomar	NEAT	·	2.3 km	MPC · JPL
172324	2002 UM_{26}	—	October 31, 2002	Socorro	LINEAR	·	3.1 km	MPC · JPL
172325	2002 UW_{32}	—	October 31, 2002	Kvistaberg	Uppsala-DLR Asteroid Survey	·	1.8 km	MPC · JPL
172326	2002 UL_{47}	—	October 31, 2002	Socorro	LINEAR	·	2.7 km	MPC · JPL
172327	2002 VF	—	November 1, 2002	Socorro	LINEAR	·	3.5 km	MPC · JPL
172328	2002 VV_{3}	—	November 1, 2002	Palomar	NEAT	·	3.7 km	MPC · JPL
172329	2002 VE_{16}	—	November 4, 2002	Kitt Peak	Spacewatch	AGN	1.7 km	MPC · JPL
172330	2002 VH_{18}	—	November 2, 2002	Haleakala	NEAT	fast	3.1 km	MPC · JPL
172331	2002 VS_{19}	—	November 4, 2002	Fountain Hills	Hills, Fountain	·	3.7 km	MPC · JPL
172332	2002 VW_{19}	—	November 4, 2002	Kitt Peak	Spacewatch	·	2.1 km	MPC · JPL
172333	2002 VH_{23}	—	November 5, 2002	Socorro	LINEAR	NEM	3.7 km	MPC · JPL
172334	2002 VB_{25}	—	November 5, 2002	Socorro	LINEAR	·	3.3 km	MPC · JPL
172335	2002 VO_{32}	—	November 5, 2002	Socorro	LINEAR	GEF	2.2 km	MPC · JPL
172336	2002 VE_{37}	—	November 2, 2002	Haleakala	NEAT	·	3.6 km	MPC · JPL
172337	2002 VR_{38}	—	November 5, 2002	Socorro	LINEAR	LEO	2.4 km	MPC · JPL
172338	2002 VX_{43}	—	November 4, 2002	Kitt Peak	Spacewatch	·	3.6 km	MPC · JPL
172339	2002 VL_{57}	—	November 6, 2002	Haleakala	NEAT	EUN	2.3 km	MPC · JPL
172340	2002 VN_{74}	—	November 7, 2002	Socorro	LINEAR	·	3.6 km	MPC · JPL
172341	2002 VZ_{85}	—	November 11, 2002	Socorro	LINEAR	·	5.0 km	MPC · JPL
172342	2002 VQ_{92}	—	November 11, 2002	Socorro	LINEAR	·	5.1 km	MPC · JPL
172343	2002 VC_{97}	—	November 12, 2002	Anderson Mesa	LONEOS	·	3.4 km	MPC · JPL
172344	2002 VL_{104}	—	November 12, 2002	Socorro	LINEAR	EOS	2.9 km	MPC · JPL
172345	2002 VR_{105}	—	November 12, 2002	Socorro	LINEAR	·	4.3 km	MPC · JPL
172346	2002 VK_{106}	—	November 12, 2002	Socorro	LINEAR	·	3.6 km	MPC · JPL
172347	2002 VL_{108}	—	November 12, 2002	Socorro	LINEAR	·	4.6 km	MPC · JPL
172348	2002 VU_{113}	—	November 13, 2002	Palomar	NEAT	·	2.3 km	MPC · JPL
172349	2002 VO_{122}	—	November 13, 2002	Palomar	NEAT	GEF	2.4 km	MPC · JPL
172350	2002 VN_{123}	—	November 14, 2002	Palomar	NEAT	EUN	2.4 km	MPC · JPL
172351	2002 VG_{126}	—	November 12, 2002	Socorro	LINEAR	·	3.7 km	MPC · JPL
172352	2002 VG_{127}	—	November 14, 2002	Socorro	LINEAR	·	3.1 km	MPC · JPL
172353	2002 VR_{133}	—	November 5, 2002	Anderson Mesa	LONEOS	·	4.2 km	MPC · JPL
172354	2002 WY_{7}	—	November 24, 2002	Palomar	NEAT	·	2.7 km	MPC · JPL
172355	2002 XM	—	December 1, 2002	Socorro	LINEAR	·	4.2 km	MPC · JPL
172356	2002 XG_{7}	—	December 2, 2002	Socorro	LINEAR	·	3.5 km	MPC · JPL
172357	2002 XC_{12}	—	December 3, 2002	Palomar	NEAT	·	4.8 km	MPC · JPL
172358	2002 XS_{12}	—	December 3, 2002	Palomar	NEAT	EOS	2.9 km	MPC · JPL
172359	2002 XE_{16}	—	December 3, 2002	Palomar	NEAT	·	4.3 km	MPC · JPL
172360	2002 XM_{39}	—	December 9, 2002	Desert Eagle	W. K. Y. Yeung	EOS	3.0 km	MPC · JPL
172361	2002 XK_{51}	—	December 10, 2002	Socorro	LINEAR	·	5.4 km	MPC · JPL
172362	2002 XM_{55}	—	December 10, 2002	Palomar	NEAT	·	5.1 km	MPC · JPL
172363	2002 XK_{60}	—	December 10, 2002	Socorro	LINEAR	HOF	3.8 km	MPC · JPL
172364	2002 XV_{63}	—	December 11, 2002	Socorro	LINEAR	·	4.3 km	MPC · JPL
172365	2002 XR_{64}	—	December 11, 2002	Socorro	LINEAR	·	6.3 km	MPC · JPL
172366	2002 XB_{71}	—	December 10, 2002	Socorro	LINEAR	·	3.7 km	MPC · JPL
172367	2002 XL_{72}	—	December 11, 2002	Socorro	LINEAR	·	3.4 km	MPC · JPL
172368	2002 XC_{74}	—	December 11, 2002	Socorro	LINEAR	·	4.5 km	MPC · JPL
172369	2002 XF_{85}	—	December 11, 2002	Socorro	LINEAR	BRA	2.8 km	MPC · JPL
172370	2002 XL_{85}	—	December 11, 2002	Socorro	LINEAR	·	7.9 km	MPC · JPL
172371	2002 XB_{93}	—	December 5, 2002	Socorro	LINEAR	·	2.7 km	MPC · JPL
172372	2002 XO_{95}	—	December 5, 2002	Socorro	LINEAR	·	3.2 km	MPC · JPL
172373	2002 XX_{101}	—	December 5, 2002	Socorro	LINEAR	·	2.7 km	MPC · JPL
172374	2002 XB_{107}	—	December 5, 2002	Socorro	LINEAR	·	2.8 km	MPC · JPL
172375	2002 YH_{13}	—	December 31, 2002	Socorro	LINEAR	THM	3.4 km	MPC · JPL
172376	2002 YE_{25}	—	December 31, 2002	Socorro	LINEAR	·	5.6 km	MPC · JPL
172377	2002 YT_{34}	—	December 31, 2002	Socorro	LINEAR	·	4.9 km	MPC · JPL
172378	2002 YK_{35}	—	December 31, 2002	Socorro	LINEAR	·	4.8 km	MPC · JPL
172379	2003 AO_{7}	—	January 2, 2003	Socorro	LINEAR	·	4.9 km	MPC · JPL
172380	2003 AH_{10}	—	January 1, 2003	Socorro	LINEAR	·	3.7 km	MPC · JPL
172381	2003 AY_{10}	—	January 1, 2003	Socorro	LINEAR	·	3.6 km	MPC · JPL
172382	2003 AD_{11}	—	January 1, 2003	Socorro	LINEAR	·	4.2 km	MPC · JPL
172383	2003 AW_{15}	—	January 4, 2003	Socorro	LINEAR	·	3.8 km	MPC · JPL
172384	2003 AF_{21}	—	January 5, 2003	Socorro	LINEAR	EOS	3.2 km	MPC · JPL
172385	2003 AN_{21}	—	January 5, 2003	Socorro	LINEAR	·	4.4 km	MPC · JPL
172386	2003 AO_{35}	—	January 7, 2003	Socorro	LINEAR	·	6.2 km	MPC · JPL
172387	2003 AZ_{37}	—	January 7, 2003	Socorro	LINEAR	·	6.6 km	MPC · JPL
172388	2003 AG_{45}	—	January 5, 2003	Socorro	LINEAR	·	3.3 km	MPC · JPL
172389	2003 AX_{50}	—	January 5, 2003	Socorro	LINEAR	·	4.5 km	MPC · JPL
172390	2003 AO_{52}	—	January 5, 2003	Socorro	LINEAR	·	3.4 km	MPC · JPL
172391	2003 AG_{54}	—	January 5, 2003	Socorro	LINEAR	·	3.6 km	MPC · JPL
172392	2003 AA_{55}	—	January 5, 2003	Socorro	LINEAR	URS	5.6 km	MPC · JPL
172393	2003 AK_{68}	—	January 8, 2003	Socorro	LINEAR	·	5.0 km	MPC · JPL
172394	2003 AL_{78}	—	January 10, 2003	Socorro	LINEAR	·	5.4 km	MPC · JPL
172395	2003 AN_{84}	—	January 11, 2003	Goodricke-Pigott	R. A. Tucker	LIX	4.7 km	MPC · JPL
172396	2003 BV_{6}	—	January 25, 2003	Anderson Mesa	LONEOS	·	3.4 km	MPC · JPL
172397	2003 BR_{14}	—	January 26, 2003	Haleakala	NEAT	·	4.8 km	MPC · JPL
172398	2003 BT_{20}	—	January 27, 2003	Socorro	LINEAR	·	4.3 km	MPC · JPL
172399	2003 BC_{22}	—	January 25, 2003	Palomar	NEAT	·	5.2 km	MPC · JPL
172400	2003 BH_{22}	—	January 25, 2003	Anderson Mesa	LONEOS	EOS	2.6 km	MPC · JPL

== 172401–172500 ==
back to top

Designation			Discovery			Properties		Ref
Permanent	Provisional	Named after	Date	Site	Discoverer(s)	Category	Diam.	Ref
172401	2003 BG_{24}	—	January 25, 2003	Palomar	NEAT	TIR	4.3 km	MPC · JPL
172402	2003 BJ_{51}	—	January 27, 2003	Socorro	LINEAR	·	4.9 km	MPC · JPL
172403	2003 BO_{52}	—	January 27, 2003	Socorro	LINEAR	·	4.2 km	MPC · JPL
172404	2003 BC_{53}	—	January 27, 2003	Anderson Mesa	LONEOS	EOS	3.2 km	MPC · JPL
172405	2003 BH_{65}	—	January 30, 2003	Palomar	NEAT	·	4.1 km	MPC · JPL
172406	2003 BY_{67}	—	January 27, 2003	Socorro	LINEAR	·	3.3 km	MPC · JPL
172407	2003 BN_{69}	—	January 30, 2003	Anderson Mesa	LONEOS	·	4.4 km	MPC · JPL
172408	2003 BL_{75}	—	January 29, 2003	Palomar	NEAT	·	4.9 km	MPC · JPL
172409	2003 BJ_{77}	—	January 30, 2003	Anderson Mesa	LONEOS	THM	3.3 km	MPC · JPL
172410	2003 CB_{2}	—	February 1, 2003	Anderson Mesa	LONEOS	EUP	8.4 km	MPC · JPL
172411	2003 CM_{14}	—	February 3, 2003	Palomar	NEAT	·	4.5 km	MPC · JPL
172412	2003 DC_{13}	—	February 26, 2003	Kleť	M. Tichý, Kočer, M.	·	7.0 km	MPC · JPL
172413	2003 EH_{2}	—	March 5, 2003	Socorro	LINEAR	HYG	4.7 km	MPC · JPL
172414	2003 EW_{14}	—	March 6, 2003	Socorro	LINEAR	·	4.5 km	MPC · JPL
172415	2003 EZ_{39}	—	March 8, 2003	Socorro	LINEAR	·	4.1 km	MPC · JPL
172416	2003 FV_{5}	—	March 26, 2003	Campo Imperatore	CINEOS	CYB	6.4 km	MPC · JPL
172417	2003 FW_{37}	—	March 23, 2003	Kitt Peak	Spacewatch	·	2.2 km	MPC · JPL
172418	2003 FV_{106}	—	March 27, 2003	Anderson Mesa	LONEOS	EUP	9.5 km	MPC · JPL
172419	2003 GD_{21}	—	April 4, 2003	Uccle	Uccle	H	970 m	MPC · JPL
172420	2003 GM_{48}	—	April 9, 2003	Palomar	NEAT	CYB	4.9 km	MPC · JPL
172421	2003 HF	—	April 23, 2003	Socorro	LINEAR	·	2.2 km	MPC · JPL
172422	2003 OW_{13}	—	July 28, 2003	Reedy Creek	J. Broughton	·	1.1 km	MPC · JPL
172423	2003 OK_{16}	—	July 26, 2003	Campo Imperatore	CINEOS	·	1.9 km	MPC · JPL
172424	2003 OU_{17}	—	July 29, 2003	Reedy Creek	J. Broughton	·	870 m	MPC · JPL
172425 Taliajacobi	2003 OJ_{18}	Taliajacobi	July 25, 2003	Wise	Polishook, D.	·	1.9 km	MPC · JPL
172426	2003 OJ_{31}	—	July 30, 2003	Socorro	LINEAR	·	1.9 km	MPC · JPL
172427	2003 PF_{4}	—	August 2, 2003	Haleakala	NEAT	·	1.9 km	MPC · JPL
172428	2003 PX_{9}	—	August 1, 2003	Socorro	LINEAR	·	1.6 km	MPC · JPL
172429	2003 QN_{1}	—	August 19, 2003	Campo Imperatore	CINEOS	·	1.5 km	MPC · JPL
172430 Sergiofonti	2003 QL_{8}	Sergiofonti	August 20, 2003	Campo Imperatore	CINEOS	V	1.1 km	MPC · JPL
172431	2003 QO_{16}	—	August 20, 2003	Campo Imperatore	CINEOS	·	1.6 km	MPC · JPL
172432	2003 QD_{18}	—	August 22, 2003	Palomar	NEAT	NYS	1.4 km	MPC · JPL
172433	2003 QN_{22}	—	August 20, 2003	Palomar	NEAT	·	1.4 km	MPC · JPL
172434	2003 QG_{24}	—	August 21, 2003	Palomar	NEAT	·	1.4 km	MPC · JPL
172435	2003 QX_{24}	—	August 22, 2003	Palomar	NEAT	·	990 m	MPC · JPL
172436	2003 QE_{25}	—	August 22, 2003	Palomar	NEAT	·	2.1 km	MPC · JPL
172437	2003 QO_{37}	—	August 22, 2003	Palomar	NEAT	·	1.7 km	MPC · JPL
172438	2003 QW_{37}	—	August 22, 2003	Socorro	LINEAR	·	1.3 km	MPC · JPL
172439	2003 QP_{40}	—	August 22, 2003	Socorro	LINEAR	V	1.4 km	MPC · JPL
172440	2003 QE_{42}	—	August 22, 2003	Socorro	LINEAR	NYS	2.2 km	MPC · JPL
172441	2003 QR_{45}	—	August 23, 2003	Palomar	NEAT	·	1.4 km	MPC · JPL
172442	2003 QC_{48}	—	August 20, 2003	Palomar	NEAT	V	790 m	MPC · JPL
172443	2003 QX_{52}	—	August 23, 2003	Socorro	LINEAR	·	1.0 km	MPC · JPL
172444	2003 QN_{55}	—	August 23, 2003	Socorro	LINEAR	NYS	1.7 km	MPC · JPL
172445	2003 QM_{57}	—	August 23, 2003	Socorro	LINEAR	·	1.3 km	MPC · JPL
172446	2003 QN_{58}	—	August 23, 2003	Palomar	NEAT	MAS	1.1 km	MPC · JPL
172447	2003 QX_{59}	—	August 23, 2003	Socorro	LINEAR	·	2.0 km	MPC · JPL
172448	2003 QX_{61}	—	August 23, 2003	Socorro	LINEAR	NYS	1.9 km	MPC · JPL
172449	2003 QN_{65}	—	August 25, 2003	Palomar	NEAT	NYS	1.3 km	MPC · JPL
172450	2003 QR_{78}	—	August 24, 2003	Socorro	LINEAR	ERI	1.7 km	MPC · JPL
172451	2003 QV_{79}	—	August 24, 2003	Reedy Creek	J. Broughton	·	1.3 km	MPC · JPL
172452	2003 QB_{93}	—	August 27, 2003	Palomar	NEAT	·	1.2 km	MPC · JPL
172453	2003 QD_{93}	—	August 27, 2003	Palomar	NEAT	·	1.5 km	MPC · JPL
172454	2003 QR_{101}	—	August 29, 2003	Haleakala	NEAT	·	2.0 km	MPC · JPL
172455	2003 QT_{107}	—	August 30, 2003	Kitt Peak	Spacewatch	·	1.2 km	MPC · JPL
172456	2003 RW	—	September 1, 2003	Socorro	LINEAR	V	1.1 km	MPC · JPL
172457	2003 RU_{1}	—	September 2, 2003	Socorro	LINEAR	·	1.1 km	MPC · JPL
172458	2003 RF_{4}	—	September 1, 2003	Socorro	LINEAR	·	1.7 km	MPC · JPL
172459	2003 RO_{5}	—	September 2, 2003	Socorro	LINEAR	NYS	1.9 km	MPC · JPL
172460	2003 RT_{11}	—	September 15, 2003	Wrightwood	J. W. Young	·	1.1 km	MPC · JPL
172461	2003 SE_{4}	—	September 16, 2003	Kitt Peak	Spacewatch	MAS	1.0 km	MPC · JPL
172462	2003 SF_{4}	—	September 16, 2003	Kitt Peak	Spacewatch	MAS	970 m	MPC · JPL
172463	2003 SO_{6}	—	September 17, 2003	Desert Eagle	W. K. Y. Yeung	NYS	1.9 km	MPC · JPL
172464	2003 SQ_{10}	—	September 17, 2003	Kitt Peak	Spacewatch	·	1.2 km	MPC · JPL
172465	2003 SV_{10}	—	September 17, 2003	Kitt Peak	Spacewatch	NYS	1.5 km	MPC · JPL
172466	2003 SN_{17}	—	September 18, 2003	Kitt Peak	Spacewatch	ERI	3.2 km	MPC · JPL
172467	2003 SZ_{22}	—	September 16, 2003	Palomar	NEAT	·	3.3 km	MPC · JPL
172468	2003 SE_{37}	—	September 16, 2003	Palomar	NEAT	·	1.9 km	MPC · JPL
172469	2003 SF_{45}	—	September 16, 2003	Anderson Mesa	LONEOS	·	1.8 km	MPC · JPL
172470	2003 SY_{45}	—	September 16, 2003	Anderson Mesa	LONEOS	·	2.0 km	MPC · JPL
172471	2003 SW_{46}	—	September 16, 2003	Anderson Mesa	LONEOS	NYS	1.9 km	MPC · JPL
172472	2003 SM_{52}	—	September 18, 2003	Palomar	NEAT	·	2.0 km	MPC · JPL
172473	2003 SB_{55}	—	September 16, 2003	Anderson Mesa	LONEOS	·	1.4 km	MPC · JPL
172474	2003 ST_{70}	—	September 18, 2003	Kitt Peak	Spacewatch	·	1.4 km	MPC · JPL
172475	2003 SA_{76}	—	September 18, 2003	Kitt Peak	Spacewatch	MAS	960 m	MPC · JPL
172476	2003 SR_{79}	—	September 19, 2003	Kitt Peak	Spacewatch	·	2.2 km	MPC · JPL
172477	2003 SM_{86}	—	September 16, 2003	Palomar	NEAT	V	1.3 km	MPC · JPL
172478	2003 SM_{87}	—	September 17, 2003	Socorro	LINEAR	CLA	2.2 km	MPC · JPL
172479	2003 SL_{95}	—	September 19, 2003	Palomar	NEAT	(2076)	1.3 km	MPC · JPL
172480	2003 SE_{97}	—	September 19, 2003	Socorro	LINEAR	NYS	1.8 km	MPC · JPL
172481	2003 SN_{103}	—	September 20, 2003	Socorro	LINEAR	·	1.8 km	MPC · JPL
172482	2003 SS_{104}	—	September 20, 2003	Haleakala	NEAT	·	2.2 km	MPC · JPL
172483	2003 SA_{108}	—	September 20, 2003	Palomar	NEAT	·	2.1 km	MPC · JPL
172484	2003 SC_{108}	—	September 20, 2003	Palomar	NEAT	·	1.2 km	MPC · JPL
172485	2003 ST_{117}	—	September 16, 2003	Palomar	NEAT	V	1.2 km	MPC · JPL
172486	2003 SO_{120}	—	September 17, 2003	Kitt Peak	Spacewatch	·	1.2 km	MPC · JPL
172487	2003 SP_{130}	—	September 20, 2003	Socorro	LINEAR	·	1.5 km	MPC · JPL
172488	2003 ST_{131}	—	September 18, 2003	Kitt Peak	Spacewatch	NYS	1.5 km	MPC · JPL
172489	2003 SV_{138}	—	September 20, 2003	Palomar	NEAT	·	1.7 km	MPC · JPL
172490	2003 SV_{139}	—	September 18, 2003	Kitt Peak	Spacewatch	·	1.1 km	MPC · JPL
172491	2003 SF_{142}	—	September 20, 2003	Kitt Peak	Spacewatch	·	1.4 km	MPC · JPL
172492	2003 SL_{146}	—	September 20, 2003	Palomar	NEAT	·	2.5 km	MPC · JPL
172493	2003 SB_{151}	—	September 17, 2003	Socorro	LINEAR	·	2.0 km	MPC · JPL
172494	2003 SH_{151}	—	September 17, 2003	Socorro	LINEAR	V	1.0 km	MPC · JPL
172495	2003 SR_{155}	—	September 19, 2003	Anderson Mesa	LONEOS	V	1.1 km	MPC · JPL
172496	2003 SC_{165}	—	September 20, 2003	Anderson Mesa	LONEOS	·	1.2 km	MPC · JPL
172497	2003 SB_{168}	—	September 23, 2003	Haleakala	NEAT	·	1.4 km	MPC · JPL
172498	2003 SB_{169}	—	September 23, 2003	Haleakala	NEAT	·	2.0 km	MPC · JPL
172499	2003 SJ_{169}	—	September 23, 2003	Haleakala	NEAT	·	1.8 km	MPC · JPL
172500	2003 SH_{171}	—	September 18, 2003	Campo Imperatore	CINEOS	V	1.1 km	MPC · JPL

== 172501–172600 ==
back to top

Designation			Discovery			Properties		Ref
Permanent	Provisional	Named after	Date	Site	Discoverer(s)	Category	Diam.	Ref
172501	2003 SV_{178}	—	September 19, 2003	Socorro	LINEAR	·	1.9 km	MPC · JPL
172502	2003 SZ_{180}	—	September 20, 2003	Socorro	LINEAR	V	1.0 km	MPC · JPL
172503	2003 SK_{184}	—	September 21, 2003	Kitt Peak	Spacewatch	·	1.4 km	MPC · JPL
172504	2003 SW_{190}	—	September 17, 2003	Kitt Peak	Spacewatch	·	2.3 km	MPC · JPL
172505 Kimberlyespy	2003 SC_{202}	Kimberlyespy	September 22, 2003	Goodricke-Pigott	Reddy, V.	·	1.5 km	MPC · JPL
172506	2003 SB_{204}	—	September 22, 2003	Kitt Peak	Spacewatch	·	1.1 km	MPC · JPL
172507	2003 SH_{208}	—	September 23, 2003	Palomar	NEAT	V	1.1 km	MPC · JPL
172508	2003 SU_{212}	—	September 25, 2003	Haleakala	NEAT	·	2.5 km	MPC · JPL
172509	2003 SS_{218}	—	September 28, 2003	Desert Eagle	W. K. Y. Yeung	·	2.8 km	MPC · JPL
172510	2003 ST_{224}	—	September 28, 2003	Goodricke-Pigott	R. A. Tucker	·	2.9 km	MPC · JPL
172511	2003 SZ_{224}	—	September 25, 2003	Haleakala	NEAT	·	2.1 km	MPC · JPL
172512	2003 SN_{231}	—	September 24, 2003	Palomar	NEAT	·	1.7 km	MPC · JPL
172513	2003 SU_{241}	—	September 27, 2003	Kitt Peak	Spacewatch	·	1.2 km	MPC · JPL
172514	2003 SV_{242}	—	September 27, 2003	Kitt Peak	Spacewatch	NYS	1.4 km	MPC · JPL
172515	2003 SC_{247}	—	September 26, 2003	Socorro	LINEAR	·	1.9 km	MPC · JPL
172516	2003 SN_{247}	—	September 26, 2003	Socorro	LINEAR	MAS	1.1 km	MPC · JPL
172517	2003 SQ_{247}	—	September 26, 2003	Socorro	LINEAR	·	940 m	MPC · JPL
172518	2003 SD_{251}	—	September 26, 2003	Socorro	LINEAR	·	1.8 km	MPC · JPL
172519	2003 SQ_{255}	—	September 27, 2003	Kitt Peak	Spacewatch	NYS	2.3 km	MPC · JPL
172520	2003 SL_{261}	—	September 27, 2003	Socorro	LINEAR	·	1.3 km	MPC · JPL
172521	2003 SG_{266}	—	September 29, 2003	Socorro	LINEAR	·	1.1 km	MPC · JPL
172522	2003 SP_{269}	—	September 28, 2003	Goodricke-Pigott	R. A. Tucker	NYS	1.6 km	MPC · JPL
172523	2003 SO_{291}	—	September 30, 2003	Desert Eagle	W. K. Y. Yeung	·	1.6 km	MPC · JPL
172524	2003 SK_{310}	—	September 28, 2003	Desert Eagle	W. K. Y. Yeung	MAS	950 m	MPC · JPL
172525 Adamblock	2003 TY_{1}	Adamblock	October 4, 2003	Junk Bond	D. Healy	·	2.2 km	MPC · JPL
172526 Carolinegarcia	2003 TN_{3}	Carolinegarcia	October 4, 2003	Goodricke-Pigott	Reddy, V.	·	2.6 km	MPC · JPL
172527	2003 TT_{4}	—	October 1, 2003	Kitt Peak	Spacewatch	·	1.9 km	MPC · JPL
172528	2003 TL_{13}	—	October 14, 2003	Anderson Mesa	LONEOS	PHO	1.8 km	MPC · JPL
172529	2003 TK_{26}	—	October 1, 2003	Anderson Mesa	LONEOS	·	1.9 km	MPC · JPL
172530	2003 TF_{50}	—	October 3, 2003	Haleakala	NEAT	·	1.7 km	MPC · JPL
172531	2003 TW_{57}	—	October 15, 2003	Anderson Mesa	LONEOS	·	3.3 km	MPC · JPL
172532	2003 UN_{8}	—	October 16, 2003	Anderson Mesa	LONEOS	·	3.4 km	MPC · JPL
172533	2003 UO_{9}	—	October 20, 2003	Wrightwood	J. W. Young	MAS	1.1 km	MPC · JPL
172534	2003 UT_{11}	—	October 20, 2003	Socorro	LINEAR	·	1.3 km	MPC · JPL
172535	2003 UV_{21}	—	October 21, 2003	Kingsnake	J. V. McClusky	·	2.1 km	MPC · JPL
172536	2003 UM_{26}	—	October 25, 2003	Goodricke-Pigott	R. A. Tucker	·	1.3 km	MPC · JPL
172537	2003 UH_{27}	—	October 23, 2003	Goodricke-Pigott	R. A. Tucker	slow	1.2 km	MPC · JPL
172538	2003 UZ_{36}	—	October 16, 2003	Palomar	NEAT	V	1.2 km	MPC · JPL
172539	2003 UP_{37}	—	October 17, 2003	Campo Imperatore	CINEOS	V	1.2 km	MPC · JPL
172540	2003 UV_{40}	—	October 16, 2003	Anderson Mesa	LONEOS	·	2.2 km	MPC · JPL
172541	2003 UM_{48}	—	October 16, 2003	Anderson Mesa	LONEOS	·	1.7 km	MPC · JPL
172542	2003 UU_{48}	—	October 16, 2003	Anderson Mesa	LONEOS	·	1.6 km	MPC · JPL
172543	2003 UX_{49}	—	October 16, 2003	Haleakala	NEAT	·	1.7 km	MPC · JPL
172544	2003 UX_{52}	—	October 18, 2003	Palomar	NEAT	·	2.0 km	MPC · JPL
172545	2003 UX_{53}	—	October 18, 2003	Palomar	NEAT	V	1.0 km	MPC · JPL
172546	2003 UH_{56}	—	October 19, 2003	Goodricke-Pigott	R. A. Tucker	·	1.4 km	MPC · JPL
172547	2003 UU_{60}	—	October 16, 2003	Palomar	NEAT	·	1.4 km	MPC · JPL
172548	2003 UA_{80}	—	October 17, 2003	Goodricke-Pigott	R. A. Tucker	·	2.0 km	MPC · JPL
172549	2003 UR_{88}	—	October 19, 2003	Anderson Mesa	LONEOS	·	2.5 km	MPC · JPL
172550	2003 UC_{92}	—	October 20, 2003	Kitt Peak	Spacewatch	·	1.7 km	MPC · JPL
172551	2003 UC_{94}	—	October 18, 2003	Kitt Peak	Spacewatch	·	3.4 km	MPC · JPL
172552	2003 UL_{95}	—	October 18, 2003	Kitt Peak	Spacewatch	·	1.7 km	MPC · JPL
172553	2003 UX_{100}	—	October 20, 2003	Palomar	NEAT	V	1.1 km	MPC · JPL
172554	2003 UR_{104}	—	October 18, 2003	Kitt Peak	Spacewatch	V	930 m	MPC · JPL
172555	2003 US_{109}	—	October 19, 2003	Palomar	NEAT	MAR	1.4 km	MPC · JPL
172556	2003 UZ_{112}	—	October 20, 2003	Socorro	LINEAR	·	1.5 km	MPC · JPL
172557	2003 UC_{116}	—	October 21, 2003	Socorro	LINEAR	V	1.0 km	MPC · JPL
172558	2003 UM_{133}	—	October 20, 2003	Socorro	LINEAR	V	1.0 km	MPC · JPL
172559	2003 UZ_{133}	—	October 20, 2003	Palomar	NEAT	·	2.6 km	MPC · JPL
172560	2003 UU_{134}	—	October 20, 2003	Palomar	NEAT	·	2.1 km	MPC · JPL
172561	2003 UW_{134}	—	October 20, 2003	Palomar	NEAT	V	1.1 km	MPC · JPL
172562	2003 UM_{147}	—	October 18, 2003	Anderson Mesa	LONEOS	·	2.3 km	MPC · JPL
172563	2003 UO_{149}	—	October 20, 2003	Socorro	LINEAR	(5)	1.6 km	MPC · JPL
172564	2003 UU_{161}	—	October 21, 2003	Palomar	NEAT	·	1.7 km	MPC · JPL
172565	2003 UZ_{164}	—	October 21, 2003	Palomar	NEAT	·	1.1 km	MPC · JPL
172566	2003 UH_{165}	—	October 21, 2003	Palomar	NEAT	·	1.0 km	MPC · JPL
172567	2003 UX_{166}	—	October 22, 2003	Socorro	LINEAR	·	1.6 km	MPC · JPL
172568	2003 UB_{171}	—	October 19, 2003	Kitt Peak	Spacewatch	·	1.3 km	MPC · JPL
172569	2003 UB_{175}	—	October 21, 2003	Kitt Peak	Spacewatch	MAS	870 m	MPC · JPL
172570	2003 UX_{178}	—	October 21, 2003	Palomar	NEAT	NYS	1.4 km	MPC · JPL
172571	2003 UD_{179}	—	October 21, 2003	Socorro	LINEAR	·	1.2 km	MPC · JPL
172572	2003 UJ_{190}	—	October 22, 2003	Kitt Peak	Spacewatch	·	2.0 km	MPC · JPL
172573	2003 UL_{201}	—	October 21, 2003	Socorro	LINEAR	MAS	1.0 km	MPC · JPL
172574	2003 UA_{207}	—	October 22, 2003	Socorro	LINEAR	·	2.0 km	MPC · JPL
172575	2003 UO_{222}	—	October 22, 2003	Socorro	LINEAR	·	1.7 km	MPC · JPL
172576	2003 UK_{229}	—	October 23, 2003	Anderson Mesa	LONEOS	·	2.2 km	MPC · JPL
172577	2003 UF_{240}	—	October 24, 2003	Socorro	LINEAR	·	1.7 km	MPC · JPL
172578	2003 UR_{246}	—	October 24, 2003	Socorro	LINEAR	·	2.9 km	MPC · JPL
172579	2003 UC_{249}	—	October 25, 2003	Socorro	LINEAR	·	3.2 km	MPC · JPL
172580	2003 UQ_{249}	—	October 25, 2003	Socorro	LINEAR	·	1.9 km	MPC · JPL
172581	2003 UC_{250}	—	October 25, 2003	Socorro	LINEAR	·	2.2 km	MPC · JPL
172582	2003 UE_{252}	—	October 26, 2003	Catalina	CSS	NYS	1.6 km	MPC · JPL
172583	2003 UZ_{264}	—	October 27, 2003	Socorro	LINEAR	·	1.5 km	MPC · JPL
172584	2003 UO_{267}	—	October 28, 2003	Socorro	LINEAR	·	3.5 km	MPC · JPL
172585	2003 UR_{271}	—	October 28, 2003	Socorro	LINEAR	NYS	1.6 km	MPC · JPL
172586	2003 UR_{274}	—	October 30, 2003	Socorro	LINEAR	·	2.3 km	MPC · JPL
172587	2003 UW_{275}	—	October 29, 2003	Catalina	CSS	(194)	2.3 km	MPC · JPL
172588	2003 UJ_{282}	—	October 29, 2003	Anderson Mesa	LONEOS	(2076)	1.2 km	MPC · JPL
172589	2003 UM_{282}	—	October 29, 2003	Anderson Mesa	LONEOS	·	2.3 km	MPC · JPL
172590	2003 UK_{283}	—	October 30, 2003	Socorro	LINEAR	·	2.0 km	MPC · JPL
172591	2003 UP_{290}	—	October 23, 2003	Kitt Peak	Spacewatch	NYS	1.5 km	MPC · JPL
172592	2003 UD_{298}	—	October 16, 2003	Kitt Peak	Spacewatch	·	1.5 km	MPC · JPL
172593 Vörösmarty	2003 VM	Vörösmarty	November 5, 2003	Piszkéstető	K. Sárneczky, Mészáros, S.	·	2.6 km	MPC · JPL
172594	2003 WL_{8}	—	November 16, 2003	Kitt Peak	Spacewatch	V	1.1 km	MPC · JPL
172595	2003 WS_{16}	—	November 18, 2003	Palomar	NEAT	NYS	1.5 km	MPC · JPL
172596	2003 WA_{21}	—	November 19, 2003	Socorro	LINEAR	·	2.3 km	MPC · JPL
172597	2003 WC_{28}	—	November 16, 2003	Kitt Peak	Spacewatch	·	4.0 km	MPC · JPL
172598	2003 WK_{31}	—	November 18, 2003	Palomar	NEAT	·	2.2 km	MPC · JPL
172599	2003 WO_{31}	—	November 18, 2003	Palomar	NEAT	·	2.4 km	MPC · JPL
172600	2003 WY_{35}	—	November 19, 2003	Catalina	CSS	·	1.9 km	MPC · JPL

== 172601–172700 ==
back to top

Designation			Discovery			Properties		Ref
Permanent	Provisional	Named after	Date	Site	Discoverer(s)	Category	Diam.	Ref
172601	2003 WG_{43}	—	November 18, 2003	Palomar	NEAT	·	1.4 km	MPC · JPL
172602	2003 WA_{49}	—	November 19, 2003	Kitt Peak	Spacewatch	·	2.2 km	MPC · JPL
172603	2003 WX_{54}	—	November 20, 2003	Socorro	LINEAR	·	1.8 km	MPC · JPL
172604	2003 WB_{66}	—	November 19, 2003	Socorro	LINEAR	·	2.1 km	MPC · JPL
172605	2003 WM_{73}	—	November 20, 2003	Socorro	LINEAR	·	1.9 km	MPC · JPL
172606	2003 WB_{81}	—	November 20, 2003	Socorro	LINEAR	NYS	1.8 km	MPC · JPL
172607	2003 WS_{83}	—	November 21, 2003	Socorro	LINEAR	·	3.1 km	MPC · JPL
172608	2003 WA_{86}	—	November 20, 2003	Socorro	LINEAR	EUN · slow	3.7 km	MPC · JPL
172609	2003 WA_{87}	—	November 21, 2003	Socorro	LINEAR	PHO	2.1 km	MPC · JPL
172610	2003 WN_{95}	—	November 19, 2003	Anderson Mesa	LONEOS	·	2.2 km	MPC · JPL
172611	2003 WD_{99}	—	November 20, 2003	Socorro	LINEAR	BAR	2.6 km	MPC · JPL
172612	2003 WN_{99}	—	November 20, 2003	Palomar	NEAT	·	2.2 km	MPC · JPL
172613	2003 WE_{101}	—	November 21, 2003	Socorro	LINEAR	·	1.2 km	MPC · JPL
172614	2003 WY_{119}	—	November 20, 2003	Socorro	LINEAR	·	2.3 km	MPC · JPL
172615	2003 WB_{132}	—	November 19, 2003	Kitt Peak	Spacewatch	·	1.9 km	MPC · JPL
172616	2003 WX_{137}	—	November 21, 2003	Socorro	LINEAR	·	1.9 km	MPC · JPL
172617	2003 WG_{139}	—	November 21, 2003	Socorro	LINEAR	·	1.8 km	MPC · JPL
172618	2003 WH_{139}	—	November 21, 2003	Socorro	LINEAR	·	3.6 km	MPC · JPL
172619	2003 WO_{139}	—	November 21, 2003	Socorro	LINEAR	(5)	2.2 km	MPC · JPL
172620	2003 WD_{140}	—	November 21, 2003	Socorro	LINEAR	·	2.1 km	MPC · JPL
172621	2003 WO_{141}	—	November 21, 2003	Socorro	LINEAR	MAR	2.5 km	MPC · JPL
172622	2003 WY_{144}	—	November 21, 2003	Socorro	LINEAR	·	3.1 km	MPC · JPL
172623	2003 WW_{158}	—	November 29, 2003	Kitt Peak	Spacewatch	·	1.2 km	MPC · JPL
172624	2003 WR_{159}	—	November 29, 2003	Catalina	CSS	JUN	4.7 km	MPC · JPL
172625	2003 WF_{174}	—	November 19, 2003	Kitt Peak	Spacewatch	·	2.6 km	MPC · JPL
172626	2003 XY_{4}	—	December 1, 2003	Catalina	CSS	EUN	2.3 km	MPC · JPL
172627	2003 XP_{10}	—	December 9, 2003	Wrightwood	J. W. Young	·	5.6 km	MPC · JPL
172628	2003 XD_{16}	—	December 14, 2003	Palomar	NEAT	·	2.4 km	MPC · JPL
172629	2003 XD_{17}	—	December 14, 2003	Palomar	NEAT	·	3.9 km	MPC · JPL
172630	2003 XJ_{17}	—	December 15, 2003	Kitt Peak	Spacewatch	·	2.1 km	MPC · JPL
172631	2003 XX_{20}	—	December 14, 2003	Kitt Peak	Spacewatch	·	2.2 km	MPC · JPL
172632	2003 XV_{29}	—	December 1, 2003	Kitt Peak	Spacewatch	·	2.0 km	MPC · JPL
172633	2003 YU_{7}	—	December 20, 2003	Nashville	Clingan, R.	·	1.8 km	MPC · JPL
172634	2003 YY_{13}	—	December 17, 2003	Catalina	CSS	·	3.2 km	MPC · JPL
172635	2003 YV_{14}	—	December 17, 2003	Socorro	LINEAR	·	4.9 km	MPC · JPL
172636	2003 YZ_{14}	—	December 17, 2003	Socorro	LINEAR	ADE	4.2 km	MPC · JPL
172637	2003 YK_{21}	—	December 17, 2003	Kitt Peak	Spacewatch	·	2.6 km	MPC · JPL
172638	2003 YM_{21}	—	December 17, 2003	Kitt Peak	Spacewatch	·	4.8 km	MPC · JPL
172639	2003 YP_{37}	—	December 18, 2003	Kitt Peak	Spacewatch	·	1.0 km	MPC · JPL
172640	2003 YY_{44}	—	December 20, 2003	Socorro	LINEAR	·	1.5 km	MPC · JPL
172641	2003 YJ_{46}	—	December 17, 2003	Socorro	LINEAR	·	3.7 km	MPC · JPL
172642	2003 YA_{47}	—	December 17, 2003	Kitt Peak	Spacewatch	·	2.2 km	MPC · JPL
172643	2003 YY_{47}	—	December 18, 2003	Socorro	LINEAR	·	1.9 km	MPC · JPL
172644	2003 YA_{48}	—	December 18, 2003	Socorro	LINEAR	·	1.9 km	MPC · JPL
172645	2003 YU_{52}	—	December 19, 2003	Socorro	LINEAR	·	2.2 km	MPC · JPL
172646	2003 YK_{54}	—	December 19, 2003	Socorro	LINEAR	(5)	2.2 km	MPC · JPL
172647	2003 YC_{56}	—	December 19, 2003	Socorro	LINEAR	·	2.3 km	MPC · JPL
172648	2003 YM_{56}	—	December 19, 2003	Socorro	LINEAR	NYS	2.1 km	MPC · JPL
172649	2003 YO_{58}	—	December 19, 2003	Socorro	LINEAR	MAR	2.6 km	MPC · JPL
172650	2003 YV_{66}	—	December 20, 2003	Haleakala	NEAT	·	3.0 km	MPC · JPL
172651	2003 YM_{71}	—	December 18, 2003	Socorro	LINEAR	·	2.7 km	MPC · JPL
172652	2003 YE_{77}	—	December 18, 2003	Socorro	LINEAR	·	2.1 km	MPC · JPL
172653	2003 YO_{77}	—	December 18, 2003	Socorro	LINEAR	(5)	1.8 km	MPC · JPL
172654	2003 YL_{80}	—	December 18, 2003	Socorro	LINEAR	·	3.3 km	MPC · JPL
172655	2003 YX_{80}	—	December 18, 2003	Socorro	LINEAR	·	1.8 km	MPC · JPL
172656	2003 YD_{82}	—	December 18, 2003	Socorro	LINEAR	·	5.6 km	MPC · JPL
172657	2003 YH_{82}	—	December 18, 2003	Socorro	LINEAR	(5)	2.0 km	MPC · JPL
172658	2003 YV_{83}	—	December 19, 2003	Socorro	LINEAR	(12739)	2.8 km	MPC · JPL
172659	2003 YW_{92}	—	December 21, 2003	Socorro	LINEAR	·	2.3 km	MPC · JPL
172660	2003 YE_{94}	—	December 21, 2003	Kitt Peak	Spacewatch	·	2.3 km	MPC · JPL
172661	2003 YE_{96}	—	December 19, 2003	Socorro	LINEAR	·	2.1 km	MPC · JPL
172662	2003 YX_{97}	—	December 19, 2003	Socorro	LINEAR	(5)	1.7 km	MPC · JPL
172663	2003 YP_{101}	—	December 19, 2003	Socorro	LINEAR	EUN	2.2 km	MPC · JPL
172664	2003 YA_{103}	—	December 19, 2003	Socorro	LINEAR	·	2.5 km	MPC · JPL
172665	2003 YE_{103}	—	December 19, 2003	Socorro	LINEAR	HNS	1.9 km	MPC · JPL
172666	2003 YB_{113}	—	December 23, 2003	Socorro	LINEAR	·	3.0 km	MPC · JPL
172667	2003 YY_{113}	—	December 24, 2003	Socorro	LINEAR	·	2.7 km	MPC · JPL
172668	2003 YT_{115}	—	December 27, 2003	Socorro	LINEAR	RAF	2.2 km	MPC · JPL
172669	2003 YR_{118}	—	December 27, 2003	Kitt Peak	Spacewatch	·	2.1 km	MPC · JPL
172670	2003 YD_{119}	—	December 27, 2003	Socorro	LINEAR	EUN	2.5 km	MPC · JPL
172671	2003 YS_{119}	—	December 27, 2003	Socorro	LINEAR	·	1.6 km	MPC · JPL
172672	2003 YV_{125}	—	December 27, 2003	Socorro	LINEAR	·	3.6 km	MPC · JPL
172673	2003 YH_{126}	—	December 27, 2003	Socorro	LINEAR	EUN	3.4 km	MPC · JPL
172674	2003 YW_{130}	—	December 28, 2003	Socorro	LINEAR	·	3.1 km	MPC · JPL
172675	2003 YM_{134}	—	December 28, 2003	Socorro	LINEAR	·	2.9 km	MPC · JPL
172676	2003 YD_{136}	—	December 30, 2003	Sandlot	G. Hug	PHO	3.0 km	MPC · JPL
172677	2003 YA_{137}	—	December 27, 2003	Socorro	LINEAR	EOS	4.0 km	MPC · JPL
172678	2003 YM_{137}	—	December 27, 2003	Socorro	LINEAR	APO · PHA	590 m	MPC · JPL
172679	2003 YW_{137}	—	December 27, 2003	Kitt Peak	Spacewatch	·	2.2 km	MPC · JPL
172680	2003 YK_{138}	—	December 27, 2003	Socorro	LINEAR	NEM	3.9 km	MPC · JPL
172681	2003 YR_{146}	—	December 28, 2003	Socorro	LINEAR	·	2.0 km	MPC · JPL
172682	2003 YD_{147}	—	December 29, 2003	Socorro	LINEAR	·	3.1 km	MPC · JPL
172683	2003 YX_{148}	—	December 29, 2003	Socorro	LINEAR	·	2.7 km	MPC · JPL
172684	2003 YQ_{149}	—	December 29, 2003	Socorro	LINEAR	·	3.1 km	MPC · JPL
172685	2003 YG_{155}	—	December 30, 2003	Socorro	LINEAR	·	3.6 km	MPC · JPL
172686	2003 YR_{155}	—	December 26, 2003	Haleakala	NEAT	·	2.7 km	MPC · JPL
172687	2003 YQ_{162}	—	December 17, 2003	Socorro	LINEAR	ADE	3.9 km	MPC · JPL
172688	2003 YY_{163}	—	December 17, 2003	Kitt Peak	Spacewatch	·	1.4 km	MPC · JPL
172689	2003 YQ_{169}	—	December 18, 2003	Socorro	LINEAR	·	2.5 km	MPC · JPL
172690	2003 YC_{175}	—	December 19, 2003	Kitt Peak	Spacewatch	·	2.6 km	MPC · JPL
172691	2003 YG_{175}	—	December 19, 2003	Kitt Peak	Spacewatch	·	1.9 km	MPC · JPL
172692	2004 AR_{5}	—	January 13, 2004	Anderson Mesa	LONEOS	·	2.8 km	MPC · JPL
172693	2004 AV_{5}	—	January 13, 2004	Palomar	NEAT	·	3.6 km	MPC · JPL
172694	2004 AZ_{7}	—	January 13, 2004	Anderson Mesa	LONEOS	·	2.2 km	MPC · JPL
172695	2004 BO_{5}	—	January 16, 2004	Kitt Peak	Spacewatch	·	2.8 km	MPC · JPL
172696	2004 BE_{7}	—	January 16, 2004	Kitt Peak	Spacewatch	·	2.7 km	MPC · JPL
172697	2004 BT_{11}	—	January 16, 2004	Palomar	NEAT	·	1.6 km	MPC · JPL
172698	2004 BO_{15}	—	January 16, 2004	Kitt Peak	Spacewatch	·	1.6 km	MPC · JPL
172699	2004 BR_{23}	—	January 18, 2004	Palomar	NEAT	·	4.2 km	MPC · JPL
172700	2004 BJ_{24}	—	January 19, 2004	Anderson Mesa	LONEOS	·	2.1 km	MPC · JPL

== 172701–172800 ==
back to top

Designation			Discovery			Properties		Ref
Permanent	Provisional	Named after	Date	Site	Discoverer(s)	Category	Diam.	Ref
172701	2004 BM_{25}	—	January 19, 2004	Catalina	CSS	·	2.7 km	MPC · JPL
172702	2004 BF_{28}	—	January 18, 2004	Palomar	NEAT	·	2.0 km	MPC · JPL
172703	2004 BE_{29}	—	January 18, 2004	Palomar	NEAT	·	2.7 km	MPC · JPL
172704	2004 BS_{31}	—	January 19, 2004	Anderson Mesa	LONEOS	·	2.4 km	MPC · JPL
172705	2004 BK_{32}	—	January 19, 2004	Kitt Peak	Spacewatch	KOR	1.8 km	MPC · JPL
172706	2004 BQ_{35}	—	January 19, 2004	Kitt Peak	Spacewatch	KOR	2.3 km	MPC · JPL
172707	2004 BW_{43}	—	January 22, 2004	Socorro	LINEAR	AGN	2.3 km	MPC · JPL
172708	2004 BT_{46}	—	January 21, 2004	Socorro	LINEAR	ADE	5.1 km	MPC · JPL
172709	2004 BZ_{48}	—	January 21, 2004	Socorro	LINEAR	·	3.3 km	MPC · JPL
172710	2004 BD_{49}	—	January 21, 2004	Socorro	LINEAR	MRX	1.2 km	MPC · JPL
172711	2004 BG_{55}	—	January 22, 2004	Socorro	LINEAR	·	3.2 km	MPC · JPL
172712	2004 BT_{56}	—	January 23, 2004	Anderson Mesa	LONEOS	·	3.0 km	MPC · JPL
172713	2004 BA_{60}	—	January 21, 2004	Socorro	LINEAR	·	2.0 km	MPC · JPL
172714	2004 BS_{62}	—	January 22, 2004	Socorro	LINEAR	·	3.3 km	MPC · JPL
172715	2004 BP_{67}	—	January 24, 2004	Socorro	LINEAR	·	2.9 km	MPC · JPL
172716	2004 BS_{77}	—	January 22, 2004	Socorro	LINEAR	(12739)	2.4 km	MPC · JPL
172717	2004 BS_{81}	—	January 26, 2004	Anderson Mesa	LONEOS	WIT	1.8 km	MPC · JPL
172718	2004 BD_{85}	—	January 28, 2004	Socorro	LINEAR	AMO	600 m	MPC · JPL
172719	2004 BQ_{89}	—	January 23, 2004	Socorro	LINEAR	·	5.0 km	MPC · JPL
172720	2004 BO_{93}	—	January 28, 2004	Socorro	LINEAR	HNS	2.4 km	MPC · JPL
172721	2004 BH_{101}	—	January 28, 2004	Kitt Peak	Spacewatch	·	2.5 km	MPC · JPL
172722	2004 BV_{102}	—	January 31, 2004	Socorro	LINEAR	APO +1km	1.0 km	MPC · JPL
172723	2004 BL_{108}	—	January 28, 2004	Catalina	CSS	(5)	2.3 km	MPC · JPL
172724	2004 BR_{111}	—	January 29, 2004	Catalina	CSS	JUN	1.9 km	MPC · JPL
172725	2004 BG_{112}	—	January 24, 2004	Socorro	LINEAR	·	1.5 km	MPC · JPL
172726	2004 BK_{114}	—	January 29, 2004	Anderson Mesa	LONEOS	·	1.7 km	MPC · JPL
172727	2004 BF_{118}	—	January 29, 2004	Socorro	LINEAR	·	2.2 km	MPC · JPL
172728	2004 BN_{119}	—	January 30, 2004	Catalina	CSS	·	2.7 km	MPC · JPL
172729	2004 BF_{120}	—	January 30, 2004	Kitt Peak	Spacewatch	·	3.2 km	MPC · JPL
172730	2004 BL_{120}	—	January 31, 2004	Anderson Mesa	LONEOS	·	2.6 km	MPC · JPL
172731	2004 BY_{120}	—	January 31, 2004	Socorro	LINEAR	·	3.2 km	MPC · JPL
172732	2004 BZ_{120}	—	January 31, 2004	Socorro	LINEAR	MAR	2.2 km	MPC · JPL
172733	2004 BR_{122}	—	January 18, 2004	Kitt Peak	Spacewatch	ANF	1.9 km	MPC · JPL
172734 Giansimon	2004 CN_{1}	Giansimon	February 10, 2004	San Marcello	L. Tesi, Fagioli, G.	·	2.2 km	MPC · JPL
172735	2004 CF_{3}	—	February 9, 2004	Palomar	NEAT	·	4.8 km	MPC · JPL
172736	2004 CA_{8}	—	February 10, 2004	Palomar	NEAT	·	2.1 km	MPC · JPL
172737	2004 CD_{9}	—	February 11, 2004	Kitt Peak	Spacewatch	·	2.4 km	MPC · JPL
172738	2004 CF_{12}	—	February 11, 2004	Catalina	CSS	·	3.4 km	MPC · JPL
172739	2004 CT_{23}	—	February 12, 2004	Kitt Peak	Spacewatch	·	3.2 km	MPC · JPL
172740	2004 CZ_{27}	—	February 12, 2004	Kitt Peak	Spacewatch	HOF	3.9 km	MPC · JPL
172741	2004 CG_{61}	—	February 11, 2004	Kitt Peak	Spacewatch	·	2.7 km	MPC · JPL
172742	2004 CC_{67}	—	February 15, 2004	Socorro	LINEAR	·	3.0 km	MPC · JPL
172743	2004 CO_{74}	—	February 11, 2004	Kitt Peak	Spacewatch	MRX	1.6 km	MPC · JPL
172744	2004 CX_{78}	—	February 11, 2004	Palomar	NEAT	·	2.7 km	MPC · JPL
172745	2004 CQ_{81}	—	February 12, 2004	Kitt Peak	Spacewatch	·	2.2 km	MPC · JPL
172746	2004 CB_{86}	—	February 14, 2004	Kitt Peak	Spacewatch	KOR	2.2 km	MPC · JPL
172747	2004 CZ_{88}	—	February 11, 2004	Kitt Peak	Spacewatch	AGN	1.6 km	MPC · JPL
172748	2004 CX_{96}	—	February 12, 2004	Palomar	NEAT	·	3.8 km	MPC · JPL
172749	2004 CB_{98}	—	February 14, 2004	Socorro	LINEAR	·	3.1 km	MPC · JPL
172750	2004 CE_{98}	—	February 14, 2004	Socorro	LINEAR	·	3.0 km	MPC · JPL
172751	2004 CJ_{100}	—	February 15, 2004	Catalina	CSS	·	4.6 km	MPC · JPL
172752	2004 CF_{108}	—	February 15, 2004	Socorro	LINEAR	·	2.5 km	MPC · JPL
172753	2004 CO_{117}	—	February 11, 2004	Palomar	NEAT	AGN	1.8 km	MPC · JPL
172754	2004 DM	—	February 16, 2004	Desert Eagle	W. K. Y. Yeung	TRE	4.1 km	MPC · JPL
172755	2004 DV_{6}	—	February 16, 2004	Kitt Peak	Spacewatch	·	4.8 km	MPC · JPL
172756	2004 DJ_{12}	—	February 17, 2004	Haleakala	NEAT	·	3.0 km	MPC · JPL
172757	2004 DT_{12}	—	February 16, 2004	Catalina	CSS	·	3.9 km	MPC · JPL
172758	2004 DC_{18}	—	February 18, 2004	Socorro	LINEAR	·	2.3 km	MPC · JPL
172759	2004 DK_{23}	—	February 18, 2004	Catalina	CSS	EUN	2.1 km	MPC · JPL
172760	2004 DQ_{23}	—	February 18, 2004	Catalina	CSS	EOS	3.3 km	MPC · JPL
172761	2004 DP_{24}	—	February 19, 2004	Socorro	LINEAR	·	7.3 km	MPC · JPL
172762	2004 DN_{25}	—	February 22, 2004	Great Shefford	Birtwhistle, P.	·	3.2 km	MPC · JPL
172763	2004 DJ_{32}	—	February 18, 2004	Socorro	LINEAR	·	2.4 km	MPC · JPL
172764	2004 DY_{42}	—	February 23, 2004	Socorro	LINEAR	·	3.1 km	MPC · JPL
172765	2004 DW_{51}	—	February 23, 2004	Socorro	LINEAR	·	2.6 km	MPC · JPL
172766	2004 DR_{56}	—	February 22, 2004	Kitt Peak	Spacewatch	·	2.5 km	MPC · JPL
172767	2004 DH_{60}	—	February 26, 2004	Socorro	LINEAR	·	3.7 km	MPC · JPL
172768	2004 DJ_{60}	—	February 26, 2004	Socorro	LINEAR	·	2.2 km	MPC · JPL
172769	2004 DV_{75}	—	February 17, 2004	Socorro	LINEAR	·	2.6 km	MPC · JPL
172770	2004 EV_{2}	—	March 9, 2004	Palomar	NEAT	·	4.2 km	MPC · JPL
172771	2004 ER_{3}	—	March 10, 2004	Palomar	NEAT	·	2.2 km	MPC · JPL
172772	2004 EZ_{12}	—	March 11, 2004	Palomar	NEAT	·	5.6 km	MPC · JPL
172773	2004 EQ_{15}	—	March 12, 2004	Palomar	NEAT	·	3.4 km	MPC · JPL
172774	2004 EO_{23}	—	March 15, 2004	Palomar	NEAT	BAR	2.7 km	MPC · JPL
172775	2004 EW_{30}	—	March 15, 2004	Catalina	CSS	·	2.6 km	MPC · JPL
172776	2004 ER_{31}	—	March 14, 2004	Palomar	NEAT	DOR	4.0 km	MPC · JPL
172777	2004 EL_{57}	—	March 15, 2004	Palomar	NEAT	·	6.9 km	MPC · JPL
172778	2004 EE_{64}	—	March 14, 2004	Socorro	LINEAR	·	3.8 km	MPC · JPL
172779	2004 ET_{65}	—	March 14, 2004	Socorro	LINEAR	NAE	5.3 km	MPC · JPL
172780	2004 ED_{66}	—	March 14, 2004	Kitt Peak	Spacewatch	·	2.3 km	MPC · JPL
172781	2004 EV_{75}	—	March 14, 2004	Palomar	NEAT	MRX	1.9 km	MPC · JPL
172782	2004 EZ_{75}	—	March 15, 2004	Kitt Peak	Spacewatch	THM	4.5 km	MPC · JPL
172783	2004 EL_{80}	—	March 14, 2004	Socorro	LINEAR	EOS	3.4 km	MPC · JPL
172784	2004 EH_{83}	—	March 14, 2004	Palomar	NEAT	·	6.7 km	MPC · JPL
172785	2004 ES_{114}	—	March 11, 2004	Palomar	NEAT	·	2.5 km	MPC · JPL
172786	2004 FX_{14}	—	March 16, 2004	Catalina	CSS	·	2.6 km	MPC · JPL
172787	2004 FK_{15}	—	March 16, 2004	Siding Spring	SSS	EUN	2.4 km	MPC · JPL
172788	2004 FH_{17}	—	March 23, 2004	Goodricke-Pigott	Goodricke-Pigott	EOS	3.3 km	MPC · JPL
172789	2004 FQ_{31}	—	March 30, 2004	Socorro	LINEAR	·	7.8 km	MPC · JPL
172790	2004 FQ_{32}	—	March 16, 2004	Socorro	LINEAR	·	2.7 km	MPC · JPL
172791	2004 FY_{35}	—	March 16, 2004	Socorro	LINEAR	·	3.6 km	MPC · JPL
172792	2004 FW_{40}	—	March 18, 2004	Socorro	LINEAR	·	3.3 km	MPC · JPL
172793	2004 FP_{42}	—	March 18, 2004	Kitt Peak	Spacewatch	·	3.8 km	MPC · JPL
172794	2004 FU_{60}	—	March 18, 2004	Kitt Peak	Spacewatch	·	4.6 km	MPC · JPL
172795	2004 FT_{62}	—	March 19, 2004	Socorro	LINEAR	·	4.0 km	MPC · JPL
172796	2004 FP_{91}	—	March 22, 2004	Socorro	LINEAR	·	2.8 km	MPC · JPL
172797	2004 FN_{103}	—	March 23, 2004	Socorro	LINEAR	·	2.6 km	MPC · JPL
172798	2004 FU_{108}	—	March 23, 2004	Kitt Peak	Spacewatch	·	3.0 km	MPC · JPL
172799	2004 FE_{112}	—	March 26, 2004	Kitt Peak	Spacewatch	KOR	1.9 km	MPC · JPL
172800	2004 FW_{122}	—	March 26, 2004	Socorro	LINEAR	·	3.8 km	MPC · JPL

== 172801–172900 ==
back to top

Designation			Discovery			Properties		Ref
Permanent	Provisional	Named after	Date	Site	Discoverer(s)	Category	Diam.	Ref
172801	2004 FS_{129}	—	March 19, 2004	Socorro	LINEAR	·	5.0 km	MPC · JPL
172802	2004 FJ_{132}	—	March 23, 2004	Kitt Peak	Spacewatch	·	3.8 km	MPC · JPL
172803	2004 FH_{139}	—	March 20, 2004	Anderson Mesa	LONEOS	DOR	5.4 km	MPC · JPL
172804	2004 FL_{143}	—	March 28, 2004	Socorro	LINEAR	·	3.7 km	MPC · JPL
172805	2004 FQ_{156}	—	March 17, 2004	Kitt Peak	Spacewatch	·	2.9 km	MPC · JPL
172806	2004 GT_{10}	—	April 13, 2004	Kitt Peak	Spacewatch	BRA	2.7 km	MPC · JPL
172807	2004 GC_{16}	—	April 10, 2004	Palomar	NEAT	·	3.4 km	MPC · JPL
172808	2004 GS_{26}	—	April 14, 2004	Anderson Mesa	LONEOS	·	5.0 km	MPC · JPL
172809	2004 GV_{27}	—	April 15, 2004	Palomar	NEAT	·	5.8 km	MPC · JPL
172810	2004 GR_{32}	—	April 12, 2004	Palomar	NEAT	·	4.2 km	MPC · JPL
172811	2004 GO_{35}	—	April 13, 2004	Palomar	NEAT	·	3.3 km	MPC · JPL
172812	2004 GG_{38}	—	April 15, 2004	Catalina	CSS	EOS	3.3 km	MPC · JPL
172813	2004 GD_{55}	—	April 13, 2004	Kitt Peak	Spacewatch	·	5.5 km	MPC · JPL
172814	2004 GV_{55}	—	April 13, 2004	Kitt Peak	Spacewatch	·	3.3 km	MPC · JPL
172815	2004 GD_{88}	—	April 13, 2004	Siding Spring	SSS	·	4.4 km	MPC · JPL
172816	2004 HX_{1}	—	April 20, 2004	Desert Eagle	W. K. Y. Yeung	·	3.4 km	MPC · JPL
172817	2004 HS_{54}	—	April 21, 2004	Socorro	LINEAR	AEO	1.7 km	MPC · JPL
172818	2004 HS_{58}	—	April 24, 2004	Kitt Peak	Spacewatch	3:2	8.6 km	MPC · JPL
172819	2004 JN_{42}	—	May 15, 2004	Socorro	LINEAR	L4	19 km	MPC · JPL
172820	2004 RN_{2}	—	September 6, 2004	Socorro	LINEAR	H	920 m	MPC · JPL
172821	2004 RB_{138}	—	September 8, 2004	Socorro	LINEAR	H	830 m	MPC · JPL
172822	2004 TD_{13}	—	October 6, 2004	Palomar	NEAT	H · slow	730 m	MPC · JPL
172823	2004 TL_{183}	—	October 7, 2004	Kitt Peak	Spacewatch	·	1.1 km	MPC · JPL
172824	2004 XA	—	December 1, 2004	Socorro	LINEAR	H	1.3 km	MPC · JPL
172825	2004 YH_{14}	—	December 18, 2004	Mount Lemmon	Mount Lemmon Survey	·	910 m	MPC · JPL
172826	2004 YL_{31}	—	December 19, 2004	Kitt Peak	Spacewatch	·	1.4 km	MPC · JPL
172827	2005 AA_{2}	—	January 1, 2005	Catalina	CSS	·	1.1 km	MPC · JPL
172828	2005 AQ_{9}	—	January 7, 2005	Catalina	CSS	·	1.8 km	MPC · JPL
172829	2005 AV_{13}	—	January 7, 2005	Socorro	LINEAR	·	1.3 km	MPC · JPL
172830	2005 AB_{82}	—	January 7, 2005	Catalina	CSS	ERI	3.1 km	MPC · JPL
172831	2005 CC_{4}	—	February 1, 2005	Kitt Peak	Spacewatch	·	1.9 km	MPC · JPL
172832	2005 CN_{4}	—	February 1, 2005	Kitt Peak	Spacewatch	·	2.3 km	MPC · JPL
172833	2005 CZ_{11}	—	February 1, 2005	Catalina	CSS	·	1.0 km	MPC · JPL
172834	2005 CO_{18}	—	February 2, 2005	Catalina	CSS	SUL	3.0 km	MPC · JPL
172835	2005 CW_{36}	—	February 3, 2005	Socorro	LINEAR	MAS	1.0 km	MPC · JPL
172836	2005 CX_{37}	—	February 7, 2005	Gnosca	S. Sposetti	·	1.2 km	MPC · JPL
172837	2005 CR_{43}	—	February 2, 2005	Catalina	CSS	·	2.1 km	MPC · JPL
172838	2005 CP_{48}	—	February 2, 2005	Socorro	LINEAR	·	950 m	MPC · JPL
172839	2005 CE_{73}	—	February 1, 2005	Kitt Peak	Spacewatch	NYS	2.5 km	MPC · JPL
172840	2005 EK_{3}	—	March 1, 2005	Kitt Peak	Spacewatch	·	2.2 km	MPC · JPL
172841	2005 EA_{5}	—	March 1, 2005	Kitt Peak	Spacewatch	·	1.7 km	MPC · JPL
172842	2005 EN_{9}	—	March 2, 2005	Kitt Peak	Spacewatch	·	2.0 km	MPC · JPL
172843	2005 ER_{9}	—	March 2, 2005	Kitt Peak	Spacewatch	·	1.3 km	MPC · JPL
172844	2005 EP_{10}	—	March 2, 2005	Kitt Peak	Spacewatch	·	1.6 km	MPC · JPL
172845	2005 EK_{11}	—	March 2, 2005	Catalina	CSS	·	1.3 km	MPC · JPL
172846	2005 EH_{14}	—	March 3, 2005	Kitt Peak	Spacewatch	·	2.4 km	MPC · JPL
172847	2005 EC_{15}	—	March 3, 2005	Kitt Peak	Spacewatch	·	1.2 km	MPC · JPL
172848	2005 EA_{17}	—	March 3, 2005	Kitt Peak	Spacewatch	NYS	1.4 km	MPC · JPL
172849	2005 EN_{21}	—	March 3, 2005	Catalina	CSS	·	1.3 km	MPC · JPL
172850 Coppens	2005 EU_{27}	Coppens	March 3, 2005	Tenagra II	J.-C. Merlin	·	2.2 km	MPC · JPL
172851	2005 EF_{28}	—	March 3, 2005	Catalina	CSS	·	1.2 km	MPC · JPL
172852	2005 EW_{33}	—	March 7, 2005	RAS	Lowe, A.	·	940 m	MPC · JPL
172853	2005 EC_{39}	—	March 4, 2005	Mount Lemmon	Mount Lemmon Survey	·	1.3 km	MPC · JPL
172854	2005 ED_{44}	—	March 3, 2005	Kitt Peak	Spacewatch	·	1.7 km	MPC · JPL
172855	2005 EL_{46}	—	March 3, 2005	Catalina	CSS	·	1.2 km	MPC · JPL
172856	2005 ES_{46}	—	March 3, 2005	Catalina	CSS	·	1.4 km	MPC · JPL
172857	2005 EL_{49}	—	March 3, 2005	Catalina	CSS	NYS	1.6 km	MPC · JPL
172858	2005 EC_{69}	—	March 7, 2005	Socorro	LINEAR	·	1.7 km	MPC · JPL
172859	2005 ET_{73}	—	March 3, 2005	Kitt Peak	Spacewatch	·	2.0 km	MPC · JPL
172860	2005 EC_{79}	—	March 3, 2005	Catalina	CSS	·	2.0 km	MPC · JPL
172861	2005 EY_{82}	—	March 4, 2005	Kitt Peak	Spacewatch	·	980 m	MPC · JPL
172862	2005 EO_{83}	—	March 4, 2005	Kitt Peak	Spacewatch	·	1.8 km	MPC · JPL
172863	2005 EW_{83}	—	March 4, 2005	Catalina	CSS	·	1.2 km	MPC · JPL
172864	2005 EQ_{84}	—	March 4, 2005	Socorro	LINEAR	·	1.6 km	MPC · JPL
172865	2005 EC_{97}	—	March 3, 2005	Catalina	CSS	·	3.5 km	MPC · JPL
172866	2005 EC_{102}	—	March 3, 2005	Catalina	CSS	V	1.3 km	MPC · JPL
172867	2005 EX_{118}	—	March 7, 2005	Socorro	LINEAR	·	1.1 km	MPC · JPL
172868	2005 ET_{124}	—	March 8, 2005	Socorro	LINEAR	·	1.4 km	MPC · JPL
172869	2005 EH_{126}	—	March 8, 2005	Socorro	LINEAR	MAR	1.8 km	MPC · JPL
172870	2005 EH_{132}	—	March 9, 2005	Anderson Mesa	LONEOS	(5)	2.5 km	MPC · JPL
172871	2005 EH_{137}	—	March 9, 2005	Mount Lemmon	Mount Lemmon Survey	·	2.5 km	MPC · JPL
172872	2005 EH_{139}	—	March 9, 2005	Mount Lemmon	Mount Lemmon Survey	·	2.1 km	MPC · JPL
172873	2005 EC_{143}	—	March 10, 2005	Catalina	CSS	·	1.2 km	MPC · JPL
172874	2005 EO_{161}	—	March 9, 2005	Mount Lemmon	Mount Lemmon Survey	·	2.9 km	MPC · JPL
172875	2005 EW_{165}	—	March 11, 2005	Kitt Peak	Spacewatch	AST	3.1 km	MPC · JPL
172876	2005 EY_{168}	—	March 11, 2005	Mount Lemmon	Mount Lemmon Survey	·	1.9 km	MPC · JPL
172877	2005 EL_{175}	—	March 8, 2005	Kitt Peak	Spacewatch	·	1.5 km	MPC · JPL
172878	2005 EP_{175}	—	March 8, 2005	Kitt Peak	Spacewatch	·	2.4 km	MPC · JPL
172879	2005 EX_{193}	—	March 11, 2005	Socorro	LINEAR	·	1.5 km	MPC · JPL
172880	2005 EJ_{198}	—	March 11, 2005	Mount Lemmon	Mount Lemmon Survey	NYS	1.2 km	MPC · JPL
172881	2005 EQ_{199}	—	March 12, 2005	Kitt Peak	Spacewatch	·	1.9 km	MPC · JPL
172882	2005 EQ_{220}	—	March 11, 2005	Mount Lemmon	Mount Lemmon Survey	·	940 m	MPC · JPL
172883	2005 EP_{256}	—	March 11, 2005	Anderson Mesa	LONEOS	·	3.6 km	MPC · JPL
172884	2005 ES_{256}	—	March 11, 2005	Anderson Mesa	LONEOS	·	1.2 km	MPC · JPL
172885	2005 EL_{269}	—	March 15, 2005	Mount Lemmon	Mount Lemmon Survey	·	1.1 km	MPC · JPL
172886	2005 EU_{281}	—	March 10, 2005	Catalina	CSS	·	2.2 km	MPC · JPL
172887	2005 ET_{287}	—	March 8, 2005	Anderson Mesa	LONEOS	·	1.0 km	MPC · JPL
172888	2005 EE_{290}	—	March 9, 2005	Kitt Peak	Spacewatch	·	6.6 km	MPC · JPL
172889	2005 EG_{291}	—	March 10, 2005	Catalina	CSS	·	2.9 km	MPC · JPL
172890	2005 FN_{6}	—	March 30, 2005	Catalina	CSS	·	2.1 km	MPC · JPL
172891	2005 GX_{2}	—	April 1, 2005	Anderson Mesa	LONEOS	·	1.6 km	MPC · JPL
172892	2005 GL_{6}	—	April 1, 2005	Kitt Peak	Spacewatch	NEM	3.8 km	MPC · JPL
172893	2005 GE_{9}	—	April 2, 2005	Bergisch Gladbach	W. Bickel	·	2.7 km	MPC · JPL
172894	2005 GX_{17}	—	April 2, 2005	Goodricke-Pigott	R. A. Tucker	·	2.4 km	MPC · JPL
172895	2005 GQ_{27}	—	April 3, 2005	Palomar	NEAT	·	2.0 km	MPC · JPL
172896	2005 GN_{30}	—	April 4, 2005	Catalina	CSS	·	1.7 km	MPC · JPL
172897	2005 GO_{30}	—	April 4, 2005	Catalina	CSS	·	3.3 km	MPC · JPL
172898	2005 GV_{35}	—	April 2, 2005	Catalina	CSS	·	3.3 km	MPC · JPL
172899	2005 GU_{47}	—	April 5, 2005	Palomar	NEAT	·	3.9 km	MPC · JPL
172900	2005 GQ_{51}	—	April 2, 2005	Palomar	NEAT	·	2.7 km	MPC · JPL

== 172901–173000 ==
back to top

Designation			Discovery			Properties		Ref
Permanent	Provisional	Named after	Date	Site	Discoverer(s)	Category	Diam.	Ref
172901	2005 GY_{68}	—	April 2, 2005	Mount Lemmon	Mount Lemmon Survey	·	2.8 km	MPC · JPL
172902	2005 GO_{75}	—	April 5, 2005	Mount Lemmon	Mount Lemmon Survey	MAS	950 m	MPC · JPL
172903	2005 GC_{78}	—	April 6, 2005	Catalina	CSS	·	3.3 km	MPC · JPL
172904	2005 GR_{79}	—	April 6, 2005	Mount Lemmon	Mount Lemmon Survey	·	1.5 km	MPC · JPL
172905	2005 GX_{79}	—	April 7, 2005	Anderson Mesa	LONEOS	·	1.4 km	MPC · JPL
172906	2005 GY_{79}	—	April 7, 2005	Anderson Mesa	LONEOS	·	2.2 km	MPC · JPL
172907	2005 GC_{90}	—	April 6, 2005	Catalina	CSS	V	1.2 km	MPC · JPL
172908	2005 GV_{92}	—	April 6, 2005	Mount Lemmon	Mount Lemmon Survey	·	2.5 km	MPC · JPL
172909	2005 GH_{95}	—	April 6, 2005	Kitt Peak	Spacewatch	·	2.2 km	MPC · JPL
172910	2005 GF_{96}	—	April 6, 2005	Kitt Peak	Spacewatch	MAS	1.1 km	MPC · JPL
172911	2005 GA_{99}	—	April 7, 2005	Kitt Peak	Spacewatch	·	1.7 km	MPC · JPL
172912	2005 GB_{99}	—	April 7, 2005	Kitt Peak	Spacewatch	·	2.3 km	MPC · JPL
172913	2005 GM_{99}	—	April 7, 2005	Kitt Peak	Spacewatch	·	2.1 km	MPC · JPL
172914	2005 GJ_{103}	—	April 9, 2005	Mount Lemmon	Mount Lemmon Survey	·	1.8 km	MPC · JPL
172915	2005 GE_{106}	—	April 10, 2005	Kitt Peak	Spacewatch	·	2.6 km	MPC · JPL
172916	2005 GU_{112}	—	April 6, 2005	Kitt Peak	Spacewatch	·	2.5 km	MPC · JPL
172917	2005 GX_{130}	—	April 9, 2005	Kitt Peak	Spacewatch	AGN	1.5 km	MPC · JPL
172918	2005 GL_{135}	—	April 10, 2005	Kitt Peak	Spacewatch	(5)	1.9 km	MPC · JPL
172919	2005 GP_{135}	—	April 10, 2005	Kitt Peak	Spacewatch	·	4.0 km	MPC · JPL
172920	2005 GL_{138}	—	April 12, 2005	Kitt Peak	Spacewatch	·	2.5 km	MPC · JPL
172921	2005 GX_{138}	—	April 12, 2005	Kitt Peak	Spacewatch	·	4.0 km	MPC · JPL
172922	2005 GL_{139}	—	April 12, 2005	Kitt Peak	Spacewatch	·	3.1 km	MPC · JPL
172923	2005 GK_{140}	—	April 13, 2005	Socorro	LINEAR	·	3.0 km	MPC · JPL
172924	2005 GE_{144}	—	April 10, 2005	Kitt Peak	Spacewatch	HYG	5.6 km	MPC · JPL
172925	2005 GY_{155}	—	April 10, 2005	Mount Lemmon	Mount Lemmon Survey	KOR	1.9 km	MPC · JPL
172926	2005 GE_{156}	—	April 10, 2005	Mount Lemmon	Mount Lemmon Survey	(5)	1.7 km	MPC · JPL
172927	2005 GK_{157}	—	April 11, 2005	Kitt Peak	Spacewatch	HOF	4.0 km	MPC · JPL
172928	2005 GQ_{168}	—	April 12, 2005	Kitt Peak	Spacewatch	·	3.8 km	MPC · JPL
172929	2005 GM_{170}	—	April 12, 2005	Socorro	LINEAR	·	1.8 km	MPC · JPL
172930	2005 HZ_{3}	—	April 18, 2005	Socorro	LINEAR	·	2.6 km	MPC · JPL
172931	2005 HA_{4}	—	April 28, 2005	Reedy Creek	J. Broughton	·	2.7 km	MPC · JPL
172932 Bachleitner	2005 JC	Bachleitner	May 1, 2005	Altschwendt	W. Ries	·	1.8 km	MPC · JPL
172933	2005 JH	—	May 2, 2005	Reedy Creek	J. Broughton	·	2.5 km	MPC · JPL
172934	2005 JX	—	May 3, 2005	Socorro	LINEAR	·	3.6 km	MPC · JPL
172935	2005 JF_{4}	—	May 3, 2005	Catalina	CSS	ADE	3.7 km	MPC · JPL
172936	2005 JW_{29}	—	May 3, 2005	Socorro	LINEAR	·	2.3 km	MPC · JPL
172937 Pattysieck	2005 JS_{32}	Pattysieck	May 4, 2005	Mount Lemmon	Mount Lemmon Survey	·	5.0 km	MPC · JPL
172938	2005 JV_{48}	—	May 3, 2005	Kitt Peak	Spacewatch	(43176)	4.1 km	MPC · JPL
172939	2005 JY_{49}	—	May 4, 2005	Kitt Peak	Spacewatch	slow	5.5 km	MPC · JPL
172940	2005 JA_{51}	—	May 4, 2005	Kitt Peak	Spacewatch	KOR	2.0 km	MPC · JPL
172941	2005 JU_{66}	—	May 4, 2005	Palomar	NEAT	NYS	1.1 km	MPC · JPL
172942	2005 JX_{71}	—	May 8, 2005	Anderson Mesa	LONEOS	EUN	2.6 km	MPC · JPL
172943	2005 JT_{88}	—	May 10, 2005	Mount Lemmon	Mount Lemmon Survey	·	4.3 km	MPC · JPL
172944	2005 JS_{104}	—	May 11, 2005	Anderson Mesa	LONEOS	·	4.3 km	MPC · JPL
172945	2005 JO_{125}	—	May 11, 2005	Catalina	CSS	·	2.2 km	MPC · JPL
172946	2005 JJ_{134}	—	May 14, 2005	Mount Lemmon	Mount Lemmon Survey	·	2.6 km	MPC · JPL
172947 Baeyens	2005 JQ_{138}	Baeyens	May 13, 2005	Mount Lemmon	Mount Lemmon Survey	·	3.0 km	MPC · JPL
172948	2005 JR_{164}	—	May 10, 2005	Socorro	LINEAR	·	3.2 km	MPC · JPL
172949	2005 JQ_{166}	—	May 11, 2005	Palomar	NEAT	HYG	4.6 km	MPC · JPL
172950	2005 JU_{166}	—	May 11, 2005	Palomar	NEAT	EOS	2.9 km	MPC · JPL
172951 Mehoke	2005 JN_{174}	Mehoke	May 11, 2005	Cerro Tololo	M. W. Buie	V	950 m	MPC · JPL
172952	2005 KC_{3}	—	May 17, 2005	Mount Lemmon	Mount Lemmon Survey	·	3.7 km	MPC · JPL
172953	2005 KG_{5}	—	May 18, 2005	Palomar	NEAT	KOR	1.9 km	MPC · JPL
172954	2005 KC_{6}	—	May 18, 2005	Palomar	NEAT	·	1.2 km	MPC · JPL
172955	2005 KR_{11}	—	May 30, 2005	Siding Spring	SSS	·	4.7 km	MPC · JPL
172956	2005 LZ_{1}	—	June 1, 2005	Kitt Peak	Spacewatch	·	3.3 km	MPC · JPL
172957	2005 LY_{8}	—	June 1, 2005	Mount Lemmon	Mount Lemmon Survey	·	2.9 km	MPC · JPL
172958	2005 LH_{11}	—	June 3, 2005	Kitt Peak	Spacewatch	·	6.2 km	MPC · JPL
172959	2005 LG_{19}	—	June 8, 2005	Kitt Peak	Spacewatch	·	4.1 km	MPC · JPL
172960	2005 LG_{37}	—	June 11, 2005	Kitt Peak	Spacewatch	·	2.2 km	MPC · JPL
172961	2005 MH_{2}	—	June 16, 2005	Mount Lemmon	Mount Lemmon Survey	·	5.0 km	MPC · JPL
172962	2005 MZ_{13}	—	June 28, 2005	Kitt Peak	Spacewatch	EOS	3.3 km	MPC · JPL
172963	2005 MY_{14}	—	June 29, 2005	Palomar	NEAT	·	5.8 km	MPC · JPL
172964	2005 MR_{34}	—	June 29, 2005	Palomar	NEAT	AGN	1.9 km	MPC · JPL
172965	2005 MX_{38}	—	June 30, 2005	Kitt Peak	Spacewatch	3:2	11 km	MPC · JPL
172966	2005 MC_{54}	—	June 23, 2005	Palomar	NEAT	T_{j} (2.98) · 3:2	8.6 km	MPC · JPL
172967	2005 NK_{55}	—	July 6, 2005	Reedy Creek	J. Broughton	EOS	3.6 km	MPC · JPL
172968	2005 NQ_{80}	—	July 14, 2005	Reedy Creek	J. Broughton	HYG	5.0 km	MPC · JPL
172969	2005 QA_{20}	—	August 26, 2005	Anderson Mesa	LONEOS	V	1.2 km	MPC · JPL
172970	2005 QD_{32}	—	August 24, 2005	Palomar	NEAT	·	5.8 km	MPC · JPL
172971	2005 QN_{176}	—	August 31, 2005	Campo Imperatore	CINEOS	·	8.3 km	MPC · JPL
172972	2005 SG_{13}	—	September 24, 2005	Kitt Peak	Spacewatch	·	2.6 km	MPC · JPL
172973	2005 SR_{167}	—	September 28, 2005	Palomar	NEAT	SYL · CYB	7.4 km	MPC · JPL
172974	2005 YW_{55}	—	December 28, 2005	Catalina	CSS	AMO	470 m	MPC · JPL
172975	2006 DY_{6}	—	February 20, 2006	Catalina	CSS	·	1.3 km	MPC · JPL
172976	2006 DC_{113}	—	February 27, 2006	Kitt Peak	Spacewatch	PHO	4.5 km	MPC · JPL
172977	2006 DK_{116}	—	February 27, 2006	Kitt Peak	Spacewatch	·	1.6 km	MPC · JPL
172978	2006 HB_{8}	—	April 18, 2006	Kitt Peak	Spacewatch	·	1.7 km	MPC · JPL
172979	2006 HT_{25}	—	April 20, 2006	Kitt Peak	Spacewatch	·	1.5 km	MPC · JPL
172980	2006 HG_{26}	—	April 20, 2006	Kitt Peak	Spacewatch	·	3.7 km	MPC · JPL
172981	2006 HN_{30}	—	April 21, 2006	Catalina	CSS	·	1.4 km	MPC · JPL
172982	2006 HZ_{60}	—	April 28, 2006	Socorro	LINEAR	·	1.3 km	MPC · JPL
172983	2006 HD_{71}	—	April 25, 2006	Kitt Peak	Spacewatch	·	1.1 km	MPC · JPL
172984	2006 HK_{89}	—	April 20, 2006	Socorro	LINEAR	·	2.5 km	MPC · JPL
172985 Ericmelin	2006 HW_{147}	Ericmelin	April 27, 2006	Cerro Tololo	M. W. Buie	MAS	640 m	MPC · JPL
172986	2006 JE_{36}	—	May 4, 2006	Kitt Peak	Spacewatch	·	740 m	MPC · JPL
172987	2006 KP_{28}	—	May 20, 2006	Kitt Peak	Spacewatch	·	1.1 km	MPC · JPL
172988	2006 KQ_{48}	—	May 21, 2006	Kitt Peak	Spacewatch	·	2.0 km	MPC · JPL
172989 Xuliyang	2006 KW_{67}	Xuliyang	May 25, 2006	Lulin Observatory	Q. Ye, Lin, H.-C.	·	1.2 km	MPC · JPL
172990	2006 KV_{81}	—	May 25, 2006	Mount Lemmon	Mount Lemmon Survey	PHO	1.4 km	MPC · JPL
172991	2006 KR_{114}	—	May 26, 2006	Palomar	NEAT	(32418) ·	2.3 km	MPC · JPL
172992	2006 KW_{116}	—	May 29, 2006	Kitt Peak	Spacewatch	·	1.8 km	MPC · JPL
172993	2006 KV_{118}	—	May 30, 2006	Kitt Peak	Spacewatch	·	2.8 km	MPC · JPL
172994	2006 KE_{122}	—	May 24, 2006	Palomar	NEAT	TIR	5.1 km	MPC · JPL
172995	2006 KN_{122}	—	May 28, 2006	Socorro	LINEAR	·	2.1 km	MPC · JPL
172996 Stooke	2006 KL_{141}	Stooke	May 25, 2006	Mauna Kea	P. A. Wiegert	·	2.5 km	MPC · JPL
172997	2006 LO_{1}	—	June 4, 2006	Mount Lemmon	Mount Lemmon Survey	(2076)	1.4 km	MPC · JPL
172998	2006 LT_{6}	—	June 5, 2006	Socorro	LINEAR	·	1.8 km	MPC · JPL
172999	2006 MF_{2}	—	June 16, 2006	Kitt Peak	Spacewatch	V	800 m	MPC · JPL
173000	2006 MT_{3}	—	June 16, 2006	Palomar	NEAT	·	1.5 km	MPC · JPL

back to top

== See also ==
- Meanings of minor-planet names: 172001–173000
