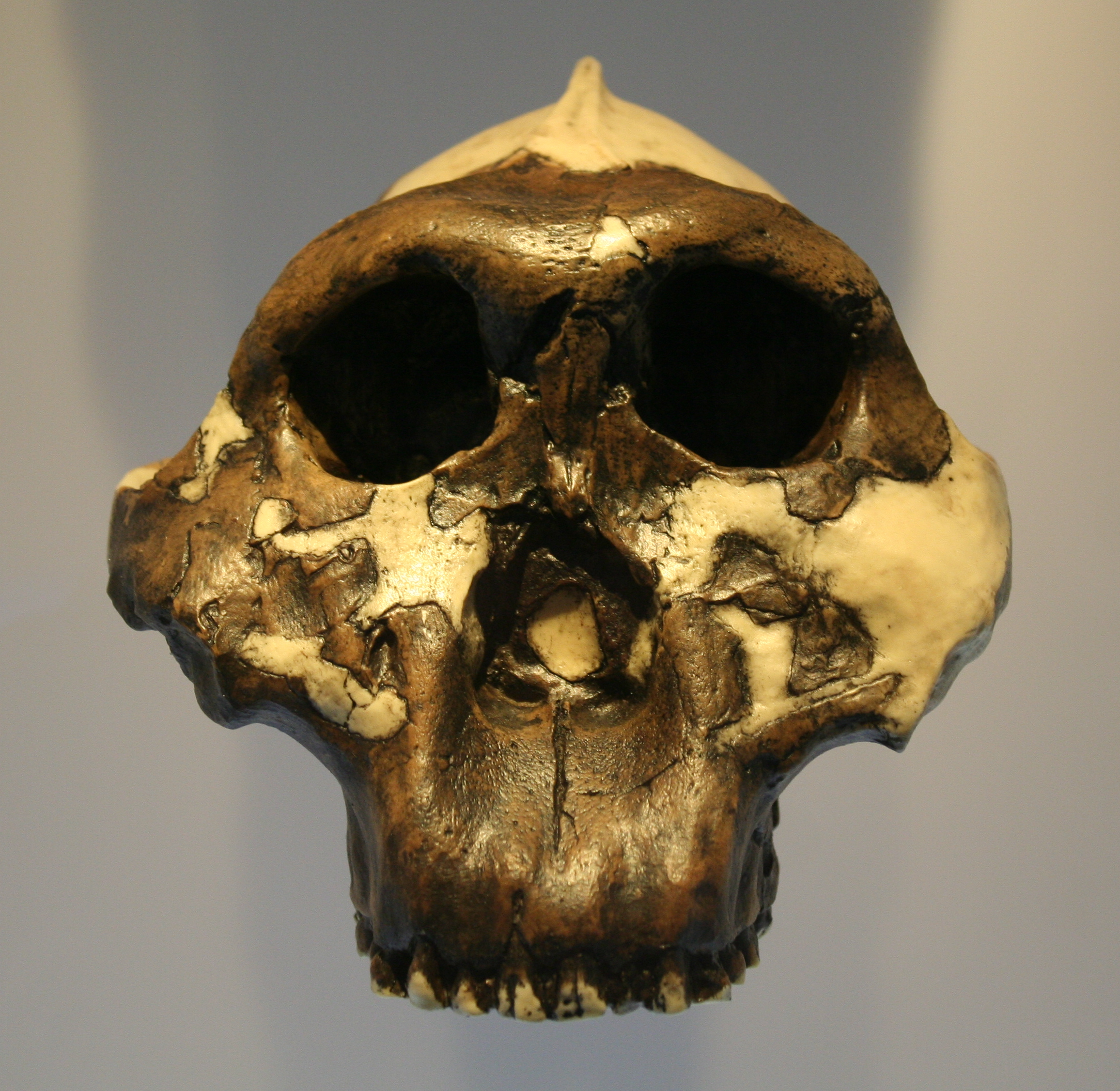
- Skull of P. boisei (MGL 95211)

Scientific classification
- Kingdom: Animalia
- Phylum: Chordata
- Class: Mammalia
- Order: Primates
- Superfamily: Hominoidea
- Family: Hominidae
- Subfamily: Homininae
- Tribe: Hominini
- Subtribe: Australopithecina
- Genus: †Paranthropus; Broom, 1938

Type species
- †Paranthropus robustus Broom, 1938

Species
- †P. aethiopicus; †P. boisei; †P. capensis?; †P. robustus

Synonyms
- Paraustralopithecus Arambourg and Coppens, 1968; Zinjanthropus Leakey, 1959

= Paranthropus =

Paranthropus Temporal range: Piacenzian–Chibanian, 2.9–1.2 Ma

Contested extinct genus of hominins

Paranthropus is a genus of extinct hominin which contains three widely accepted species: P. aethiopicus, P. robustus and P. boisei. However, the validity of Paranthropus is contested, and it is sometimes considered to be synonymous with Australopithecus. They are also referred to as the robust australopithecines. They lived between approximately 2.9 and at least 1.2 million years ago (mya) from the end of the Pliocene to the Middle Pleistocene.

Paranthropus is characterised by robust skulls, with a prominent gorilla-like sagittal crest along the midline—which suggest strong chewing muscles—and broad, herbivorous teeth used for grinding. Typically, Paranthropus species were generalist feeders, but while P. robustus was likely an omnivore, P. boisei seems to have been herbivorous, possibly preferring abundant bulbotubers. Paranthropoids were bipeds. Despite their robust heads, they had comparatively small bodies. Average weight and height are estimated to be 40 kg (88 lb) at 132 cm (4 ft) for P. robustus males, 50 kg (110 lb) at 137 cm (4 ft 6 in) for P. boisei males, 32 kg (71 lb) at 110 cm (3 ft 7 in) for P. robustus females, and 34 kg (75 lb) at 124 cm (4 ft 1 in) for P. boisei females.

They were possibly polygamous and patrilocal, but there are no modern analogues for australopithecine societies. They are associated with bone tools and contested as the earliest evidence of fire usage. They typically inhabited woodlands, and coexisted with some early human species, namely A. africanus, H. habilis and H. erectus. They were preyed upon by the large carnivores of the time, specifically crocodiles, leopards, sabertoothed cats and hyenas.

== Taxonomy ==
=== Species ===
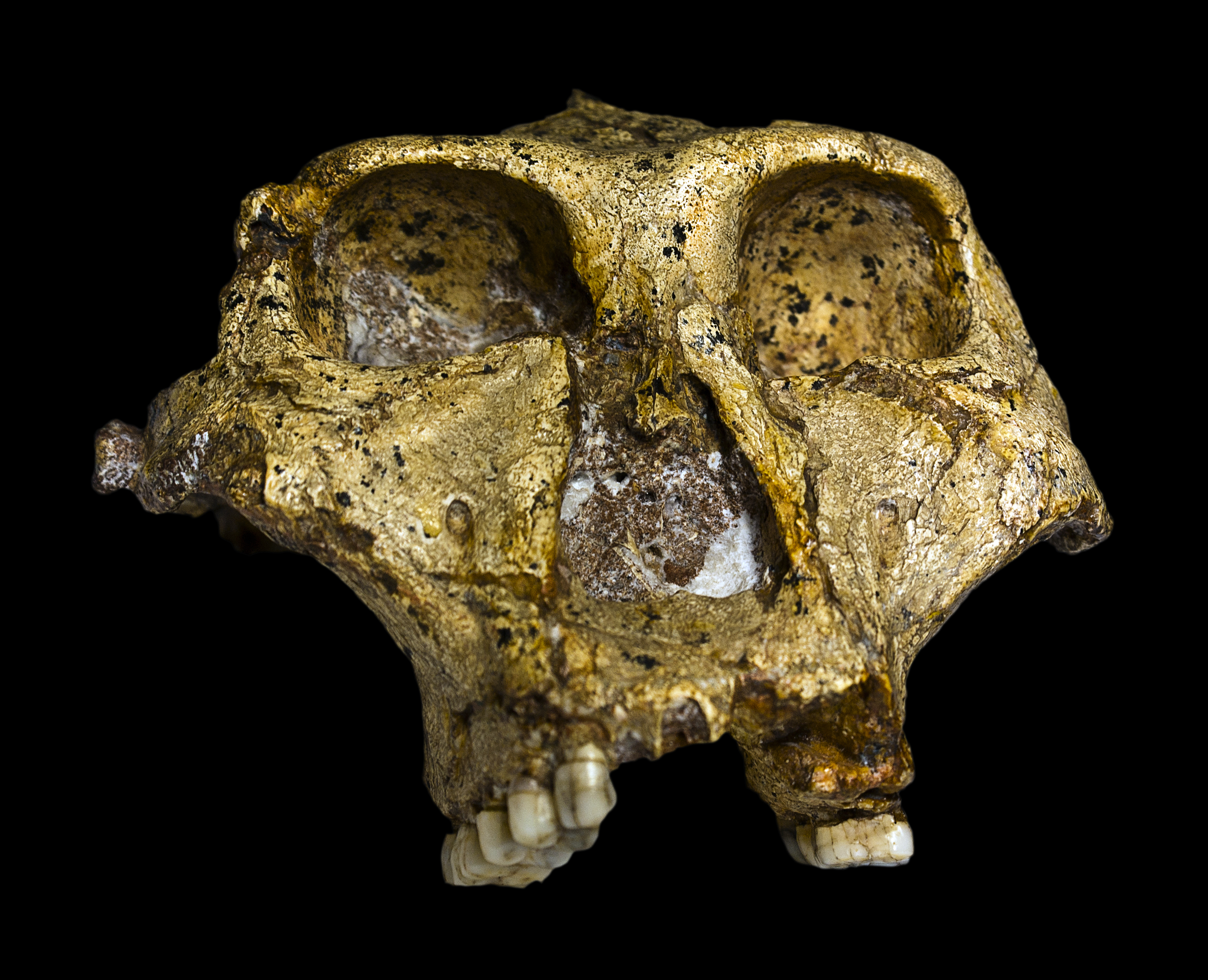
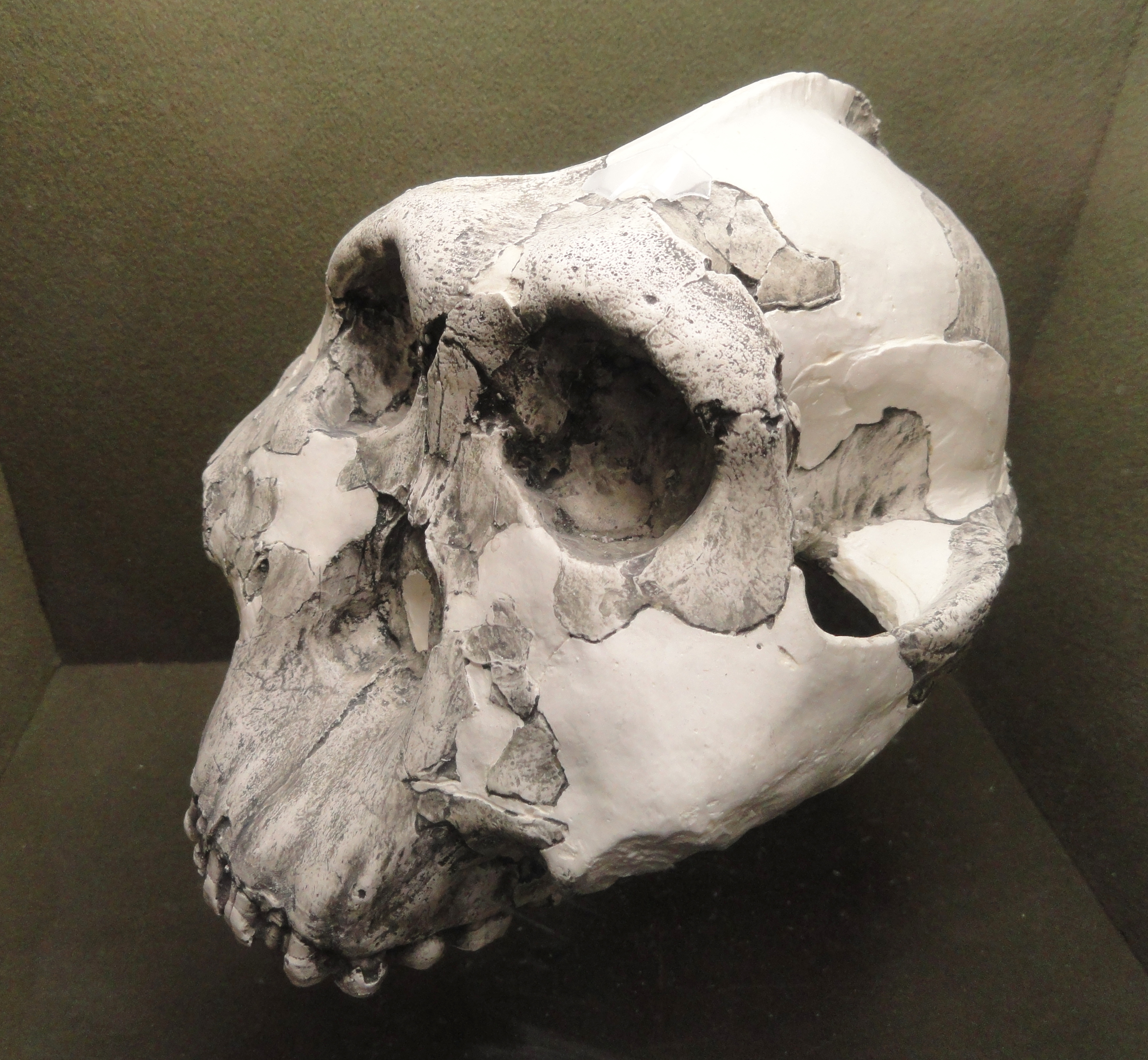
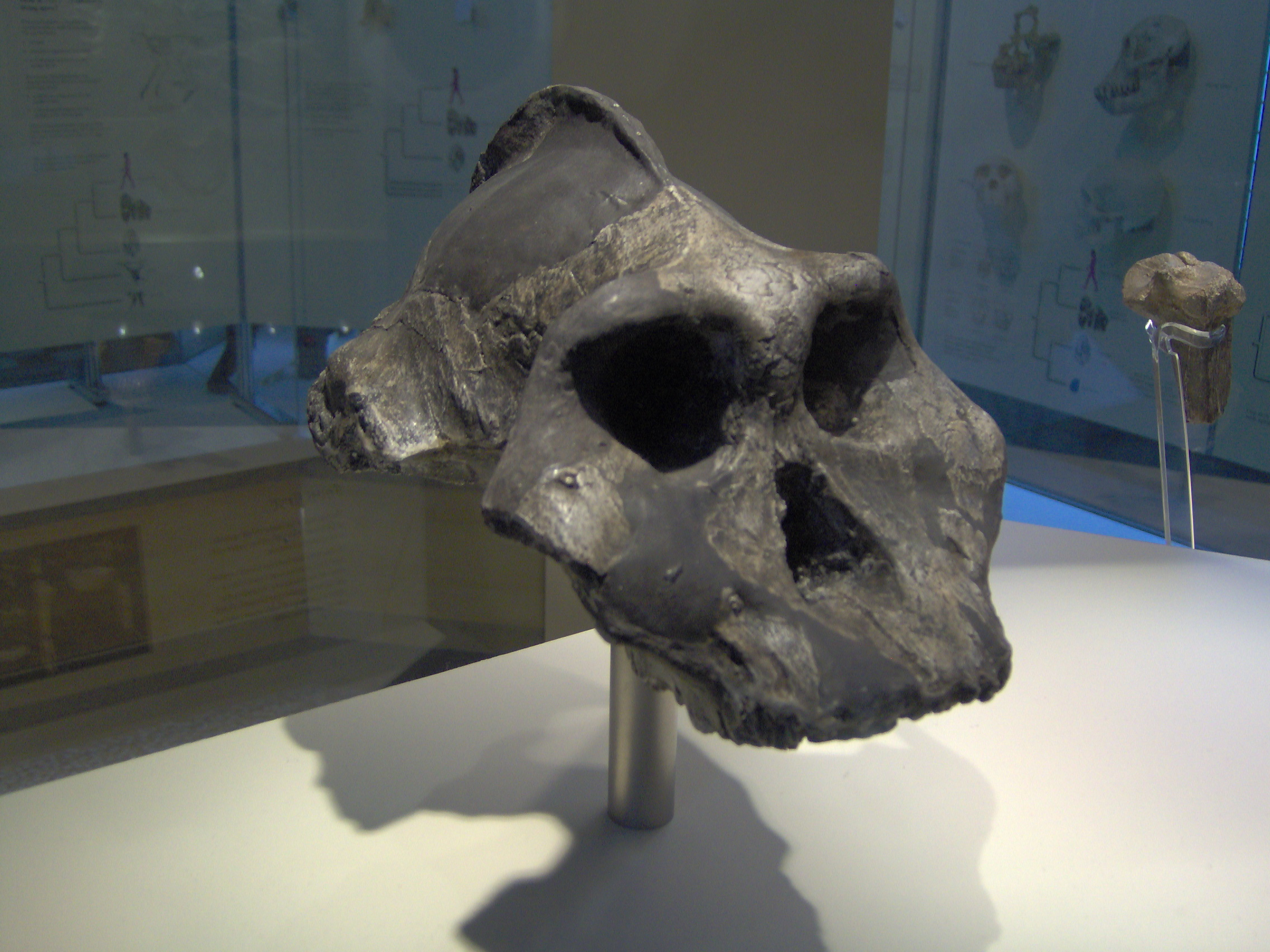
From top to bottom, P. robustus (SK 48), P. boisei (OH 5) and P. aethiopicus (KNM WT 17000)

Selected Paranthropus sites from the ROAD database (CC BY-SA 4.0 ROCEEH)

==== P. robustus ====
The genus Paranthropus was first erected by Scottish-South African palaeontologist Robert Broom in 1938, with the type species P. robustus. "Paranthropus" derives from Ancient Greek παρα para beside or alongside; and άνθρωπος ánthropos man. The type specimen, a male braincase, TM 1517, was discovered by schoolboy Gert Terblanche at the Kromdraai fossil site, about 70 km (43 mi) southwest of Pretoria, South Africa. By 1988, at least six individuals were unearthed in around the same area, now known as the Cradle of Humankind.

In 1948, at Swartkrans Cave, in about the same vicinity as Kromdraai, Broom and South African palaeontologist John Talbot Robinson described P. crassidens based on a subadult jaw, SK 6. He believed later Paranthropus were morphologically distinct from earlier Paranthropus in the cave—that is, the Swartkrans Paranthropus were reproductively isolated from Kromdraai Paranthropus and the former eventually speciated. By 1988, several specimens from Swartkrans had been placed into P. crassidens. However, this has since been synonymised with P. robustus as the two populations do not seem to be very distinct.

==== P. boisei ====
In 1959, P. boisei was discovered by Mary Leakey at Olduvai Gorge, Tanzania (specimen OH 5). Her husband Louis named it Zinjanthropus boisei because he believed it differed greatly from Paranthropus and Australopithecus. The name derives from "Zinj", an ancient Arabic word for the coast of East Africa, and "boisei", referring to their financial benefactor Charles Watson Boise. However, this genus was rejected at Mr. Leakey's presentation before the 4th Pan-African Congress on Prehistory, as it was based on a single specimen. The discovery of the Peninj Mandible made the Leakeys reclassify their species as Australopithecus (Zinjanthropus) boisei in 1964, but in 1967, South African palaeoanthropologist Phillip V. Tobias subsumed it into Australopithecus as A. boisei. However, as more specimens were found, the combination Paranthropus boisei became more popular.

It is debated whether the wide range of variation in jaw size indicates simply sexual dimorphism or a grounds for identifying a new species. It could be explained as groundmass filling in cracks naturally formed after death, inflating the perceived size of the bone. P. boisei also has a notably wide range of variation in skull anatomy, but these features likely have no taxonomic bearing.

==== P. aethiopicus ====
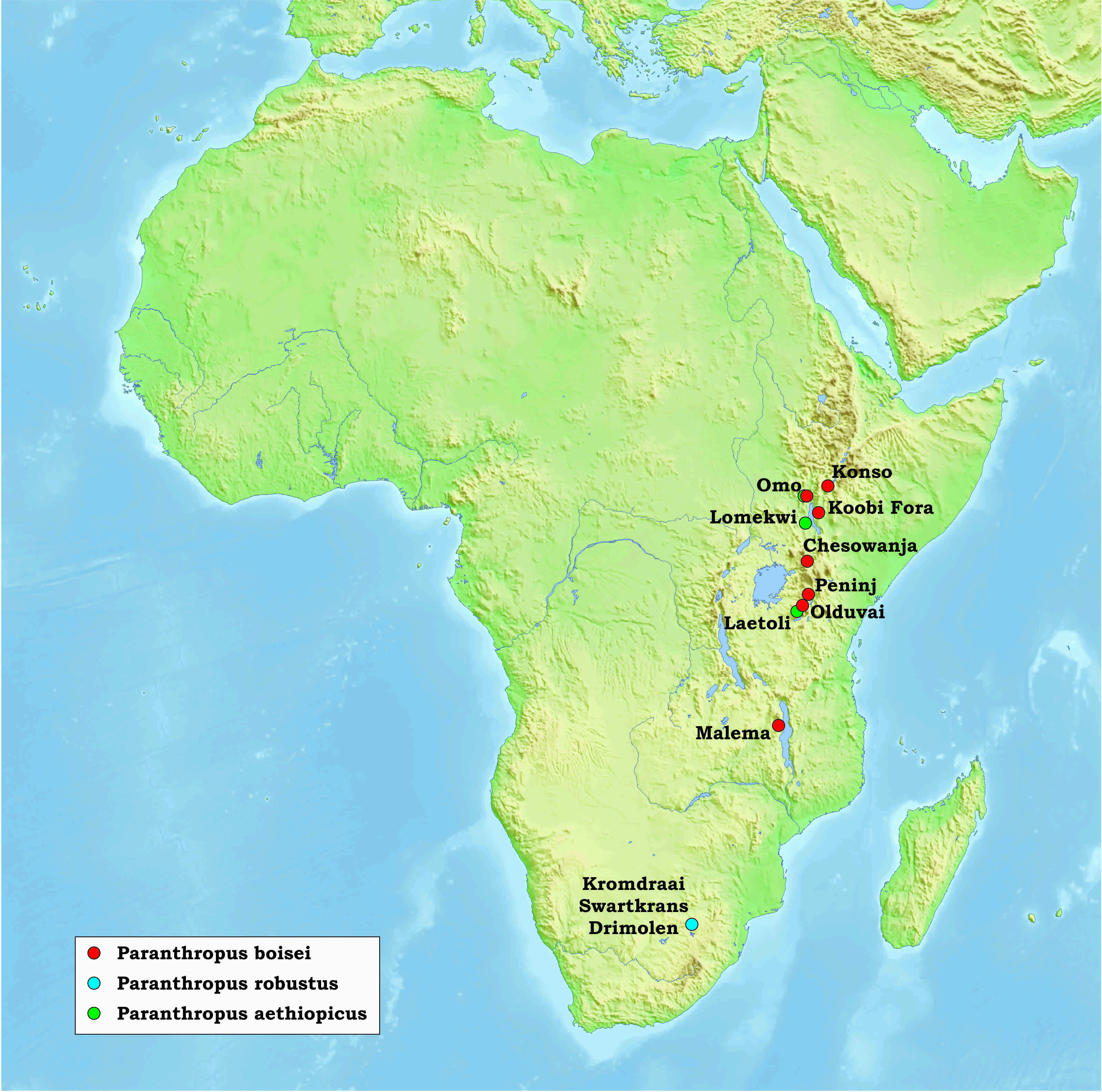
Locations of Paranthropus finds

In 1968, French palaeontologists Camille Arambourg and Yves Coppens described "Paraustralopithecus aethiopicus" based on a toothless mandible from the Shungura Formation, Ethiopia (Omo 18). In 1976, American anthropologist Francis Clark Howell and Breton anthropologist Yves Coppens reclassified it as A. africanus. In 1986, after the discovery of the skull KNM WT 17000 by English anthropologist Alan Walker and Richard Leakey, the specimen was classified into Paranthropus as P. aethiopicus. There is debate whether this is synonymous with P. boisei, the main argument for separation being the skull seems less adapted for chewing tough vegetation.

In 1989, palaeoartist and zoologist Walter Ferguson reclassified KNM WT 17000 into a new species, walkeri, because he considered the skull's species designation questionable as it comprised the skull whereas the holotype of P. aethiopicus comprised only the mandible. Ferguson's classification is almost universally ignored, and is considered to be synonymous with P. aethiopicus.

==== Others ====
In 2015, Ethiopian palaeoanthropologist Yohannes Haile-Selassie and colleagues described the 3.5–3.2 Ma A. deyiremeda based on three jawbones from the Afar Region, Ethiopia. They noted that, though it shares many similarities with Paranthropus, it may not have been closely related because it lacked enlarged molars which characterize the genus. Nonetheless, in 2018, independent researcher Johan Nygren recommended moving it to Paranthropus based on dental and presumed dietary similarity.

A 1.4 million year old jaw, designated "SK 15" that was discovered in 1949 in Swartkrans, initially named Telanthropus capensis and later attributed to Homo ergaster was suggested to belong to the genus Parathropus by palaeoanthropologist Clément Zanolli, based on high-resolution X-ray scans and virtual 3D modeling.

=== Validity ===
In 1951, American anthropologists Sherwood Washburn and Bruce D. Patterson were the first to suggest that Paranthropus should be considered a junior synonym of Australopithecus as the former was only known from fragmentary remains at the time, and dental differences were too minute to serve as justification. In face of calls for subsumation, Leakey and Robinson continued defending its validity. Various other authors were still unsure until more complete remains were found. Paranthropus is sometimes classified as a subgenus of Australopithecus.

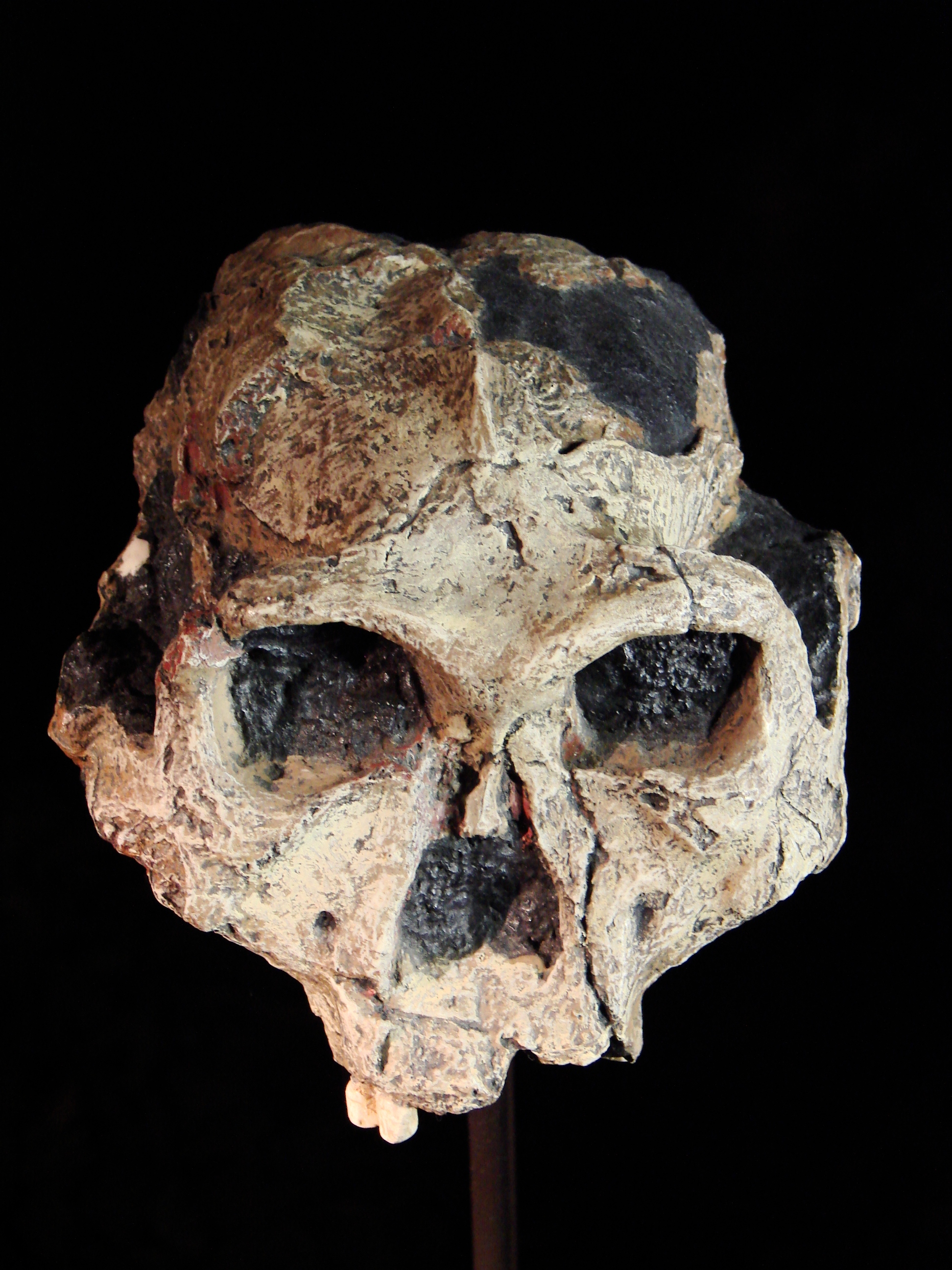
P. robustus (SK 48)

There is currently no clear consensus on the validity of Paranthropus. The argument rests upon whether the genus is monophyletic—is composed of a common ancestor and all of its descendants—and the argument against monophyly (that the genus is paraphyletic) says that P. robustus and P. boisei evolved similar gorilla-like heads independently of each other by coincidence (convergent evolution), as chewing adaptations in hominins evolve very rapidly and multiple times at various points in the family tree (homoplasy). In 1999, a chimp-like ulna forearm bone was assigned to P. boisei, the first discovered ulna of the species, which was markedly different from P. robustus ulnae, which could suggest paraphyly.

=== Evolution ===
P. aethiopicus is the earliest member of the genus, with the oldest remains, from the Ethiopian Omo Kibish Formation, dated to 2.6 mya at the end of the Pliocene. It is sometimes regarded as the direct ancestor of P. boisei and P. robustus. It is possible that P. aethiopicus evolved even earlier, up to 3.3 mya, on the expansive Kenyan floodplains of the time. The oldest P. boisei remains date to about 2.3 mya from Malema, Malawi. P. boisei changed remarkably little over its nearly one-million-year existence. Paranthropus had spread into South Africa by 2 mya with the earliest P. robustus remains.

It is sometimes suggested that Paranthropus and Homo are sister taxa, both evolving from Australopithecus. This may have occurred during a drying trend 2.8–2.5 mya in the Great Rift Valley, which caused the retreat of woodland environments in favor of open savanna, with forests growing only along rivers and lakes. Homo evolved in the former, and Paranthropus in the latter riparian environment. However, the classifications of Australopithecus species is problematic.

According to a 2025 study of palaeoproteomics of Paranthropus teeth from Swartkrans Cave was able to assign the individual teeth to sex and identify patterns of diversity suggesting the existence of multiple populations.

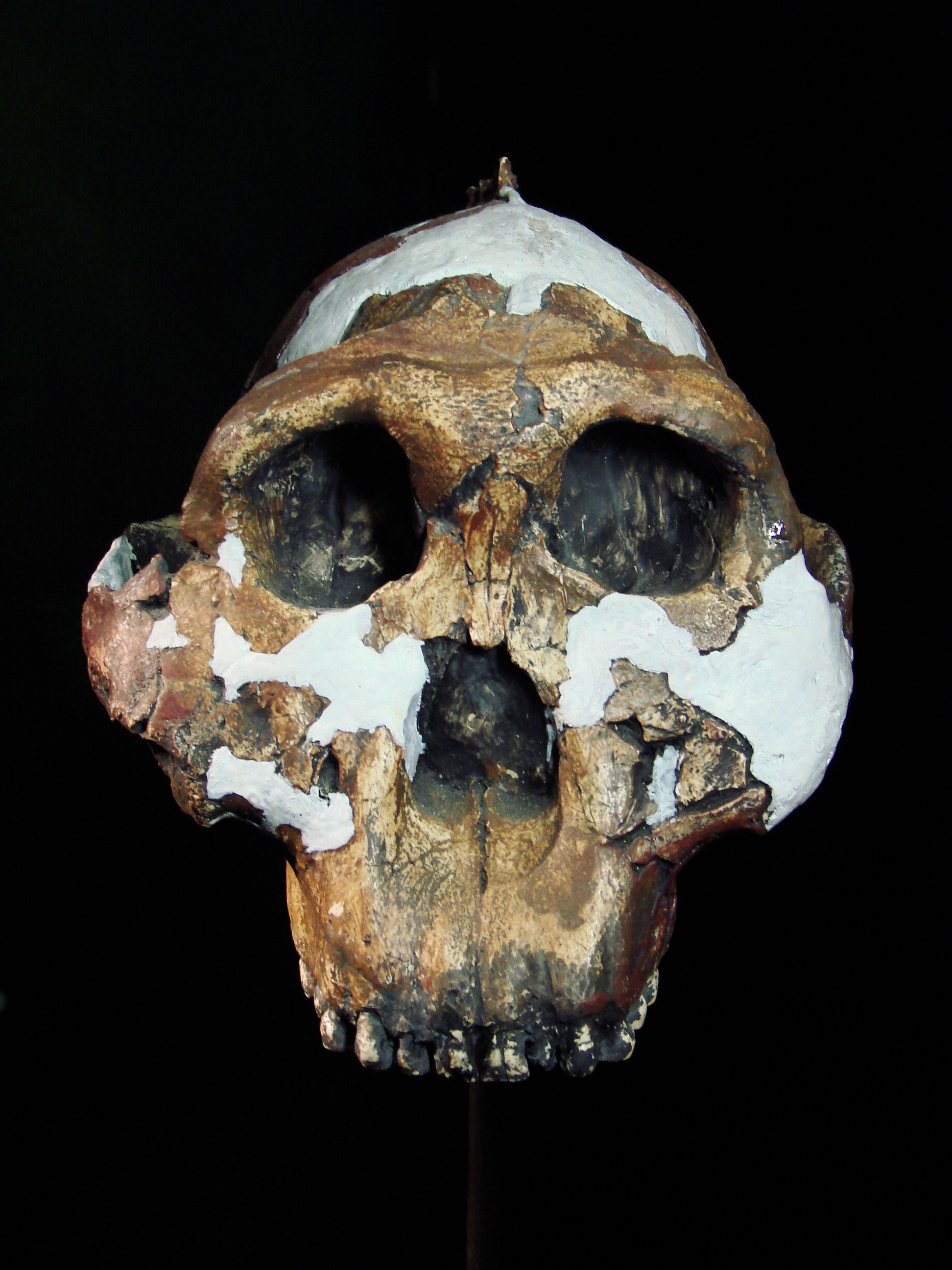
P. boisei OH 5

Evolutionary tree according to a 2019 study:

- Hominini
  - Chimpanzee
  - Sahelanthropus
    - - Ardipithecus
      - A. anamensis
        A. afarensis
    - - Paranthropus
        - P. aethiopicus
        - - P. boisei
          - P. robustus
      - - A. africanus
        - A. garhi
          - H. floresiensis
          - - A. sediba
            - - H. habilis
              - Other Homo

== Description ==
=== Skull ===
Paranthropus had a massively built, tall and flat skull, with a prominent gorilla-like sagittal crest along the midline which anchored large temporalis muscles used in chewing. Like other australopithecines, Paranthropus exhibited sexual dimorphism, with males notably larger than females. They had large molars with a relatively thick tooth enamel coating (post-canine megadontia), and comparatively small incisors (similar in size to modern humans), possibly adaptations to processing abrasive foods. The teeth of P. aethiopicus developed faster than those of P. boisei.

Paranthropus had adaptations to the skull to resist large bite loads while feeding, namely the expansive squamosal sutures. The notably thick palate was once thought to have been an adaptation to resist a high bite force, but is better explained as a byproduct of facial lengthening and nasal anatomy.

In P. boisei, the jaw hinge was adapted to grinding food side-to-side (rather than up-and-down in modern humans), which is better at processing the starchy abrasive foods that likely made up the bulk of its diet. P. robustus may have chewed in a front-to-back direction instead, and had less exaggerated (less derived) anatomical features than P. boisei as it perhaps did not require them with this kind of chewing strategy. This may have also allowed P. robustus to better process tougher foods.

The braincase volume averaged about 500 cm^{3} (31 cu in), comparable to gracile australopithecines, but smaller than Homo. Modern human brain volume averages 1,270 cm^{3} (78 cu in) for men and 1,130 cm^{3} (69 cu in) for women.

=== Limbs and locomotion ===
Unlike P. robustus, the forearms of P. boisei were heavily built, which might suggest habitual suspensory behaviour as in orangutans and gibbons. A P. boisei shoulder blade indicates long infraspinatus muscles, which is also associated with suspensory behavior. A P. aethiopicus ulna, on the other hand, shows more similarities to Homo than P. boisei.

Paranthropus were bipeds, and their hips, legs and feet resemble A. afarensis and modern humans. The pelvis is similar to A. afarensis, but the hip joints are smaller in P. robustus. The physical similarity implies a similar walking gait. Their modern-humanlike big toe indicates a modern-humanlike foot posture and range of motion, but the more distal ankle joint would have inhibited the modern human toe-off gait cycle. By 1.8 mya, Paranthropus and H. habilis may have achieved about the same grade of bipedality.

=== Height and weight ===
In comparison to the large, robust head, the body was rather small. Average weight for P. robustus may have been 40 kg (88 lb) for males and 32 kg (71 lb) for females; and for P. boisei 50 kg (110 lb) for males and 34 kg (75 lb) for females. At Swartkrans Cave Members 1 and 2, about 35% of the P. robustus individuals are estimated to have weighed 28 kg (62 lb), 22% about 43 kg (95 lb), and the remaining 43% bigger than the former but less than 54 kg (119 lb). At Member 3, all individuals were about 45 kg (99 lb). Female weight was about the same in contemporaneous H. erectus, but male H. erectus were on average 13 kg (28.7 lb) heavier than P. robustus males. P. robustus sites are oddly dominated by small adults, which could be explained as heightened predation or mortality of the larger males of a group. The largest-known Paranthropus individual was estimated at 54 kg (119 lb).

According to a 1991 study, based on femur length and using the dimensions of modern humans, male and female P. robustus are estimated to have stood on average 132 and 110 cm (4 ft 4 in and 3 ft 7 in), respectively, and P. boisei 137 and 124 cm (4 ft 6 in and 4 ft 1 in). However, the latter estimates are problematic as there were no positively identified male P. boisei femurs at the time. In 2013, a 1.34 Ma male P. boisei partial skeleton was estimated to be at least 156 cm (5 ft 1 in) and 50 kg (110 lb).

=== Pathology ===
Paranthropus seems to have had notably high rates of pitting enamel hypoplasia (PEH), where tooth enamel formation is spotty instead of mostly uniform. In P. robustus, about 47% of baby teeth and 14% of adult teeth were affected, in comparison to about 6.7% and 4.3%, respectively, in any other tested hominin species. The condition of these holes covering the entire tooth is consistent with the modern human ailment amelogenesis imperfecta. However, since circular holes in enamel coverage are uniform in size, only present on the molar teeth, and have the same severity across individuals, the PEH may have been a genetic condition. It is possible that the coding-DNA concerned with thickening enamel also left them more vulnerable to PEH.

There have been 10 identified cases of cavities in P. robustus, indicating a rate similar to modern humans. A molar from Drimolen, South Africa, showed a cavity on the tooth root, a rare occurrence in fossil great apes. In order for cavity-creating bacteria to reach this area, the individual would have had to have also presented either alveolar resorption, which is commonly associated with gum disease; or super-eruption of teeth which occurs when teeth become worn down and have to erupt a bit more in order to maintain a proper bite, and this exposed the root. The latter is most likely, and the exposed root seems to have caused hypercementosis to anchor the tooth in place. The cavity seems to have been healing, which may have been caused by a change in diet or mouth microbiome, or the loss of the adjacent molar.

== Palaeobiology ==
=== Diet ===
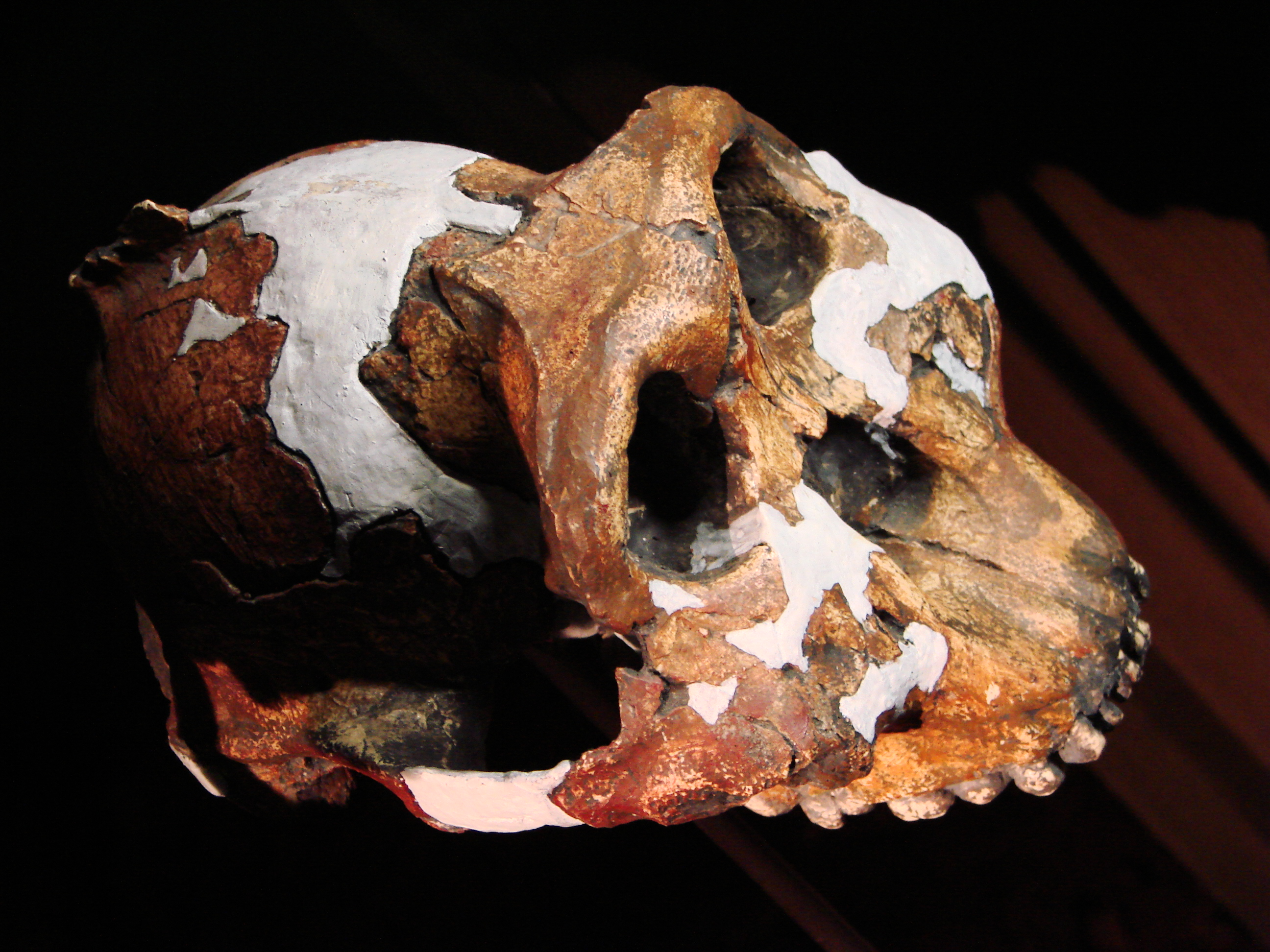
P. boisei OH 5

It was once thought P. boisei cracked open nuts with its powerful teeth, giving OH 5 the nickname "Nutcracker Man". However, like gorillas, Paranthropus likely preferred soft foods, but would consume tough or hard food during leaner times, and the powerful jaws were used only in the latter situation. In P. boisei, thick enamel was more likely used to resist abrasive gritty particles rather than to minimize chipping while eating hard foods. In fact, there is a distinct lack of tooth fractures which would have resulted from such activity.

Paranthropus were generalist feeders, but diet seems to have ranged dramatically with location. The South African P. robustus appears to have been an omnivore, with a diet similar to contemporaneous Homo and nearly identical to the later H. ergaster, and subsisted on mainly C4 savanna plants and C3 forest plants, which could indicate either seasonal shifts in diet or seasonal migration from forest to savanna. In leaner times it may have fallen back on brittle food. It likely also consumed seeds and possibly tubers or termites. A high cavity rate could indicate honey consumption.

The East African P. boisei, on the other hand, seems to have been largely herbivorous and fed on C4 plants. Its powerful jaws allowed it to consume a wide variety of different plants, though it may have largely preferred nutrient-rich bulbotubers as these are known to thrive in the well-watered woodlands it is thought to have inhabited. Feeding on these, P. boisei may have been able to meet its daily caloric requirements of approximately 9,700 kJ after about 6 hours of foraging.

Juvenile P. robustus may have relied more on tubers than adults, given the elevated levels of strontium compared to adults in teeth from Swartkrans Cave, which, in the area, was most likely sourced from tubers. Dentin exposure on juvenile teeth could indicate early weaning, or a more abrasive diet than adults which wore away the cementum and enamel coatings, or both. It is also possible juveniles were less capable of removing grit from dug-up food rather than purposefully seeking out more abrasive foods.

=== Technology ===
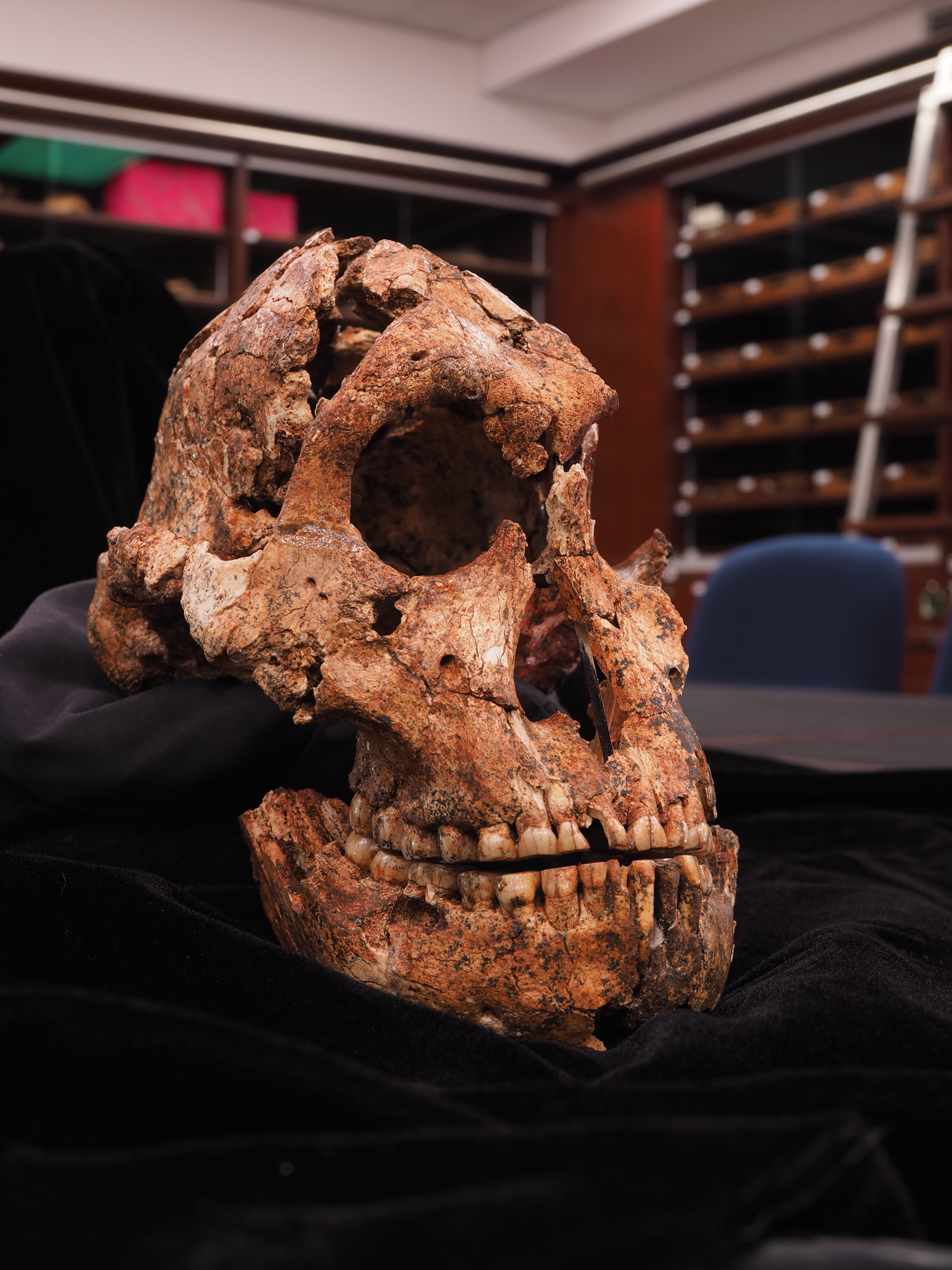
DNH 7, the most complete P. robustus skull known until the description of DNH155 in 2020

Oldowan toolkits were uncovered at an excavation site on the Homa Peninsula in western Kenya. Stone tools called "oldowan toolkits" are used to pound and shape other rocks or plant materials. These tools are thought to be between 2.6 and 3 million years old. The stone tools were found near Paranthropus teeth.

Bone tools dating between 2.3 and 0.6 mya have been found in abundance in Swartkrans, Kromdraai and Drimolen caves, and are often associated with P. robustus. Though Homo is also known from these caves, their remains are comparatively scarce to Paranthropus, making Homo-attribution unlikely. The tools also cooccur with Homo-associated Oldawan and possibly Acheulian stone tool industries. The bone tools were typically sourced from the shaft of long bones from medium- to large-sized mammals, but tools sourced from mandibles, ribs and horn cores have also been found. Bone tools have also been found at Oldawan Gorge and directly associated with P. boisei, the youngest dating to 1.34 mya, though a great proportion of other bone tools from here have ambiguous attribution. Stone tools from Kromdraai could possibly be attributed to P. robustus, as no Homo have been found there yet.

The bone tools were not manufactured or purposefully shaped for a task. However, since the bones display no weathering (and were not scavenged randomly), and there is a preference displayed for certain bones, raw materials were likely specifically hand-picked. This could indicate a similar cognitive ability to contemporary Stone Age Homo.

Bone tools may have been used to cut or process vegetation, or dig up tubers or termites, The form of P. robustus incisors appear to be intermediate between H. erectus and modern humans, which could indicate less food processing done by the teeth due to preparation with simple tools.

Burnt bones were also associated with the inhabitants of Swartkrans, which could indicate some of the earliest fire usage. However, these bones were found in Member 3, where Paranthropus remains are rarer than H. erectus, and it is also possible the bones were burned in a wildfire and washed into the cave as it is known the bones were not burned onsite.

=== Social structure ===
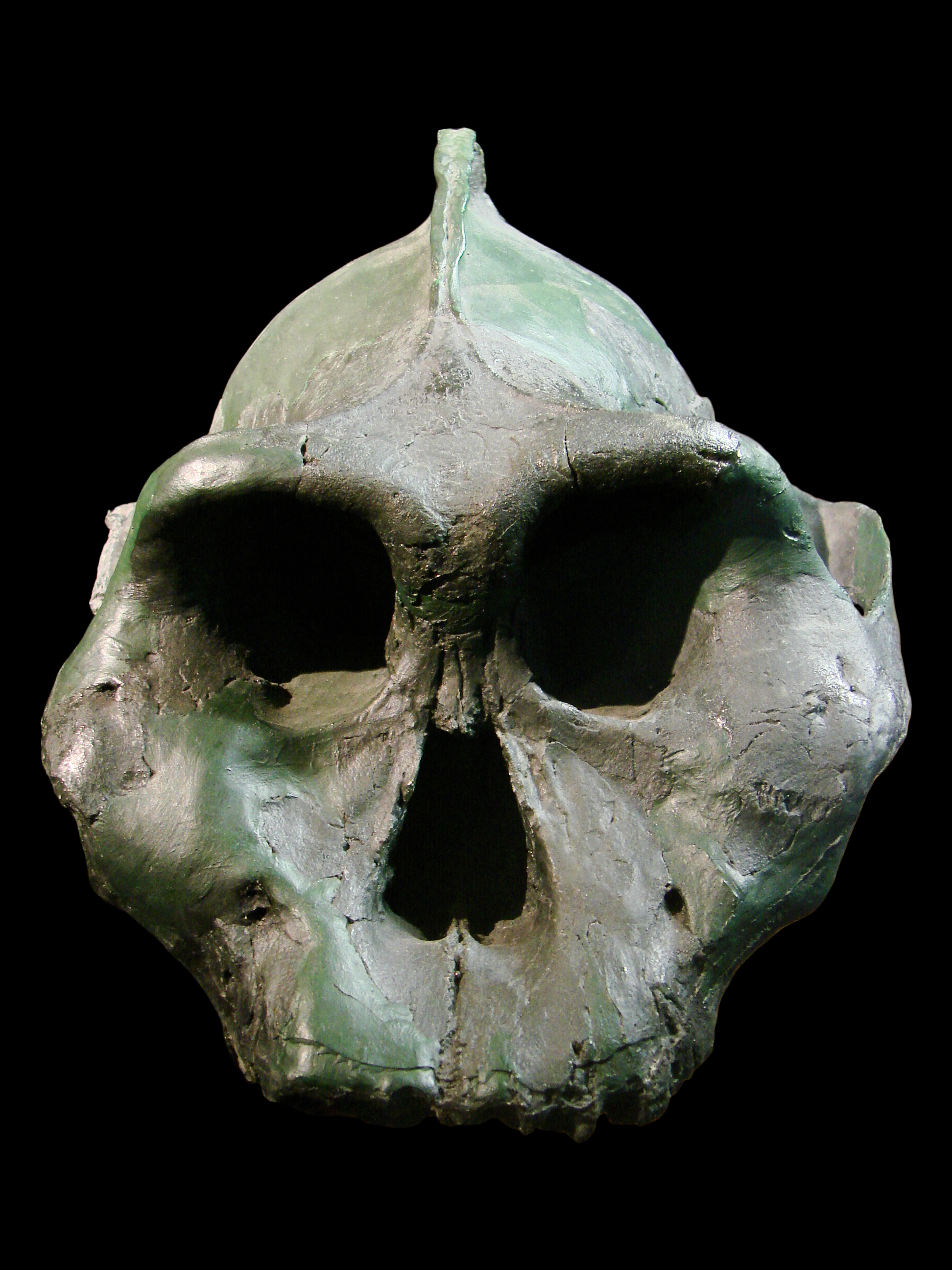
P. aethiopicus KNM WT 17000

Given the marked anatomical and physical differences with modern great apes, there may be no modern analogue for australopithecine societies, so comparisons drawn with modern primates will not be entirely accurate.

Paranthropus had pronounced sexual dimorphism, with males notably larger than females, which is commonly correlated with a male-dominated polygamous society. P. robustus may have had a harem society similar to modern forest-dwelling silverback gorillas, where one male has exclusive breeding rights to a group of females, as male-female size disparity is comparable to gorillas (based on facial dimensions), and younger males were less robust than older males (delayed maturity is also exhibited in gorillas).

However, if P. robustus preferred a savanna habitat, a multi-male society would have been more productive to better defend the troop from predators in the more exposed environment, much like savanna baboons. Further, among primates, delayed maturity is also exhibited in the rhesus monkey which has a multi-male society, and may not be an accurate indicator of social structure.

A 2011 strontium isotope study of P. robustus teeth from the dolomite Sterkfontein Valley found that, like other hominins, but unlike other great apes, P. robustus females were more likely to leave their place of birth (patrilocal). This also discounts the plausibility of a harem society, which would have resulted in a matrilocal society due to heightened male–male competition. Males did not seem to have ventured very far from the valley, which could either indicate small home ranges, or that they preferred dolomitic landscapes due to perhaps cave abundance or factors related to vegetation growth.

=== Life history ===
Dental development seems to have followed about the same timeframe as it does in modern humans and most other hominins, but, since Paranthropus molars are markedly larger, rate of tooth eruption would have been accelerated. Their life history may have mirrored that of gorillas as they have the same brain volume, which (depending on the subspecies) reach physical maturity from 12–18 years and have birthing intervals of 40–70 months.

== Palaeoecology ==
=== Habitat ===
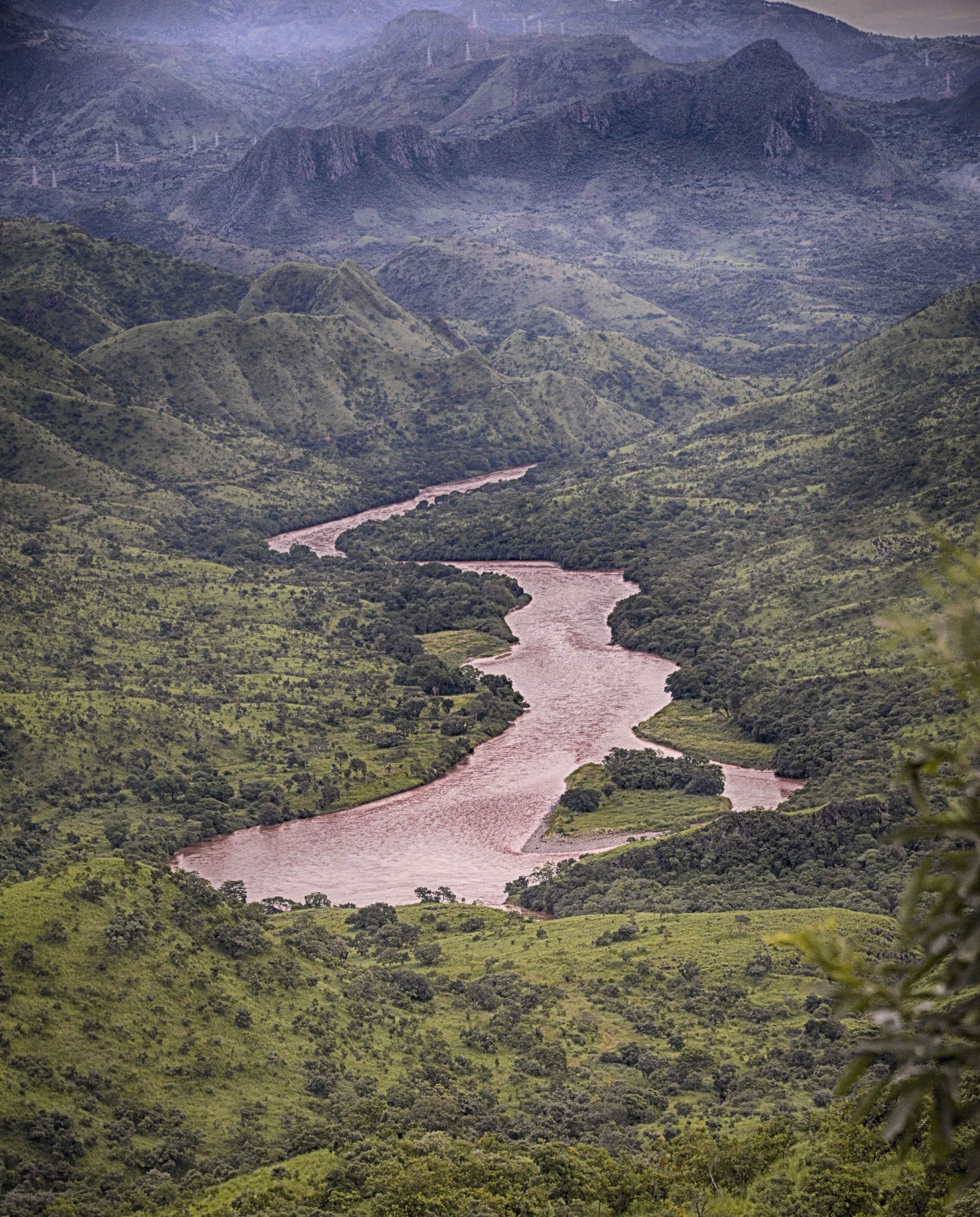
Modern-day Omo River Valley

It is generally thought that Paranthropus preferred to inhabit wooded, riverine landscapes. The teeth of Paranthropus, H. habilis and H. erectus are all known from various overlapping beds in East Africa, such as at Olduvai Gorge and the Turkana Basin. P. robustus and H. erectus also appear to have coexisted.

P. boisei, known from the Great Rift Valley, may have typically inhabited wetlands along lakes and rivers, wooded or arid shrublands, and semiarid woodlands, though their presence in the savanna-dominated Malawian Chiwondo Beds implies they could tolerate a range of habitats. During the Pleistocene, there seem to have been coastal and montane forests in Eastern Africa. More expansive river valleys—namely the Omo River Valley—may have served as important refuges for forest-dwelling creatures. Being cut off from the forests of Central Africa by a savanna corridor, these East African forests would have promoted high rates of endemism, especially during times of climatic volatility.

The Cradle of Humankind, the only area P. robustus is known from, was mainly dominated by the springbok Antidorcas recki, but other antelope, giraffes and elephants were also seemingly abundant megafauna. Other known primates are early Homo, the hamadryas baboon, and the extinct colobine monkey Cercopithecoides williamsi.

=== Predators ===
The left foot of a P. boisei specimen (though perhaps actually belonging to H. habilis) from Olduvai Gorge seems to have been bitten off by a crocodile, possibly Crocodylus anthropophagus, and another's leg shows evidence of leopard predation. Other likely Olduvan predators of great apes include the hunting hyena Chasmaporthetes nitidula, and the sabertoothed cats Dinofelis and Megantereon. The carnivore assemblage at the Cradle of Humankind comprises the two sabertooths, and the hyena Lycyaenops silberbergi.

Male P. robustus appear to have had a higher mortality rate than females. It is possible that males were more likely to be kicked out of a group, and these lone males had a higher risk of predation.

=== Extinction ===
It was once thought that Paranthropus had become a specialist feeder, and were inferior to the more adaptable tool-producing Homo, leading to their extinction, but this has been called into question. However, smaller brain size may have been a factor in their extinction along with gracile australopithecines. P. boisei may have died out due to an arid trend starting 1.45 mya, causing the retreat of woodlands, and more competition with savanna baboons and Homo for alternative food resources.

South African Paranthropus appear to have outlasted their East African counterparts. The youngest record of P. boisei comes from Konso, Ethiopia about 1.4 mya; however, there are no East African sites dated between 1.4 and 1 mya, so it may have persisted until 1 mya. P. robustus, on the other hand, was recorded in Swartkrans until Member 3 dated to 1–0.6 mya (the Middle Pleistocene), though more likely the younger side of the estimate.

== See also ==
- Australopithecus
- Ardipithecus
- Graecopithecus
- Orrorin
- Sahelanthropus
