= Post-orbital constriction =

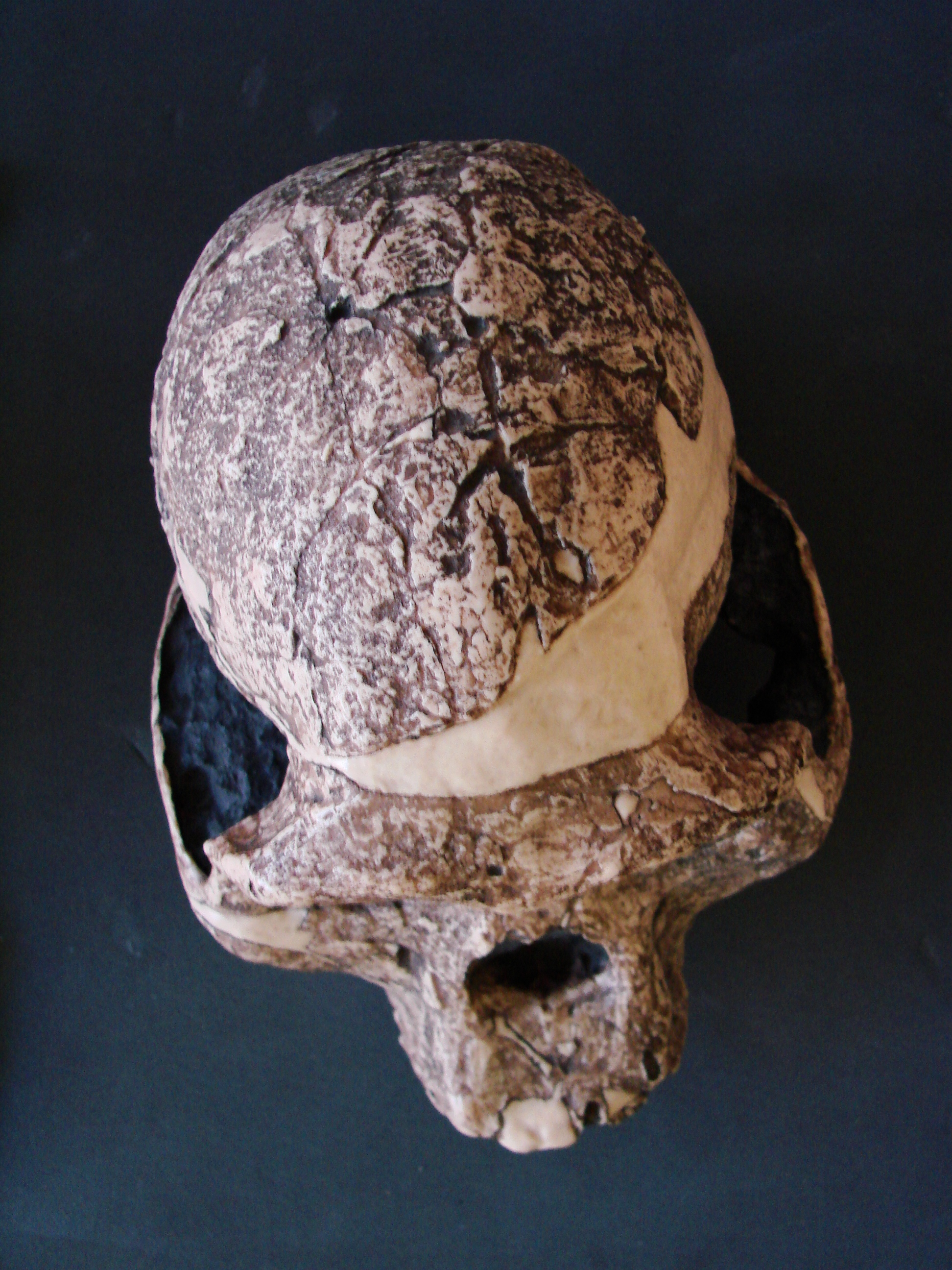
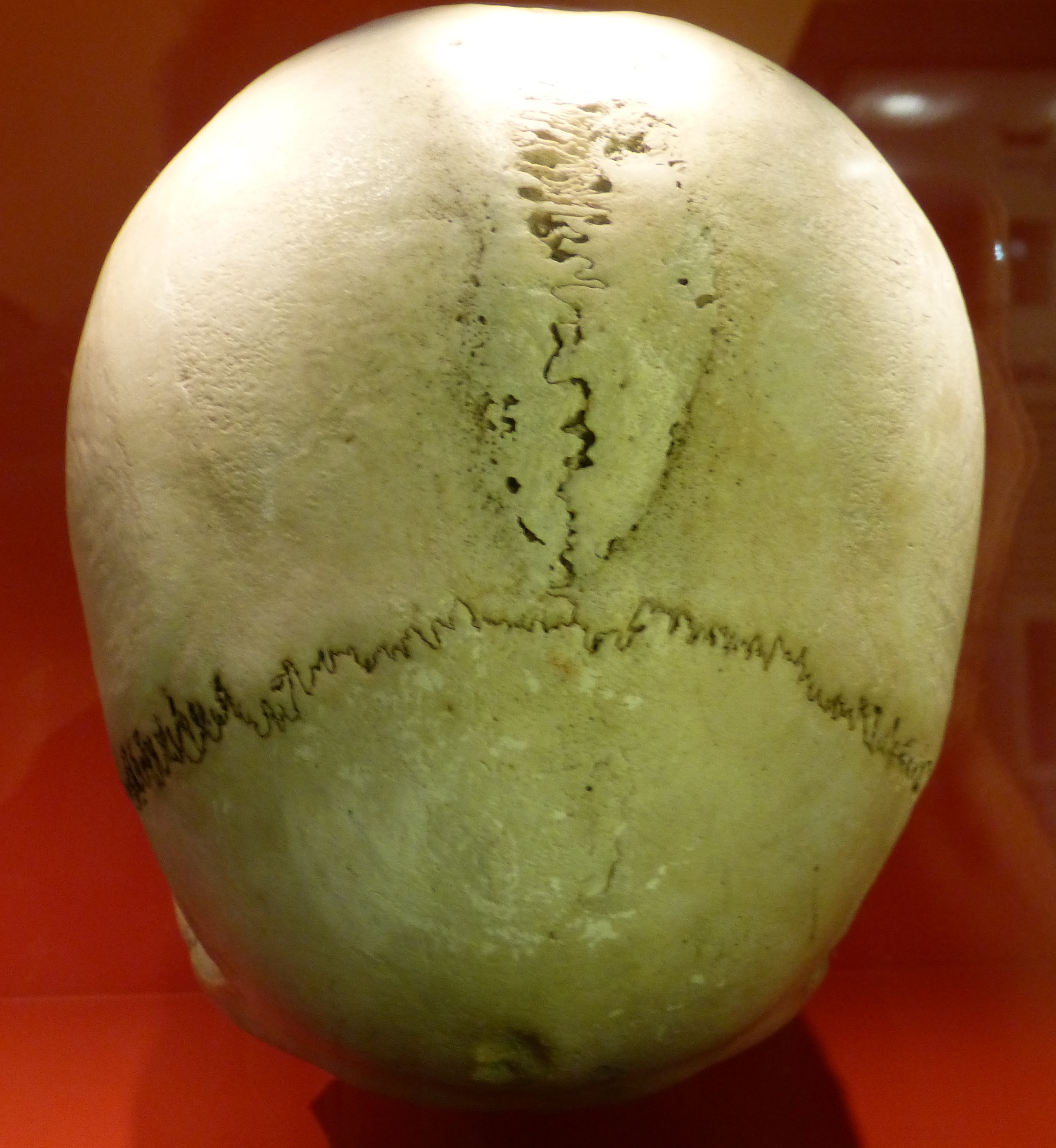
Top view of Australopithecus africanus skull with post-orbital constriction (left) and modern human skull without (right)

Post-orbital constriction is the narrowing of the cranium (skull) just behind the orbits (eye sockets) found in most non-human primates and early hominins. This constriction is very noticeable in non-human primates, slightly less so in australopithecines, further less so in Homo erectus and absent in modern Homo sapiens. Post-orbital constriction index in non-human primates and hominin range in category from increased constriction, intermediate, reduced constriction and disappearance. The post-orbital constriction index is defined by either a ratio of minimum frontal breadth (MFB), behind the supraorbital torus, divided by the maximum upper facial breadth (BFM), bifrontomalare temporale, or as the maximum width behind the orbit of the skull.

== Cranial evolution ==
Post-orbital constriction for various hominids
Increased constriction
| Gorilla | 0.57 |
| Paranthropus aethiopicus (KNM WT 17000) | 0.57 |
| Paranthropus boisei (KNM-ER 406) | 0.57 |
Intermediate
| Dryopithecus (RUD 77) | 0.73 |
| Sahelanthropus (TM 266-01-060-1) | 0.59 |
| Australopithecus | 0.66 |
| Paranthropus robustus | 0.70 |
| Homo habilis (OH 24, KNM-ER 1813) | 0.72 |
| Homo rudolfensis | 0.70 |
| Homo ergaster | 0.75 |
| Orangutan | 0.66 |
| Chimpanzee | 0.70 |
Reduced constriction
| Praeanthropus | 0.80 |
Absolutely reduced constriction
| Homo sapiens | 0.92 |

Measurement of cranial capacity in hominis has been long used to examine the evolutionary development of increased brain size, allowing for comparing and contrasting among hominin skulls and between primates and hominins. Similarly, the post-orbital constriction index has become a form to compare and contrast craniums with the possibility of determining the relative age and evolutionary place of a new found hominin. Cranial capacity and post-orbital constriction index can demonstrate a correlation between increased brain size and reduced post-orbital constriction. For example, the average cranial capacity for Australopithecines is 440 cc, and the post-orbital constriction index is 0.66. However, with the evolutionary change in brain size in Australopithecines to the Homo genus, the average cranial capacity for Homo Habilis is 640 cc, and the post-orbital constriction index is 0.72. More specifically, in a departure from Homo erectus, Homo sapiens manifests an absolutely reduced post-orbital constriction (post-orbital constriction disappears) and a post-orbital constriction index of 0.92 due to increase in cranial capacity, about 1,350 cc. From the Australopithecines to the Homo genus, along with an increase in cranial capacity, a transition from intermediate constriction to reduced constriction is visible, and eventually disappearance. Brain growth has changed both the appearance of the sagittal crest and post-orbital constriction. KNM-ER 406, the skull of a Paranthropus, brain volume estimated to 410 cm^{3} with a visible sagittal crest and mild or intermediate post-orbital constriction but KNM-ER 37333, the skull of a Homo erectus, brain volume of 850 cm^{3} with no visual sagittal crest and an almost not present or reduced post-orbital constriction.

== Minatogawa I and IV and Dali ==
Minatogawa I-IV cranium were discovered in Okinawa Island in 1970–1971. The skulls and other fossils found associated were dated to be 15,000-20,000 years old, with a chance of being slightly older. In a study led by Daisuke Kubo, Reiko T. Kono, and Gen Suwa, the craniums for Minatogawa I and IV were further examined to identify cranial capacity and concluded that Minatogawa I's estimated cranial size is 1335 cc and Minatogawa IV's is 1170 cc, very close to the average cranial size of modern Homo sapiens. Kubo, et al. identify two possible forms of measuring post-orbital constriction, established by measuring the anterior, closer to the face, and posterior of the cranium. Researchers conclude that both crania demonstrate a marked or almost reduced post-orbital constriction in both measurements of post-orbital constriction, compared to modern Homo sapiens.

The Dali cranium was discovered in 1978 in Dali County, Shaanxi. The cranium is described to be large with some robust features similar to early Western Homo sapiens and noticeable differentiation from the cranium of Homo erectus found in Zhoukoudian. The Dali cranium was found to exhibit a pronounced or almost reduced post-orbital constriction with a post-orbital constriction index of 0.85, much stronger than primates and early hominin and falling fairly close to the post-orbital constriction index of Homo sapiens. The Dali cranium is an example of the evolutionary development of post-orbital constriction as brain size enlarges and develops similar features found in modern Homo sapiens.

== Temporalis muscle ==
In species such as baboons and African great apes, an increase in the available capacity of the infratemporal fossa is simultaneously accompanied by a constriction in the sagittal plane. As such, the anterior and posterior portions of the anterior temporalis muscle are inversely correlated in size, with the anterior being larger. Although the temporalis muscle is used for chewing, there is no evidence that the supraorbital structure of primates is dependent upon their respective chewing habits or dietary preferences.

== See also ==
- Alveolar prognathism
- Craniometry
