= Paranthropus capensis =

Paranthropus capensis Temporal range: 1.4 Ma Early Pleistocene

Scientific classification
- Kingdom: Animalia
- Phylum: Chordata
- Class: Mammalia
- Order: Primates
- Superfamily: Hominoidea
- Family: Hominidae
- Genus: †Paranthropus
- Species: †P. capensis

Binomial name
- †Paranthropus capensis (Broom & Robinson, 1949)

Species of extinct primate

Paranthropus capensis (originally Telanthropus capensis) is an extinct hominin. The species represents a distinct, more gracile (slender) member of the Paranthropus genus, separate from the three widely recognized species (P. aethiopicus, P. boisei, and P. robustus).
