= Postcanine megadontia =

Relative enlargement of pre-molars and molars compared with other teeth

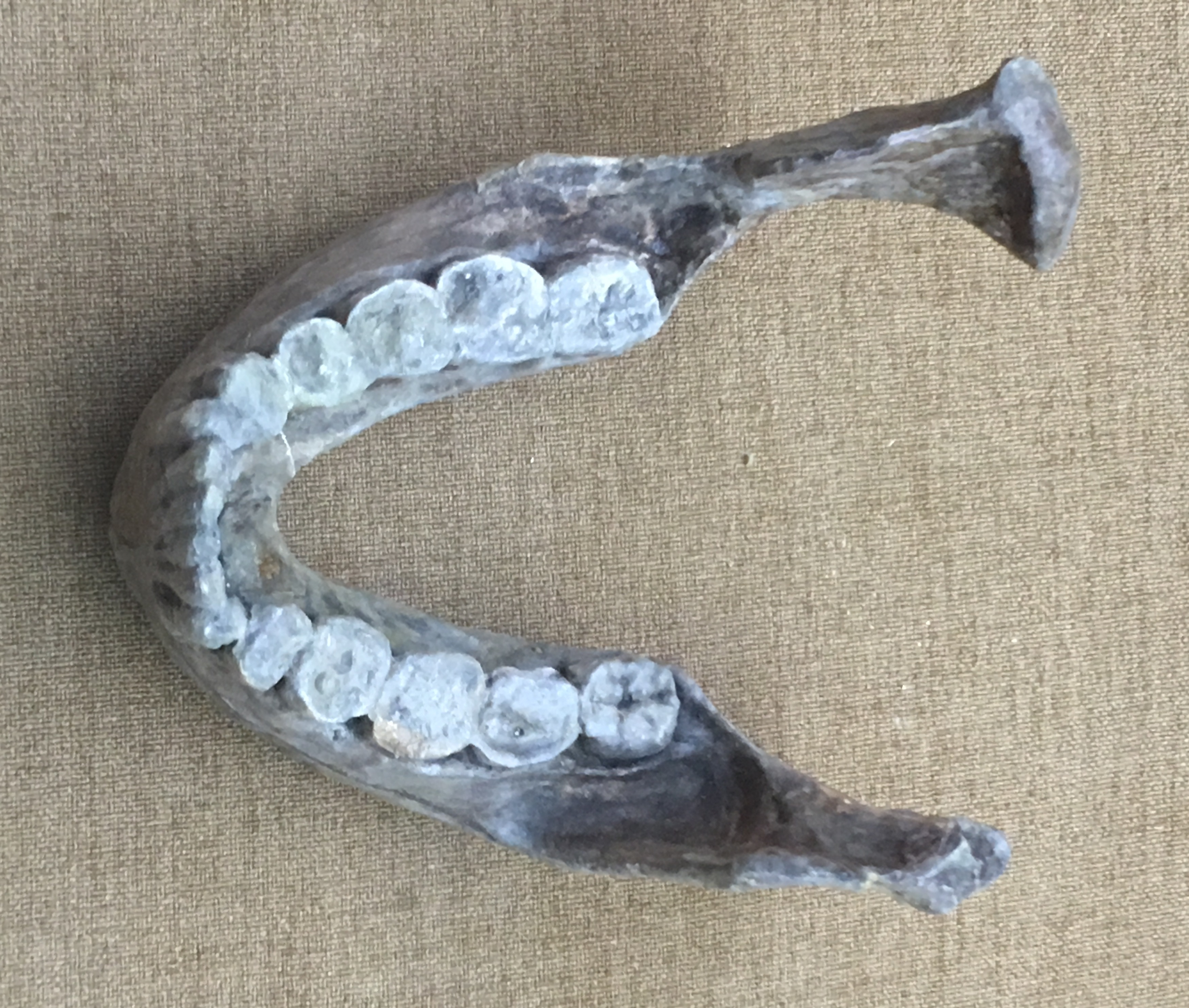
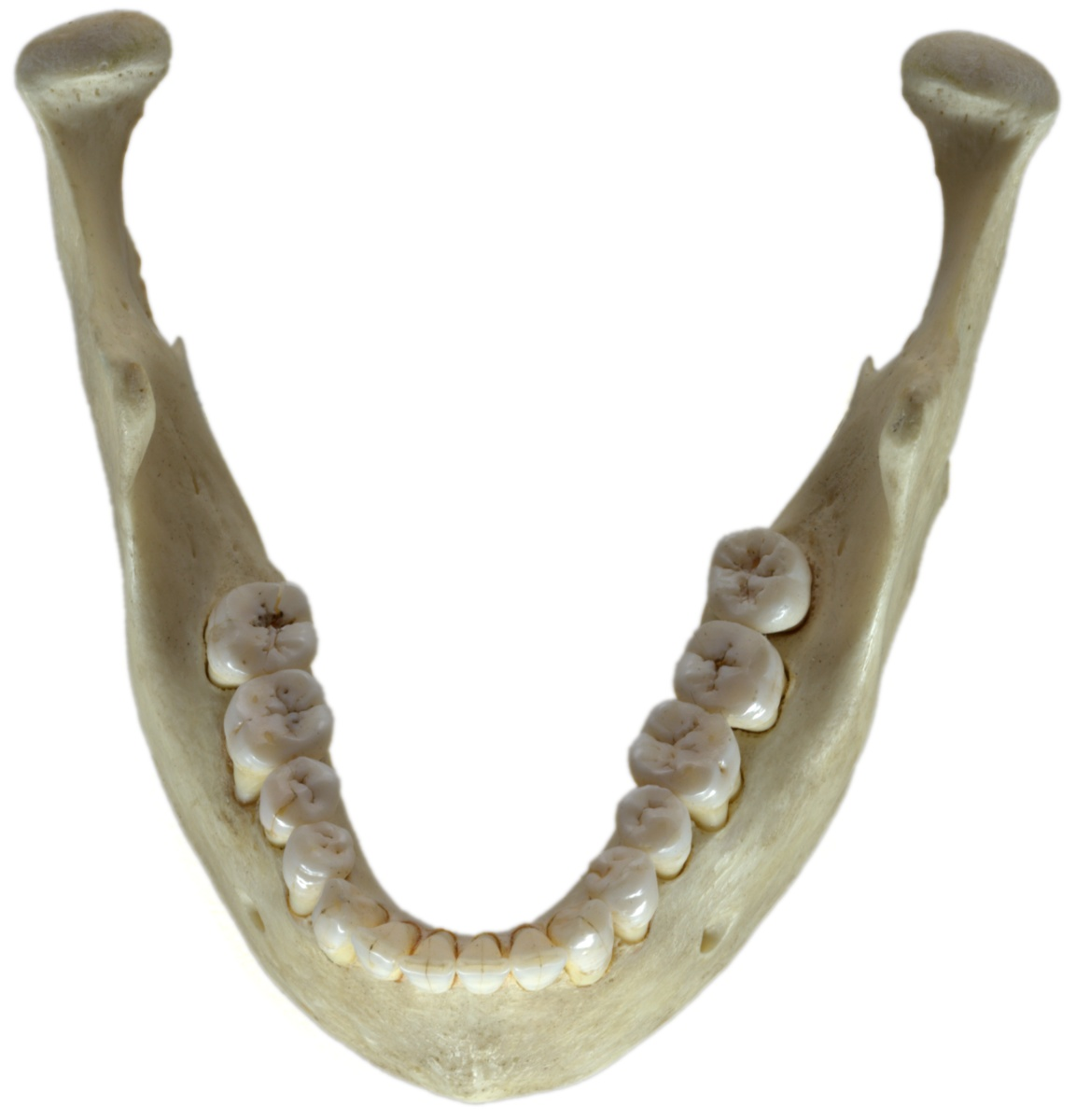
Jaw of Paranthropus boisei (left) vs that of a modern human (right)

Post-canine megadontia is a relative enlargement of the molars and premolars compared to the size of the incisors and canines. This phenomenon is seen in some early hominid ancestors such as Paranthropus aethiopicus.

== Archaeological evidence ==
The evidence for postcanine megadontia comes from measuring postcanine tooth surface area of hominid specimens and comparing these measurements to other hominid species. Australopithecus, dated to have lived 2 to 3 million years ago, is the earliest hominid genus to demonstrate postcanine enlargement, with average postcanine tooth area ranging from approximately 460mm^{2} and going all the way up to the largest tooth area, 756mm^{2}, which is seen in Paranthropus boisei . After Australopithecus, a trend of steady decline in postcanine size is observed, starting in the genus Homo and culminating with Homo sapiens which has an average postcanine tooth area of only 334mm^{2}.

Studies of premolar size in hominid species that predate Australopithecus afarensis show long, uni-cuspid teeth at the P_{3} location, while species dated after A. afarensis have been shown to have wider, bicuspid teeth at the same location, which is hypothesized to show the beginnings of canine to premolar evolution in hominids.

Homo floresiensis, a hominid species from the late Pleistocene found in cave deposits in Liang Bua, Indonesia, shows a smaller molar size that is closer to the hominid lineage. However, the remaining teeth of H. floresiensis show similarities to the bigger tooth sizes of the earlier genera Australopithecus and Homo.

== Timeline and map ==
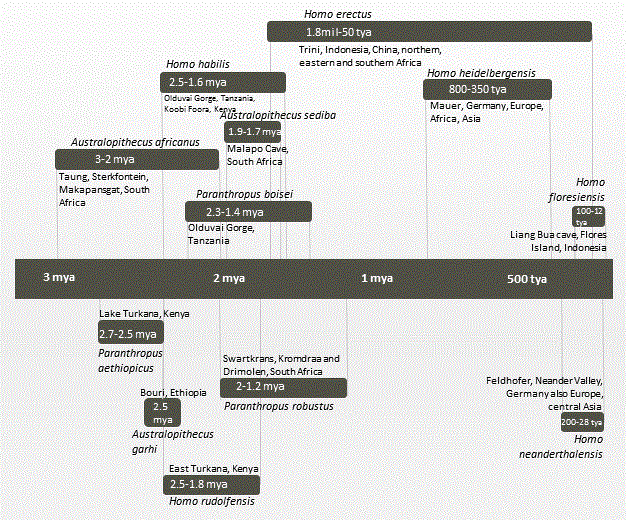
A timeline depicting observed evidence of postcanine megadontia

The shift towards postcanine megadontia dates back to about 4-5 million years ago with the discovery of Ardipithecus ramidus in the Middle Awash region of Ethiopia. Distinctive features in A. ramidus such as dentition with reduced canines, the skull, hindlimb and forelimb suggest it to be near the split between the chimpanzee and hominin lineages.

It was the origin of Australopithecus africanus, found in several regions of South Africa (Taung, Sterkfontein, Makapansgat) 2-3 million years ago that first demonstrated the enlargement of the pre-molars and molars. In terms of morphology, A. africanus shares many similar characteristics with A. afarensis as well as other genera in Paranthropus.

The first specimen of Paranthropus aethiopicus was discovered in Lake Turkana, Kenya and its successor, Paranthropus robustus, was found in the northern parts of South Africa (Swartkrans, Kromdraai and Drimolen). Paranthropus boisei, the last species included in the genus Paranthropus, was first found in Olduvai Gorge, Tanzania and around Ethiopia and Kenya. P. boisei was known for massive facial and dental bones and structure, primarily larger mandibles, molars, and premolars, which was an adaptation allowing them to consume hard plant foods with the ability of high force chewing.

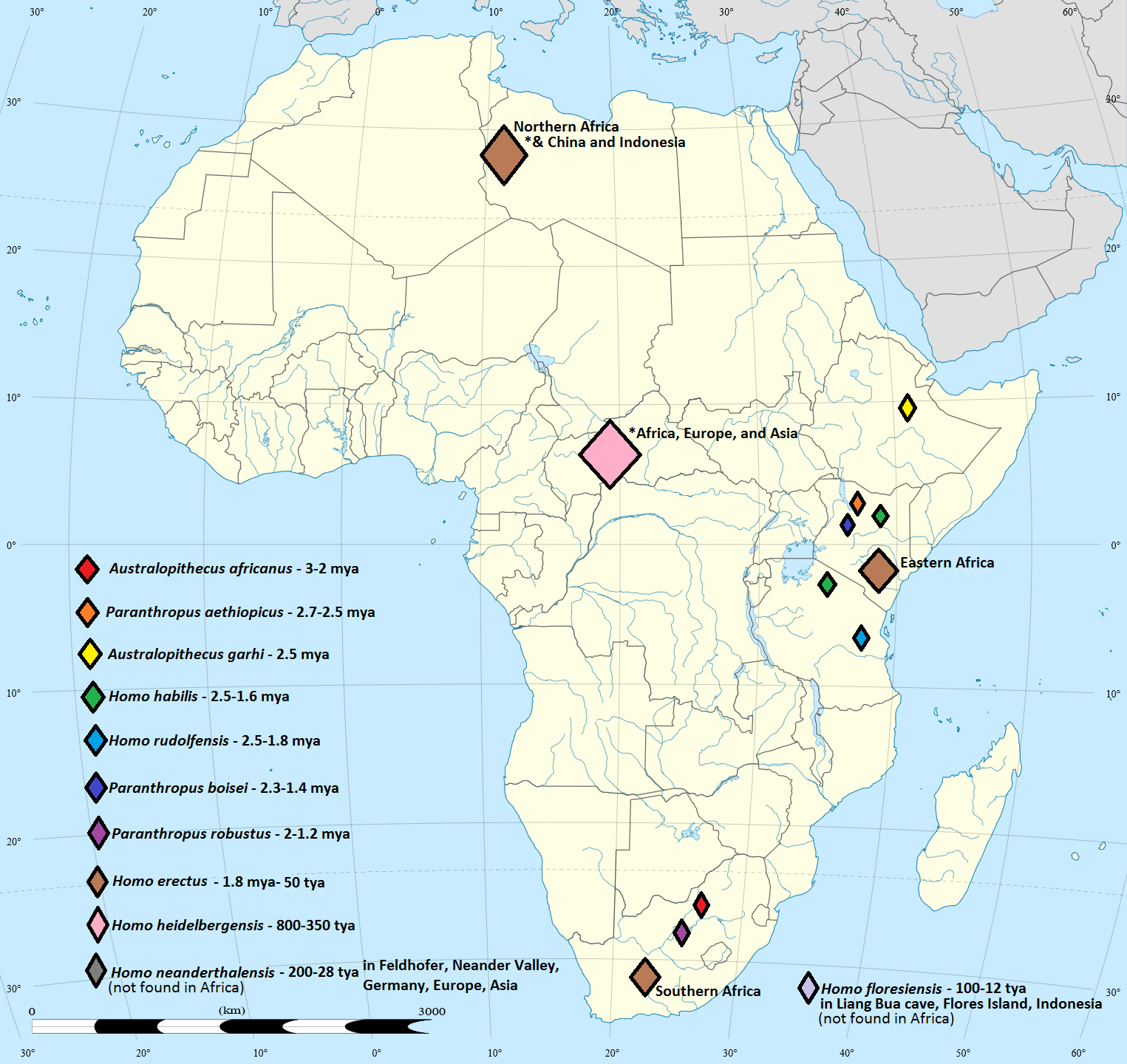
A map depicting the locations of species with postcanine megadontia in Africa

The first species in the genus Homo, Homo habilis, has been found in Tanzania and Kenya at sites dating between 2.1 and 1.5 million years ago. Species within the genus Homo showed no difference within molar size up until Homo floresiensis, where smaller molars were beginning to be expressed. Species after H. floresiensis such as H. heidelbergensis, H. neanderthalensis, and H. sapiens began to show instead wider frontal teeth and a decrease in size of the molars compared to earlier species. H. sapiens shows significantly smaller molars, mandible, and a prominence of the chin.

== Evolutionary implications ==
Postcanine megadontia is commonly associated with the repeated consumption of tough plant-like material, which can be referred to as "low-quality food stuffs". The substances were integral to the diet of extinct hominids, and their molars were subject to the constant occlusal attrition from the stress of vigorous mastication. The development and evolution of this trait was characterized by a thick coating of enamel surrounding the molars and premolars, mitigating the detrimental effects of the tough diet. As such, this postcanine dentition is capable of "crushing and grinding" the tough shoots and leaves common to the diet of an early hominid. Australopithecus Paranthropus, for example, was perhaps the most noteworthy hominid to display this trait, an adaptation perhaps due to its varied and encompassing diet . Note, postcanine megadontia is hypothesized to have no correlation to durophagy, but is rather a crucial development in hominids that allowed for preservation of occlusal quality.

Increased postcanine size can be correlated with the evolution of other physiological traits Inverse trends of brain mass and molar size point to diet and food processing as a linking factor; encephalization is a crucial consideration in the development of tool usage and extraoral food processing that was observed in Homo species, but not in Australopithecines. Post canine enlargement has also been significantly positively correlated with basal metabolic rate, independently of body size. Larger primates tend to need larger teeth to process more food to meet the energy requirements of a larger body, but the evolution of postcanine megadontia is more likely due to the quality of the diet. The tough, "low-quality food stuffs" consumed by robust Australopithecines, coupled with their lack of food processing technology, lead to an enlargement of the occlusal surface of the molars.

A study that analyzed the development of molars in hominids and Miocene apes found that a larger "ratio of the areas of [molar 1] and [molar 3]" could correlate to an increase in fruits found in the diet of these species. An increased ratio of the areas of molars was found to have a negative correlation with the amount of "leaves, flowers, and shoots" in the diet, suggesting that species like Ardipithecus, which had a greater ratio of areas of molars, had gradually transitioned to including more fruit in their diet as the size of their molars increased. Many modern primates who lack such dietary features have been shown to occasionally rely on "fall-back foods" of these sorts, implying robust Australopithecines developed postcanine megadontia as they had to more heavily rely on such foods.

== Form and function ==
=== Form ===
While postcanine megadontia denotes the enlargement of the premolars and molars found in early hominid ancestors, it did not affect the structural organization of the cusps that make up those teeth, and thus, were used similarly to the premolars and molars that modern humans possess today. The premolars and molars of modern hominids and those affected by postcanine megadontia both have two and between four and five cusps respectively. The enlargement of the teeth affected by postcanine megadontia, without a difference in the arrangement or number of cusps that compose them, imparted an increased ability for grinding and crushing matter compared to modern day humans. While the form of the teeth themselves is not affected by postcanine megadontia, the ratio of molar teeth volume to total teeth volume is dramatically larger in specimens with postcanine megadontia compared to their modern human counterparts, an adaptation that shows signs of evolutionary convergence when compared to the form and function of the teeth found in many modern herbivores.

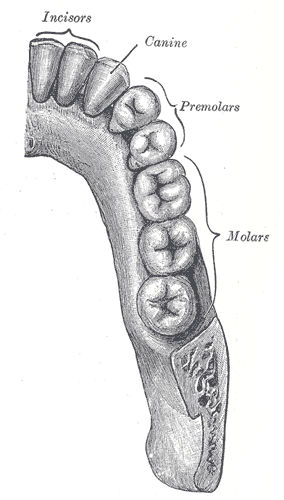
Location and form of modern human teeth.

=== Functionality ===
Postcanine megadontia is associated with specific food material properties. This allows for great insight into the diets of early hominins that exhibited the trait. Post-canine megadontia is most commonly linked to diets rich in foods that are "small, chemically sealed, and resistant to bolus formation." Having these larger teeth in comparison to the oral cavity size breaks down food particles more, which will increase the effectiveness of the natural processes of food processing that occur within the mouth. For example, the large transverse dimensions of corpses of Homo floresiensis from the Liang Bua cave on Flores Island in Indonesia suggest that these early hominids had postcanine megadontia and a diet with great masticatory stress. However, as Homo evolved, the amount of masticatory stress involved in eating decreased as "behavioral adaptations for extraoral food processing" were further developed. Thus, tool making Liang Bua corpses would have a comparatively smaller transverse dimensions of the skull, meaning their "mascilatory functional morphology" deviates greatly from the Pleistocene Homo.'

Skull of a Homo floresiensis next to a modern human skull

=== Biomechanics ===
Megadontia works by increasing the ratio of minimum to maximum second moments of area or the efficiency of a shape to resist bending or malformation. This resistance is tied to whichever specific axis about which the bending is being applied. Also called mandible robusticity, this characteristic allows for much stronger mastication of food. However, calculations made using biomechanical models does not necessarily perfectly predict the efficiency of different mandibular compositions in resistance to bending forces. Shearing is also an important factor in mastication effectiveness, and resistance to shear is proportional to the cross sectional area of the teeth. In postcanine Megadontia specimens, the cross sectional area is on average much larger than modern hominids which implies greater shear stress resistance.

=== Genetics ===
Some important genes involved in the development and regulation of tooth formation include BMP4, FGF8, and homeobox genes such as MSX1, PAX9, PITX2, SHOX2, Barx1, and Shh to name a few. Research suggests that homeobox genes are mainly responsible for much of the variance in tooth morphogenesis observed in fossilized hominids. It is theorized that tooth enlargement is due to several different gene mechanisms, none of them fully understood, and that selection acts on molars and pre-molars as a singular unit rather than on individual teeth.

There are a few theories concerning the selection mechanisms. One theory is that selection acts on the variation in the molars and pre-molars presented by the homeobox genes in hominid species. Another theory suggests that postcanine megadontia resulted from the spatial reassignment by homeobox genes that increased postcanine tooth size while simultaneously decreasing the size of the canines.

For the transition from megadontia to normal-sized postcanine teeth and its inverse relationship to brain size, one hypothesis proposes that an inactivation of the MYH16 gene, which resulted in an increase in brain size, decreased temporal muscle mass. The decrease in muscle allowed for the brain to grow, which might have allowed early hominids to develop tools. A second hypothesis suggests that the SRGAP2 gene is responsible instead. The inhibition of this gene allows for an increase in brain development.

== Comparative biology ==
=== Compared with modern human dental morphology ===
Compared to present day humans, early hominids such as Paranthropus aethiopicus and Australopithecus garhi had significantly larger dental morphology in their molars and premolars and smaller incisors. The hominids possessing postcanine megadontia had thick molar enamel, premolars with molarized roots, and lower molars that had additional capsules. Rather than inheriting their early hominid ancestors' large sized molars, human molars evolved significantly, reducing instead to a size more similar to their front teeth. Contrary to megadont hominins' dominant second molars, modern humans' first molar is the largest, and their mandibles can rarely fit a third molar.

=== Compared to primates and other species ===
The morphology of teeth among species offers insight into their diet and phylogeny. The constant chewing in primate's diets created a selection in primate molar shape, notably possessing cusp tips to ingest seeds. In order to achieve maximum chewing efficiency as the food toughness increases, folivorous primates tend to have larger postcanines than frugivorous primates. In primates, positive allometry exists between the size of postcanine teeth in primates and cranial length. This relationship has also been suggested in other groups of mammals, but the differences in postcanine size in primates are less variant compared to other mammals. Other species with herbivorous diets have adaptations in their postcanines in order to eat plant material, but the term postcanine megadontia typically refers to the dental adaptation in the hominid group.
