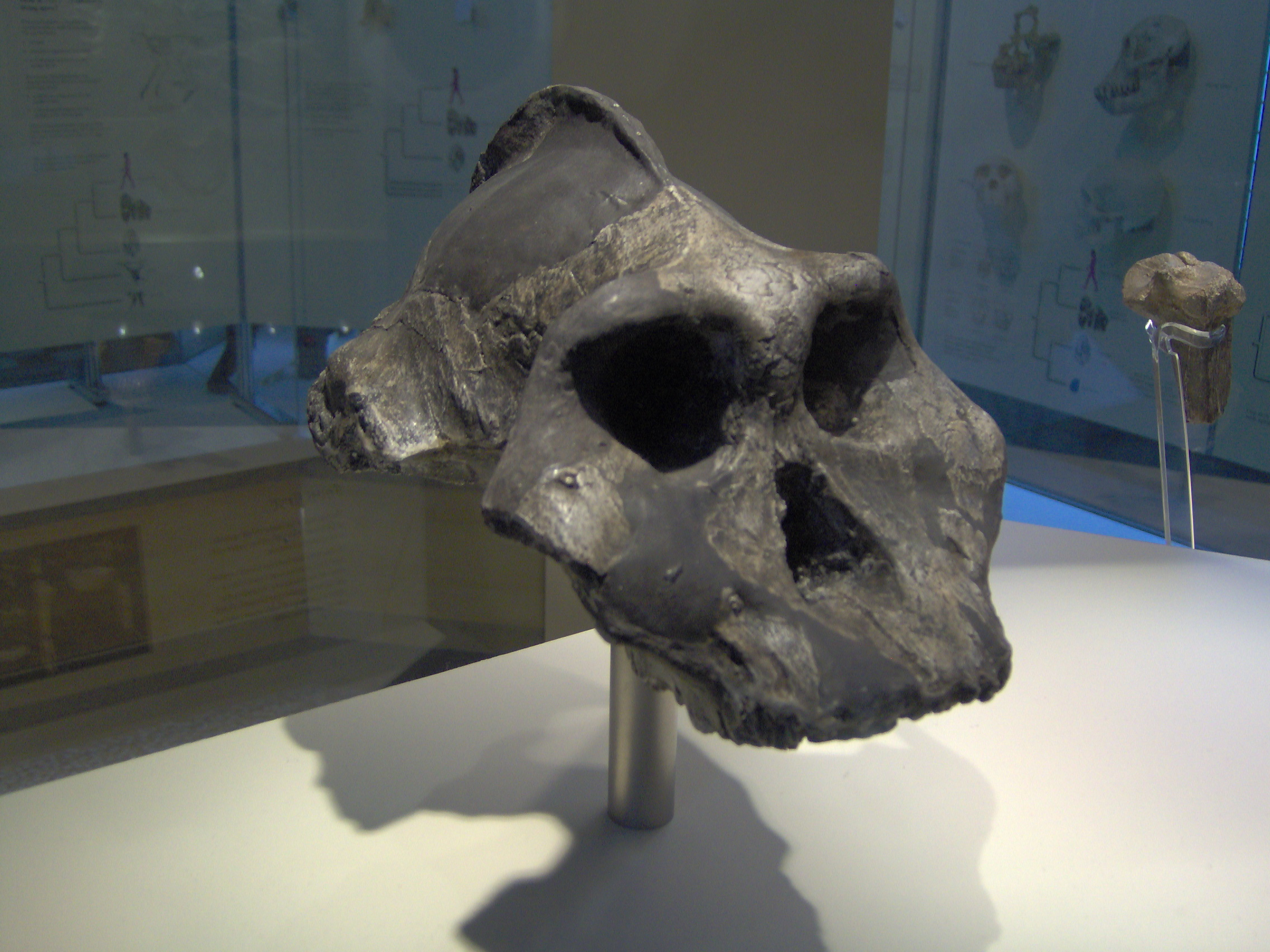
- Reconstruction of KNM WT 17000

Scientific classification
- Kingdom: Animalia
- Phylum: Chordata
- Class: Mammalia
- Order: Primates
- Superfamily: Hominoidea
- Family: Hominidae
- Genus: †Paranthropus
- Species: †P. aethiopicus

Binomial name
- †Paranthropus aethiopicus Arambourg and Coppens, 1968

Synonyms
- Paraustralopithecus aethiopicus Arambourg and Coppens, 1968; Australopithecus aethiopicus Walker and Leakey, 1985 (preoccupied); Australopithecus walkeri Ferguson, 1989

= Paranthropus aethiopicus =

Paranthropus aethiopicus Temporal range: Pliocene-Pleistocene, 2.7–2.3 Ma

Extinct species of hominin of East Africa

Paranthropus aethiopicus is an extinct species of robust australopithecine from the Late Pliocene to Early Pleistocene of East Africa about 2.7–2.3 million years ago. However, it is much debated whether or not Paranthropus is an invalid grouping and is synonymous with Australopithecus, so the species is also often classified as Australopithecus aethiopicus. (Note: or Australopithecus walkeri as the former combination is preoccupied by a junior synonym of Australopithecus afarensis) Whatever the case, it is considered to have been the ancestor of the much more robust P. boisei. It is debated if P. aethiopicus should be subsumed under P. boisei, and the terms P. boisei sensu lato ("in the broad sense") and P. boisei sensu stricto ("in the strict sense") can be used to respectively include and exclude P. aethiopicus from P. boisei.

Like other Paranthropus, P. aethiopicus had a tall face, thick palate, and especially enlarged cheek teeth. However, likely due to its archaicness, it also diverges from other Paranthropus, with some aspects resembling the much earlier A. afarensis. P. aethiopicus is known primarily by the skull KNM WT 17000 from West Turkana, Kenya, as well as some jawbones from Koobi Fora; the Shungura Formation, Ethiopia; and Laetoli, Tanzania. These locations featured bushland to open woodland landscapes with edaphic (water-logged) grasslands.

== Taxonomy ==
=== Research history ===
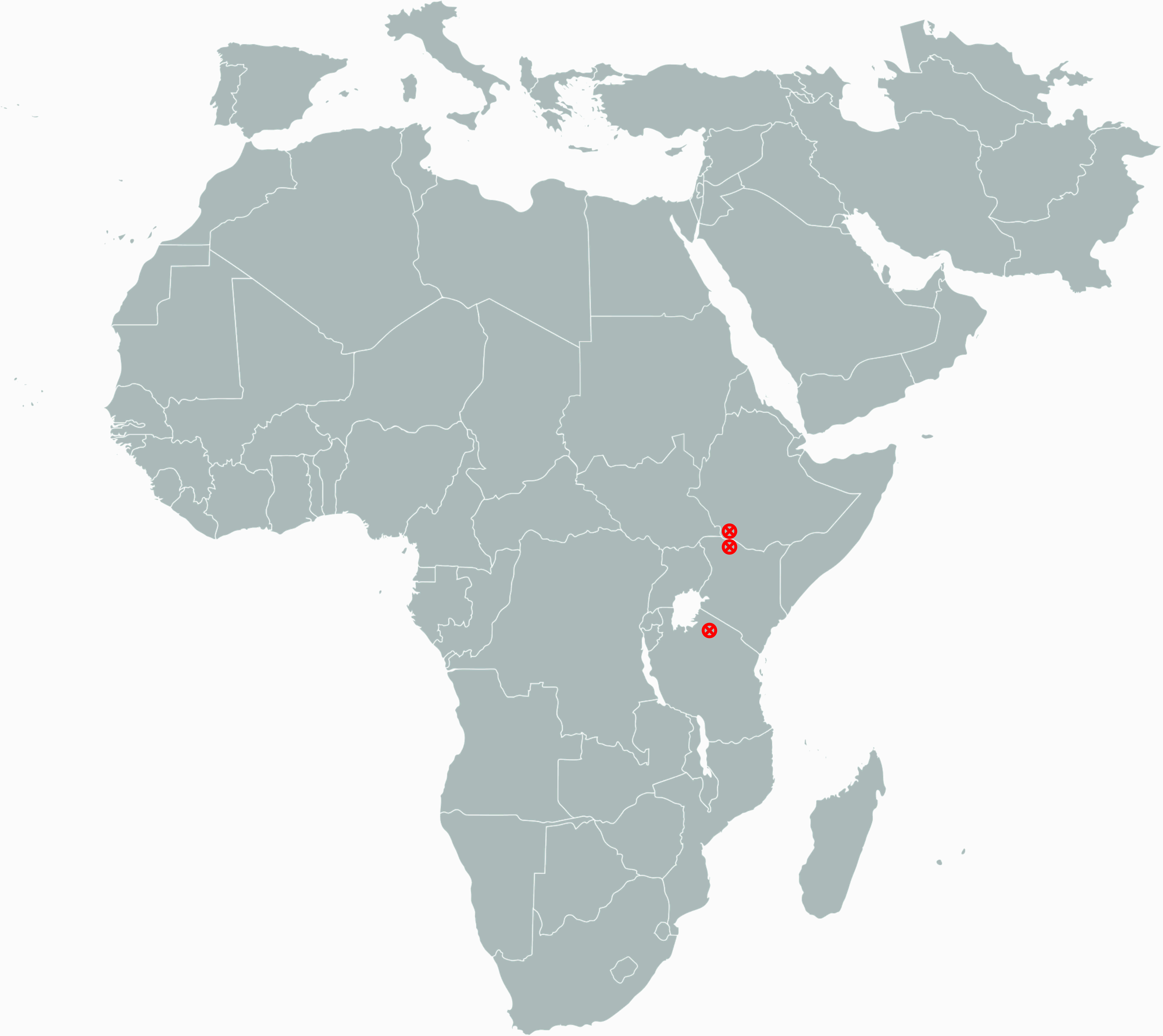
Locations of P. aethiopicus discoveries

In 1968, French palaeontologist Camille Arambourg and Breton anthropologist Yves Coppens described "Paraustralopithecus aethiopicus" based on a toothless mandible (Omo 18) from the Shungura Formation, Ethiopia. The name aethiopicus refers to Ethiopia. In 1976, American anthropologist Francis Clark Howell and Coppens reclassified it as A. africanus.

In 1985, the skull KNM WT 17000 dating to 2.5 million years ago was reported from Koobi Fora, Lake Turkana, Kenya, by anthropologists Alan Walker and Richard Leakey. A partial jawbone from a different individual, KNM-WT 16005, was also discovered. They clearly belonged to a robust australopithecine. By this time, much younger robust australopithecines had been reported from South Africa (robustus) and East Africa (boisei), and been variously assigned to either Australopithecus or a unique genus Paranthropus. Walker and Leakey assigned KNM WT 17000 to the boisei clade. They noted several anatomical differences, but were unsure if this stemmed from the specimens' archaicness or represented the normal range of variation for the species. If the former, they recommended classifying them and similar specimens into a different species, aethiopicus (and recommended that Paraustralopithecus be invalid). The discovery of these archaic specimens overturned previous postulations that P. robustus was the ancestor of the much more robust P. boisei (a hypothesis notably argued by palaeoanthropologist Yoel Rak in 1985) by establishing the boisei lineage as beginning long before robustus had existed.

In 1989, palaeoartist Walter Ferguson recommended KNM WT 17000 be classified into a different species, walkeri, because the holotype of aethiopicus comprised only the jawbone and KNM WT 17000 preserves no jaw elements. Ferguson's classification is almost universally ignored, and is considered to be synonymous with P. aethiopicus.

Several more lower and upper jaw specimens have been unearthed in the Shungura Formation, including a juvenile specimen, L338y-6. In 2002, a 2.7–2.5 Ma maxilla, EP 1500, from Laetoli, Tanzania, was assigned to P. aethiopicus. Also found was the upper portion of a tibia, but it cannot definitively be associated with EP 1500 and thus with P. aethiopicus.

=== Classification ===
The genus Paranthropus (from Ancient Greek παρα para beside or alongside, and άνθρωπος ánthropos man, otherwise known as "robust australopithecines") typically includes P. aethiopicus, P. boisei, and P. robustus. P. aethiopicus is the earliest member of the genus, with the oldest remains, from the Ethiopian Omo Kibish Formation, dated to 2.6 million years ago (mya) at the end of the Pliocene. It is possible that P. aethiopicus evolved even earlier, up to 3.3 mya, on the expansive Kenyan floodplains of the time. P. aethiopicus is only confidently identified from the skull KNM WT 17000 and a few jaws and isolated teeth, and is generally considered to have been ancestral to P. boisei, which also inhabited East Africa, making it a chronospecies. Because of this relationship, it is debatable if P. aethiopicus should be subsumed under P. boisei or if the differences stemming from archaicness should justify species distinction. The terms P. boisei sensu lato ("in the broad sense") and P. boisei sensu stricto ("in the strict sense") can be used to respectively include and exclude P. aethiopicus from P. boisei when discussing the lineage as a whole.

It is also debated if Paranthropus is a valid natural grouping (monophyletic) or an invalid grouping of similar-looking hominins (paraphyletic). Because skeletal elements are so limited in these species, their affinities with each other and to other australopithecines is difficult to gauge with accuracy. The jaws are the main argument for monophyly, but such anatomy is strongly influenced by diet and environment, and could in all likelihood have evolved independently in P. boisei and P. robustus. Proponents of monophyly consider P. aethiopicus to be ancestral to the other two species, or closely related to the ancestor. Proponents of paraphyly allocate these three species to the genus Australopithecus as A. boisei, A. aethiopicus, and A. robustus. British geologist Bernard Wood and American palaeoanthropologist William Kimbel are major proponents of monophyly, and against include Walker.

Monophyly

- - A. africanus
  - - P. aethiopicus
    - - P. boisei
      - P. robustus

Paraphyly

- - - A. africanus
    - P. robustus
  - - P. aethiopicus
    - P. boisei

Monophyly

- - A. africanus
    - Homo
    - Australopithecus sediba
  - - A. garhi
    - P. aethiopicus
      - P. boisei
      - P. robustus

Three example family trees with P. robustus (note, they are not absolute)

This species, originally named Paraustralopithecus aethiopicus, cannot retain the species epithet aethiopicus if moved to genus Australopithecus because Australopithecus aethiopicus is already a junior synonym of Australopithecus afarensis. Such a classification would have to use the name Australopithecus walkeri for this species. The change of species epithet would also happen in a taxonomy that classifies all hominins as Homo.

== Description ==
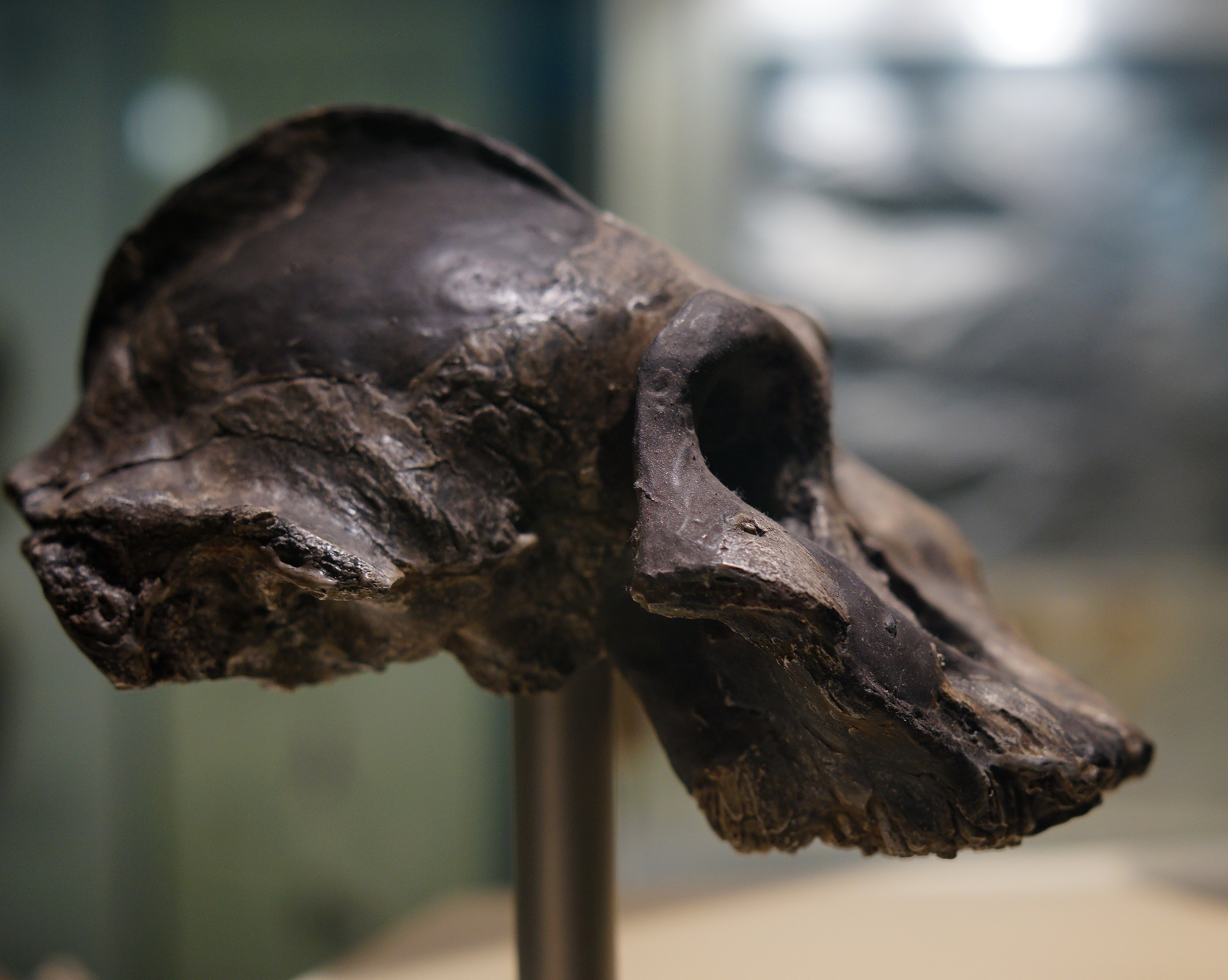
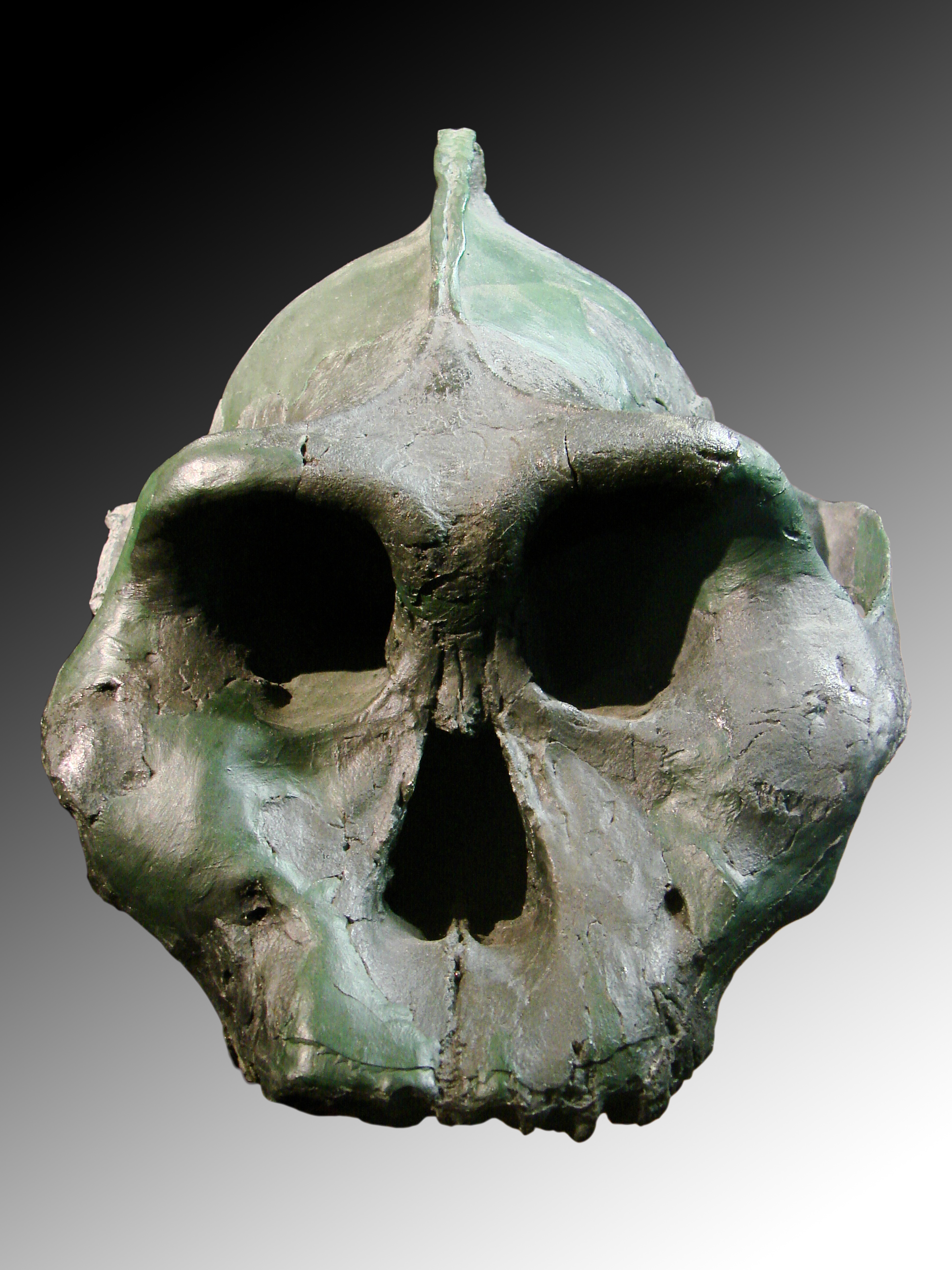
Reconstruction of KNM WT 17000, side view (left) and face (right)

Typical of Paranthropus, KNM WT 17000 is heavily built, and the palate and base of the skull are about the same size as the P. boisei holotype OH 5. The brain volume of KNM WT 17000 was estimated to have been 410 cc (25 cu in), which is smaller than that of other Paranthropus. The combination of a tall face, thick palate, and small braincase caused a highly defined sagittal crest on the midline of the skull. The only complete tooth crown of the specimen is the right third premolar, whose dimensions are well above the range of variation for P. robustus and on the upper end for P. boisei. Unlike other Paranthropus, KNM WT 17000 did not have a flat face, and the jaw jutted out (prognathism). In regard to the temporal bone, KNM WT 17000 differs from other Paranthropus in that the squamous part of temporal bone is extensively pneumaticised, the tympanic part of the temporal bone is not as vertically orientated, the base of the skull is weakly flexed, the postglenoid process is completely anterior to (in front of) the tympanic, the tympanic is somewhat tubular, and the articular tubercle is weak. Like P. boisei, the foramen magnum where the skull connects to the spine is heart-shaped. The temporalis muscle was probably not directed as forward as it was in P. boisei, meaning the P. aethiopicus jaw likely processed food with the incisors before using the cheek teeth. The incisors of P. boisei are thought to have not been involved in processing food. The long distance between the first molar and the jaw hinge would suggest KNM WT 17000 had an exceptionally long ramus of the mandible (connecting the lower jaw to the skull), though the hinge's location indicates the ramus would not have been particularly deep (it would have been weaker). This may have produced a less effective bite compared to P. boisei.

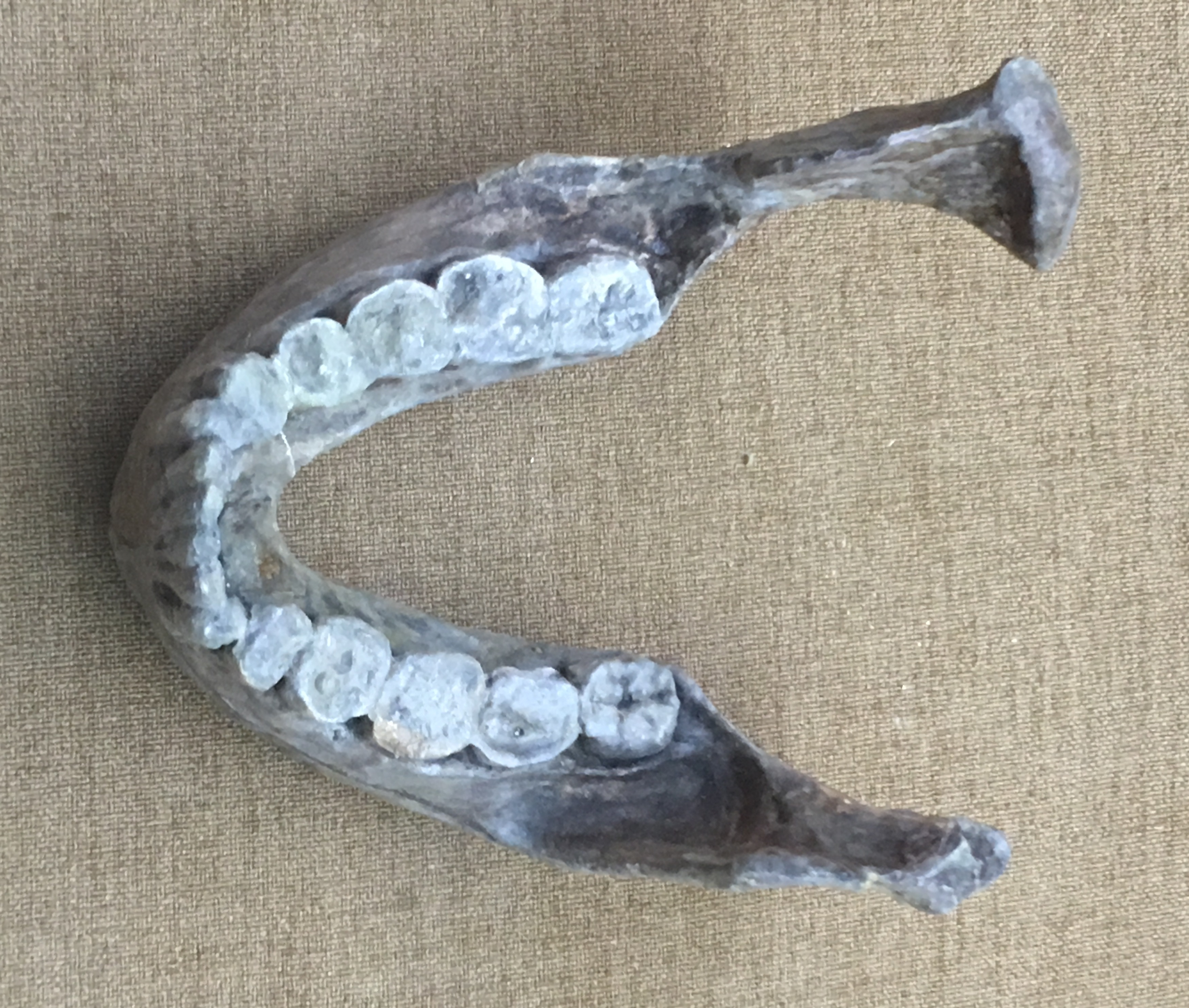
Cast of the Peninj Mandible assigned to P. boisei, which is similar to KNM-WT 16005

KNM-WT 16005 is quite similar to the Peninj Mandible assigned to P. boisei, exhibiting postcanine megadontia with relatively small incisors and canines (based on the tooth roots) and large cheek teeth. Nonetheless, the incisors were likely much broader in KNM-WT 16005. KNM-WT 16005 preserved four cheek teeth on the left side: the third premolar measuring 10.7 mm × 13.8 mm (0.42 in × 0.54 in), the fourth premolar measuring 12 mm × 15 mm (0.47 in × 0.59 in), the first molar measuring 15.7 mm × 14.3 mm (0.62 in × 0.56 in), and the second molar measuring 17 mm × 16.7 mm (0.67 in × 0.66 in). The fourth premolar and first molar are a little smaller than those of the Peninj mandible, and the second molar a bit bigger. The KNM-WT 16005 jawbone is smaller than what KNM WT 17000 would have had.

Many of these P. aethiopicus features are shared with the early A. afarensis, further reiterating the species' archaicness.

== Palaeoecology ==
In general, Paranthropus are thought to have been generalist feeders, with the heavily built skull becoming important when chewing less desirable, lower quality foods in times of famine. Unlike P. boisei which generally is found in the context of closed, wet environments, P. aethiopicus seems to have inhabited bushland to open woodland habitats around edaphic (water-logged) grasslands. Around 2.5 million years ago, at the Pliocene/Pleistocene border, the Omo–Turkana Basin featured a mix of forests, woodlands, grasslands, and bushlands, though grasslands appear to have been expanding through the Early Pleistocene. Homo seems to have entered the region 2.5–2.4 million years ago.

== See also ==
- African archaeology – Archaeology conducted in Africa
- Australopithecus garhi – Extinct hominid from the Afar Region of Ethiopia 2.6–2.5 million years ago
- Australopithecus afarensis – Extinct hominid from the Pliocene of East Africa
- Australopithecus africanus – Extinct hominid from South Africa
- Homo habilis – Archaic human species from 2.4 to 1.65 mya
- Homo rudolfensis – Extinct hominin from the Early Pleistocene of East Africa
- LD 350-1 – Earliest known specimen of the genus Homo
- Paranthropus boisei – Extinct species of hominin of East Africa
- Paranthropus robustus – Extinct species of hominin of South Africa
