= Hominid dental morphology evolution =

Evolution of human tooth and jaw shape

Changes to the dental morphology and jaw are major elements of hominid evolution. These changes were driven by the types and processing of food eaten. The evolution of the jaw is thought to have facilitated encephalization, speech, and the formation of the uniquely human chin.

== Background ==
Today, humans possess 32 permanent teeth with a dental formula of 2.1.2.32.1.2.3. This breaks down to two pairs of incisors, one pair of canines, two pairs of premolars, and three pairs of molars on each jaw. In modern day humans, incisors are generally spatulate with a single root while canines are also single rooted but are single cusped and conical. Premolars are bicuspid while molars are multi-cuspid. The upper molars have three roots while the lower molars have two roots.

General patterns of dental morphological evolution throughout human evolution include a reduction in facial prognathism, the presence of a Y5 cusp pattern, the formation of a parabolic palate and the loss of the diastema.

Human teeth are made of dentin and are covered by enamel in the areas that are exposed. Enamel, itself, is composed of hydroxyapatite, a calcium phosphate crystal. The various types of human teeth perform different functions. Incisors are used to cut food, canines are used to tear food, and the premolars and molars are used to crush and grind food.

== History ==
=== Hominidae ===
==== Chimpanzees ====
According to the theory of evolution, humans evolved from a common ancestor of chimpanzees. Researchers hypothesize that the earliest hominid ancestor would have similar dental morphology to chimpanzees today. Thus, comparisons between chimpanzees and Homo sapiens could be used to identify major differences. Major characterizing features of Pan troglodytes dental morphology include the presence of peripherally located cusps, thin enamel, and strong facial prognathism.

=== Earliest Hominids ===
==== Sahelanthropus tchadensis ====
Sahelanthropus tchadensis is thought to be one of the earliest species belonging to the human lineage. Fossils date back to 7 million years ago. The only fossils that remain are five pieces of the jaw, teeth, and a small cranium. These skeletal pieces show dental features that include a U-shaped palate and canines smaller than those of a chimpanzee’s.

==== Orrorin tugenensis ====
The species was thought to have lived 6.1 to 5.7 million years ago. Fossil remains have provided very important information regarding dental morphology. Orrorin had smaller teeth relative to body size and the enamel was thicker. The upper canines contain a mesial groove which differs from both Australopithecus and Ardipithecus. The canines, in general, were very ape-like but were much smaller. Like modern humans, Orrorin had post-canines that were smaller and were microdont.

==== Ardipithecus ====
Dated to live around 5.6 to 4.4 million years ago. Fossils show Ardipithecus to have canine teeth that were reduced, much like later hominids. The jaw of Ardipithecus was very much prognathic. The teeth of Ardipithecus ramidus in particular showed that the species was probably an omnivore. The upper canines are less sharp than a chimpanzee’s, possibly due to them being smaller in general. The canines in chimpanzees can be particularly sharp as they are often shaped through use and wear against the lower teeth. In addition, there is less sexual dimorphism in the size of the canines, a feature that is seen in humans and is heavily contrasted to chimpanzees.

The size of these canines have been used to infer the behaviours of Ardipithecus ramidus. In great contrast to the social patterns of chimpanzees, the smaller upper canine teeth suggest that the species was not very aggressive, especially in terms of the relationship between males and other groups.

=== Archaic Hominids ===
==== Australopithecus afarensis ====
Hominid species that lived 3.9 to 2.9 million years ago. Compared to modern apes, A. afarensis and A. africanus have much smaller molars and canines, but they are still larger than those of humans’. The smaller molars have been attributed to consuming seeds. The jaws of both A. afarensis and A. africanus are very much prognathic. The lack of shearing crests in the blunt teeth have also been cited as evidence of a species that could chew buds or flowers but they were still able to consume meat.

Studies of Australopithecine diets through dental microwear showed that they were largely frugivorous but there is some archaeological evidence for meat consumption. The shift in dietary capacities gave Australopithecines the advantage survive in several different habitats.

=== Archaic megadont hominids ===
Megadont hominids, in normal, show the greatest reduction in canines, but the premolars were abnormally large.

==== Paranthropus robustus ====
Determined to have lived 2 to 1.2 million years ago. True to its name, Paranthropus robustus had a more massive jaw and teeth than Homo species. In addition, the species had thicker enamel than any hominid species from the time. There is also evidence from muscle markings on jaws that robustus would have had a diet that was based on hard, tough to chew foods in times of nutritional stress. Research does show, that in general, their diet was very broad.

==== Paranthropus boisei ====
Paranthropus boisei was a hominid species dated to have lived from 2.3 to 1.2 million years ago. The evidence from fossils shows morphological traits designed for chewing hard, tough foods and is commonly referred to as the ‘nutcracker man’. Not only do the back molars have double the area that the molars of modern humans possess, but the premolars and the first and second molars were found to be four times larger than the teeth found in humans. This has been interpreted as researchers as evidence for the hominids chewing predominantly with their back teeth. In addition, P. boisei possesses the thickest enamel of any hominid specimens found. Despite such large back teeth, the incisors and canines were smaller than other species from the time.

=== Pre-Modern Homo ===
==== Homo habilis ====
The species is dated to have lived 2.1 to 1.5 million years ago. Very little is known about the dental morphology. However, in conjunction with dental evolution, it is expected that Homo habilis would display smaller teeth than those of the hominids before them. Furthermore, there would be a reduction in facial prognathism.

==== Homo erectus ====
Hominid species for evidence of remains date from 1.9 million years ago to 70000 years ago. The dental arcade is smaller than that of australopithecine species and following the trend, prognathism was reduced within the species.

Homo erectus had smaller teeth than prior Homo species, though still larger than anatomically modern Homo sapiens. The incisors also begin to show the shovel-shaped appearance, which can be attributed to a change towards a hunter-gatherer diet. The reduction in molar size has been linked to the eating of softer foods, including cooked foods as well as more meat.

==== Homo ergaster ====
Hominid species that lived 1.8 to 1.3 million years ago. Continuing the pattern of hominid dental morphological evolution, ergaster had a less prognathic face, smaller dental arcade. The mandibular symphysis is also shown to have grown. In general, the dentition is very similar to that of Homo erectus.

==== Homo heidelbergensis ====
Hominid species dating from 600000 to 300000 years ago. Analysis of H. heidelbergensis skeletons have led researchers to find that the jaw of the species featured new traits in the form of taurodont molars, a reduced M3 molar, and a large buccal cusp in the P3 premolar. In general, when compared to humans, H. heidelbergensis shows a larger jaw and smaller teeth.

==== Homo neanderthalensis ====
Although not a direct ancestor of Homo sapiens, Neanderthals are considered to be close relatives. Living 500000 to 30000 years ago, Neanderthals were named after the valley they were discovered in. Aside from just dentition, Neanderthals were more robust in general. Through analysis of specimens, the face of Neanderthals showed more prognathism, resulting in a retromolar space posterior to the third molar. Neanderthals also possessed larger molars and canine teeth with no grooves.

=== Modern-day humans ===
==== Homo sapiens ====
The general characterizing feature of the dental morphology of humans are the lack of facial prognathism, a parabola-shaped mandible and maxilla, and molars that are the same size as the front teeth. Humans also have small crowns in relation to body mass and tend to show a reduction in cusp and root number. The reduction in the dental arcade was accompanied by molars moving posteriorly and axial inclination of the molar roots.

Evolution of the mandible has also been hypothesized to provide the necessary physiology required for speech. However, these changes are also linked to the development of obstructive sleep apnea. Furthermore, the evolution of the maxillomandibular system has been linked to encephalization. As the jaw changed and the muscles become weaker, the pressure on the cranial sutures lowered, and encephalization occurred. In addition, the overall changes in the mandible and the maxilla have led to the ability for humans to speak.

Additionally, the evolution and reduction in the jaw has left little room for the third molar, or wisdom tooth, to form. As a result, many individuals choose to remove them through surgery.

One of the defining features among Homo sapiens is the presence of a chin. A protruding chin was absent in archaic hominids, as well as Neanderthals. Research has shown conflicting views on the function of the chin. Many claim that it provides resistance to forces that cause bending of the mandible while others claim there is no outright purpose to the formation and merely emerged as a point after the shortening of the mandible.

== Summary of dental morphology evolution ==
	Pan troglodytes	Sahelanthropus tchadensis	Orrorin tugenensis	Ardipithecus	Australopithecus afarensis	Paranthropus robustus	Paranthropus boisei	Homo habilis	Homo erectus	Homo ergaster	Homo heidelbergensis	Homo neanderthalensis	Homo sapiens
Dental formula	2.1.2.32.1.2.3	2.1.2.32.1.2.3	2.1.2.32.1.2.3	2.1.2.32.1.2.3	2.1.2.32.1.2.3	2.1.2.32.1.2.3	2.1.2.32.1.2.3	2.1.2.32.1.2.3	2.1.2.32.1.2.3	2.1.2.32.1.2.3	2.1.2.32.1.2.3	2.1.2.32.1.2.3	2.1.2.32.1.2.3
Y-5 cusp pattern	Present	Present	Present	Present	Present	Present	Present	Present	Present	Present	Present	Present	Present
Cusp location	Peripheral	Central	Central	Central	Central	Central	Central	Central	Central	Central	Central	Central	Central
Enamel thickness	Thin	Intermediate	Thick	Intermediate	Thick	Very thick	Very thick	Very thick	Very thick	Very thick	Very thick	Very thick	Very thick
Facial prognathism	Very strong	Very strong	Strong	Strong	Strong	Moderate	Moderate	Moderate	Mild	Mild	Mild	Mild	Mild
Shape of palate in mandible and maxilla	U-shaped	U-shaped	U-shaped	U-shaped	U-shaped	U-shaped	U-shaped	U-shaped	U-shaped	U-shaped	U-shaped	U-shaped	Parabolic
Chin	Absent	Absent	Absent	Absent	Absent	Absent	Absent	Absent	Absent	Absent	Absent	Absent	Present
Size of canines	Very large	Large	Moderate	Mild	Mild	Mild	Mild	Mild	Mild	Mild	Mild	Mild	Mild
