= Alan Walker (anthropologist) =

British anthropologist

- Born: 23 August 1938; Leicester, England
- Died: 20 November 2017 (aged 79)
- Education: University of Cambridge, University of London
- Known for: Fossil discoveries in Kenya
- Scientific career
- Fields: Paleontology
- Thesis: Locomotor adaptations in living and extinct Madagascan lemurs

Alan Cyril Walker (23 August 1938 – 20 November 2017) was the Evan Pugh Professor of Biological Anthropology and Biology at the Pennsylvania State University and a research scientist for the National Museum of Kenya.

== Life ==
He received his B.A. from Cambridge University in 1962, and his PhD from the University of London in 1967. In 2000 he received an honorary D.Sc. from the University of Chicago.

Walker was a paleoanthropologist who worked on primate and human evolution.

Walker was a member of the team led by Richard Leakey responsible for the 1984 discovery of the skeleton of the so-called Turkana Boy, and in 1985 Walker himself discovered the Black Skull near Lake Turkana in Kenya.

== Awards ==
Walker was awarded a MacArthur Fellowship "genius grant" in 1988. In 1997 he received the Rhône-Poulenc Award from the Royal Society for The Wisdom of the Bones co-authored with Pat Shipman. During the award ceremony, Terry Pratchett, chairman of the judges, said "We were fascinated by the way the forensic net was spread out, bringing so many sciences to bear on the mystery of this million-year-old teenager." The following year he received the International Fondation Fyssen Prize in Paris.

Walker and Shipman also co-wrote The Ape in the Tree, published in 2005, describing the history of discovery and scientific investigation of the Proconsul fossils in Kenya.

He was elected as a member of the American Academy of Arts and Sciences in 1996, and as a Fellow of the Royal Society in 1999. In 2003 he was named a member of the United States National Academy of Sciences.

In 2017 he received the Charles R. Darwin Lifetime Achievement Award from the American Association of Biological Anthropologists.

== Bibliography ==
- 1996 (with his wife Pat Shipman). The Wisdom of Bones. Weidenfeld & Nicolson, London.
- 1993 (with Richard Leakey) eds. The Nariokotome Homo erectus Skeleton. Cambridge MA: Harvard University Press.
- 1997 (with Meave Leakey). Early Hominid Fossils from Africa. Scientific American 276, 6, 74–79
- 2005. The Ape in the Tree: An Intellectual and Natural History of Proconsul. The Belknap Press of Harvard UP, Cambridge, Mass.

== See also ==
- List of fossil sites (with link directory)
- List of hominina (hominid) fossils (with images)
