= KNM WT 17000 =

Kenyan fossilised adult skull of the species Paranthropus aethiopicus

KNM-WT 17000
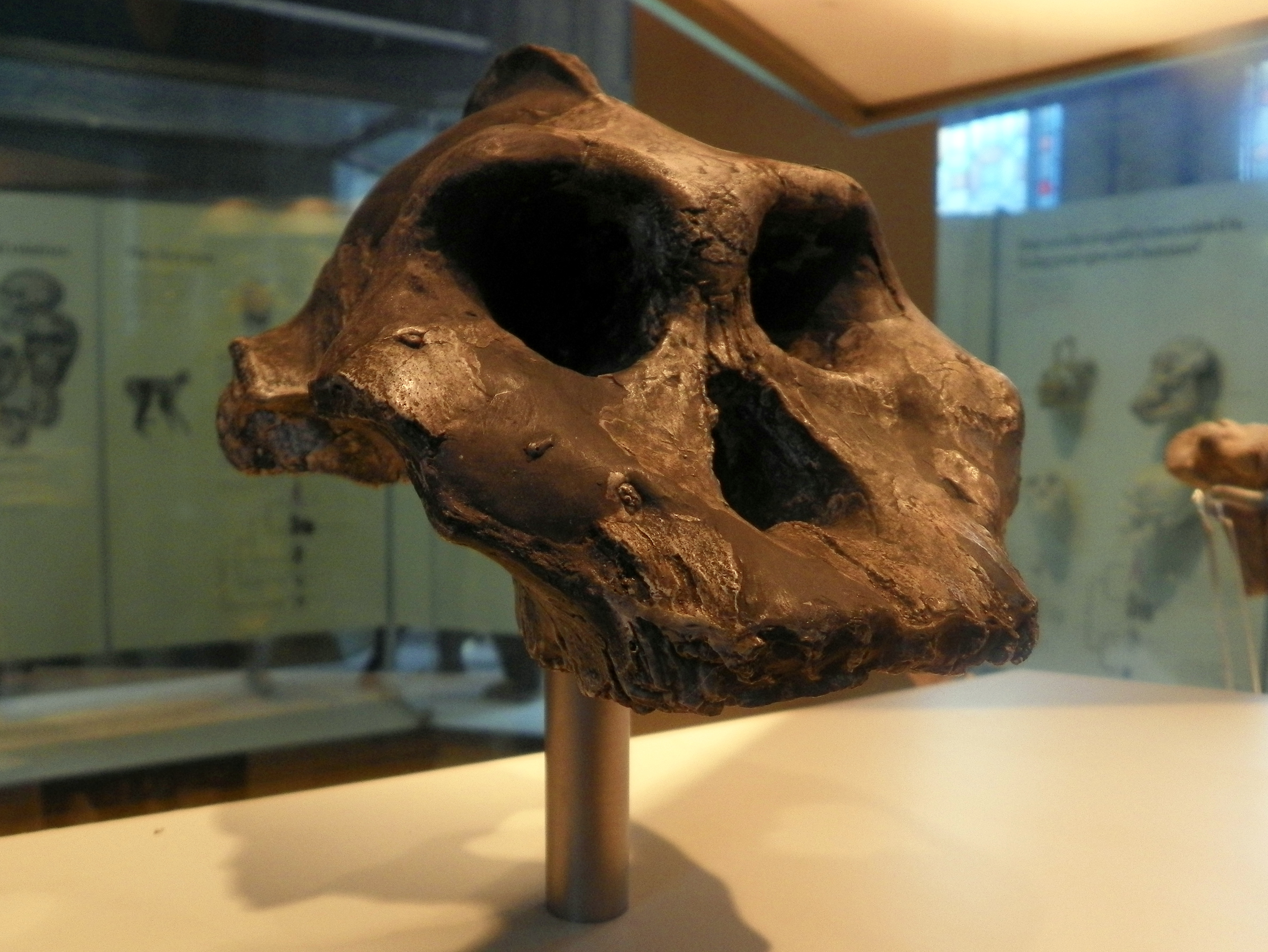
- KNM-WT 17000 cast
- Common name: KNM-WT 17000
- Species: Paranthropus aethiopicus
- Age: 2.5 million years
- Place discovered: Lake Turkana, Kenya
- Date discovered: 1985
- Discovered by: Alan Walker

KNM-WT 17000 (also known as "The Black Skull") is a fossilized adult skull of the species Paranthropus aethiopicus. It was discovered in West Turkana, Kenya by Alan Walker in 1985. Estimated to be 2.5 million years old, the fossil is an adult with an estimated cranial capacity of 410 cc.

The fossil's characteristics include a robust build with a prominent sagittal crest. Its distinct coloration is due to the high manganese content of the material it was embedded in. This fossilized cranium's face projects far outward from the forehead, has wide flared zygomatic arches, and has a large sagittal crest. The molar and premolar roots in the jaw are indicative of this early human having massive cheek teeth; an adaptation for heavy chewing. It is the only known adult skull of the species.

While its relationship to other fossil hominin taxa was not immediately clear at the time of its discovery, further studies have suggested it is a possible ancestor of two species: Paranthropus boisei, of east Africa, and Paranthropus robustus, of South Africa.

== See also ==
- List of fossil sites (with link directory)
- List of hominina (hominin) fossils (with images)
