= List of dinosaur specimens with nicknames =

This list of nicknamed dinosaur fossils is a list of fossil non-avian dinosaur specimens given informal names or nicknames, in addition to their institutional catalogue numbers. It excludes informal appellations that are purely descriptive (e.g., "the Fighting Dinosaurs", "the Trachodon Mummy").

For a similar list with non-dinosaurian species, see List of non-dinosaur fossil specimens with nicknames.

== Ornithischians ==
=== Marginocephlans ===
==== Centrosaurines ====
| Nickname | Catalogue number | Institution | Taxon | Age | Unit | Notes | Images |
|---|---|---|---|---|---|---|---|
| Antonio | TMP 1994.182.0001 | Royal Tyrell Museum of Palaeontology | Centrosaurus apertus | Late Cretaceous | | Named after male model. | |
| Ava | NSM PV 24660 | National Museum of Nature and Science | Furcatoceratops elucidans | Late Cretaceous (Middle Campanian) | Judith River Formation | | Ava the Furcatoceratops |
| Big Sam 2 | | Philip J. Currie Dinosaur Museum | Pachyrhinosaurus | Late Cretaceous | Wapiti Formation, Pipestone Creek | | |
| Boswell | | | Pachyrhinosaurus lakustai | Late Cretaceous (Late Campanian) | Wapiti Formation, Pipestone Creek | | |
| Bruce | TMP 1986.055.0206 | Royal Tyrell Museum of Palaeontology | Pachyrhinosaurus lakustai | Late Cretaceous (Late Campanian) | Wapiti Formation, Pipestone Creek | Since the bony "boss" of the animal was the only part of it that was discovered, it was named Bruce after Bruce "the Boss" Springsteen. | |
| Cybill | TMP 1986.055.0258 | Royal Tyrell Museum of Palaeontology | Pachyrhinosaurus lakustai | Late Cretaceous (Late Campanian) | Wapiti Formation, Pipestone Creek | Holotype specimen for P. lakustai, named in 1986 by Darren Tanke, after the character, Cybill Shepherd, from "Moonlighting." | |
| Elliot | | Natural History Museum of Los Angeles County | Einiosaurus procurvicornis | Late Cretaceous | | | |
| Frederik | EMK 0012 | Museum of Evolution | Lokiceratops rangiformis | Late Cretaceous (Campanian) | Judith River Formation, Kennedy Coulee | First holotype of a new dinosaur taxon reposited in Denmark | Skull of Frederik the Lokiceratops in various views |
| Hannah | UALVP 55900 | University of Alberta | Styracosaurus albertensis | Late Cretaceous (Campanian) | Dinosaur Park Formation, Alberta | Named after discoverer Scott Persons's pet dog Hannah | |
| Harvey | TMP 1989.055.1234 | Royal Tyrrell Museum of Palaeontology | Pachyrhinosaurus lakustai | Late Cretaceous | Wapiti Formation, Pipestone Creek | Named after the batman villain; Harvey Dent (also known as Two-face) due to a pathology on one side of its face, causing an asymmetrical appearance | |
| Leona | | Fukui Prefectural Dinosaur Museum | Medusaceratops lokii | Late Cretaceous (Middle Campanian) | Judith River Formation, Montana | | Medusaceratops |
| Liz Centro 2 | | Badlands Dinosaur Museum | Centrosaurus | Late Cretaceous (Campanian) | Oldman Formation, Montana | | |
| Louise | | Royal Tyrrell Museum of Palaeontology | Pachyrhinosaurus lakustai | Late Cretaceous | | | Pachyrhinosaurus composite skeleton |
| Lucky J | | Badlands Dinosaur Museum | Centrosaurus | Late Cretaceous (Campanian) | Judith River Formation, Montana | | |
| Mary | WDC DJR 001 | Wyoming Dinosaur Center | Medusaceratops lokii | Late Cretaceous (Middle Campanian) | Judith River Formation, Montana | Holotype specimen. | Medusaceratops |
| Mini Boss | in excavation | Philip J. Currie Dinosaur Museum | Pachyrhinosaurus | Late Cretaceous | | Juvenile skull | |

==== Chasmosaurines ====
| Nickname | Catalogue number | Institution | Taxon | Age | Unit | Notes | Images |
|---|---|---|---|---|---|---|---|
| Adam | | Museum of Evolution | Torosaurus | Late Cretaceous | | Has largest known skull for a dinosaur and land-living animal | |
| Afternoon Delight | MOR 2569 | Museum of the Rockies | Triceratops | Late Cretaceous (Maastrichtian, 68-66 Mya) | Hell Creek Formation, Montana | Juvenile disarticulated skull. Collected in 2006 | Afternoon Delight the Triceratops |
| Amalie | | Natural History Museum, Berlin & Museum of Evolution | Triceratops horridus | Late Cretaceous (Maastrichtian, 68-66 Mya) | | Named after owner Lars Fjeldsoe-Nielsen's daughter | |
| Anky Breaky Heart | MOR 3011 | Museum of the Rockies | Triceratops or Torosaurus | Late Cretaceous (Maastrichtian, 68-66 Mya) | Hell Creek Formation, Montana | Partial skull. Collected in 2009 | |
| Baker Trike | MOR 1604 | Museum of the Rockies | Triceratops | Late Cretaceous (Maastrichtian, 68-66 Mya) | Hell Creek Formation, Montana | Skull and syncervical. Collected in 2004 | |
| Bay Stud Coulee | UCMP 144297 | University of California Museum of Paleontology | Triceratops | Late Cretaceous (Maastrichtian, 68-66 Mya) | | | |
| Berkeley Baby | UCMP 154452R | University of California Museum of Paleontology | Triceratops | Late Cretaceous (Maastrichtian, 68-66 Mya) | Hell Creek Formation, Montana | Baby specimen | Replica skull of baby Triceratops |
| Big John | | Glazer Children's Museum | Triceratops horridus | Late Cretaceous (Maastrichtian, 68-66 Mya) | Hell Creek Formation | Largest known Triceratops skeleton; 60% complete with a skull that is 75% complete. Sold for €6.6 million (US$7.7 million) on 2021-10-21 | Big John the Triceratops |
| Bill | BDM | Badlands Dinosaur Museum | Triceratops | Late Cretaceous (Maastrichtian, 68-66 Mya) | Hell Creek Formation, Montana | | |
| Billy | BHI 4772 | Black Hills Institute of Geological Research | Torosaurus | Late Cretaceous (Maastrichtian, 68-66 Mya) | | | |
| Bob's Bonebed | UCMP 137266 | University of California Museum of Paleontology | Triceratops | Late Cretaceous (Maastrichtian, 68-66 Mya) | Hell Creek Formation, Montana | Subadult specimen | |
| Bob | | | Triceratops | Late Cretaceous (Maastrichtian, 68-66 Mya) | Hell Creek Formation, North Dakota | Partial skeleton | |
| Calli | TMP2014.022.0022 | Royal Tyrrell Museum | Triceratops | Late Cretaceous (Maastrichtian, 69–68 Mya) | Willow Creek Formation, Alberta | Skull | Skull of Calli the Triceratops |
| Cheryll | | Palm Beach Museum of Natural History | Triceratops | Late Cretaceous (Maastrichtian) | | Only specimen of non-avian dinosaur in south Florida | |
| Cliff | | Museum of Science (Boston) | Triceratops | Late Cretaceous (Maastrichtian, 68-66 Mya) | | | Cliff the Triceratops |
| Cliffhanger | MOR 3045 | Museum of the Rockies | Triceratops | Late Cretaceous (Maastrichtian, 68-66 Mya) | Hell Creek Formation, Montana | Frill and other material. Collected in 2010 | |
| Count Trikeula | BDM | Badlands Dinosaur Museum | Triceratops | Late Cretaceous (Maastrichtian, 68-66 Mya) | Hell Creek Formation, Montana | | |
| Coyote Basin | UCMP 174838 | University of California Museum of Paleontology | Triceratops | Late Cretaceous (Maastrichtian, 68-66 Mya) | | | |
| Dave's Nose | UCMP 128561 | University of California Museum of Paleontology | Triceratops | Late Cretaceous (Maastrichtian, 68-66 Mya) | Hell Creek Formation, Montana | Originally described as “Ugrosaurus olsoni” | |
| DF Juvie Trike III | MOR 2951 | Museum of the Rockies | Triceratops | Late Cretaceous (Maastrichtian, 68-66 Mya) | Hell Creek Formation, Montana | Disarticulated skull and postcrania. Collected in 2008 | The juvenile DF Juvie Trike III mounted skeleton in the fore ground and the adult Yoshi's Trike in the background. |
| Dio | | Royal Ontario Museum | Triceratops | Late Cretaceous (Maastrichtian, 68-66 Mya) | Hell Creek Formation, Montana | Named after Ronnie James Dio | |
| Dirk | RGM.1332500 | Naturalis Biodiversity Center | Triceratops horridus | Late Cretaceous (Maastrichtian, 68-66 Mya) | Lance Formation, Wyoming | Named after volunteer | Dirk the Triceratops |
| Doyle | AMNH 5116 | American Museum of Natural History | Triceratops or Torosaurus | Late Cretaceous (Maastrichtian, 68-66 Mya) | | | Doyle |
| Ducky Tail | MOR 6648 | Museum of the Rockies | Triceratops | Late Cretaceous (Maastrichtian, 68-66 Mya) | Hell Creek Formation, Montana | Juvenile parietal and squamosal. Collected in 2009 | |
| Fafnir | SMM P60.2.1, P62.1.1, P60.5.1, P63.11.1, P63.2.1, P60.6.1 (composite) | Science Museum of Minnesota | Triceratops | Late Cretaceous (Maastrichtian, 68-66 Mya) | Hell Creek Formation | Named after the dragon in both Norse mythology and Richard Wagner's opera Siegfried; coined by his granddaughter. | Fafnir the Triceratops |
| Getaway Trike | MOR 1120 | Museum of the Rockies | Triceratops | Late Cretaceous (Maastrichtian, 68-66 Mya) | Hell Creek Formation, Montana | Disarticulated skull. Collected in 1999 | Getaway Trike |
| Gundy | | Barnes County Historical Society Museum | Triceratops prorsus | Late Cretaceous (Maastrichtian, 68-66 Mya) | Hell Creek Formation, South Dakota | More than 80% complete | |
| Harley's Baby | MOR 154452 | Museum of the Rockies | Triceratops | Late Cretaceous (Maastrichtian, 68-66 Mya) | | | |
| Hatcher | USNM 4842, BSP 1964 I 458(composite) | National Museum of Natural History | Triceratops | Late Cretaceous (Maastrichtian, 68-66 Mya) | | Named after John Bell Hatcher | Hatcher the Triceratops |
| Haxby Trike | MOR 1625 | Museum of the Rockies | Triceratops | Late Cretaceous (Maastrichtian, 68-66 Mya) | Hell Creek Formation, Montana | Partial skull. Collected in 2004 | |
| Headless Henry | | Missouri Institute of Natural Science | Triceratops | Late Cretaceous (Maastrichtian, 68-66 Mya) | | One of the largest known specimens. Named after Matt Forir's son. | |
| Hellboy | TMP 2005.055.0001 | Royal Tyrrell Museum | Regaliceratops peterhewsi | Late Cretaceous (Maastrichtian, 68-67 Mya) | St. Mary River Formation | Named after comic book character of the same name, and also in reference to the challenging process of excavating and preparing the specimen. | Skull of Hellboy |
| Henry | | Palm Beach Museum of Natural History | Triceratops | Late Cretaceous (Maastrichtian, 68-66 Mya) | | Named after Henry Fairfield Osborn | |
| High Ceratopsian | UCMP 137263 | University of California Museum of Paleontology | Triceratops | Late Cretaceous (Maastrichtian, 68-66 Mya) | Hell Creek Formation, Montana | | |
| Homer | BMRP 2006.4.1 | Burpee Museum of Natural History | Triceratops | Late Cretaceous (Maastrichtian, 68-66 Mya) | Hell Creek Formation | | Homer the Triceratops. |
| Horridus | NMV P256878 | Melbourne Museum | Triceratops horridus | Late Cretaceous (Maastrichtian, 68-66 Mya) | Hell Creek Formation, Montana | Named after the species name. 85% complete by bone count; among most well-preserved of the genus | 'Horridus', the most complete Triceratops fossil known, on display at the Melbourne Museum. |
| Jason | | Louisiana Art and Science Museum | Triceratops | Late Cretaceous (Maastrichtian, 68-66 Mya) | Hell Creek Formation | Named after discoverer, a rancher who first found it. | |
| JD Trike 12 | MOR 3056 | Museum of the Rockies | Triceratops | Late Cretaceous (Maastrichtian, 68-66 Mya) | Hell Creek Formation, Montana | Juvenile skull elements. Collected in 2007 | |
| JD Trike 14 | MOR 2950 | Museum of the Rockies | Triceratops | Late Cretaceous (Maastrichtian, 68-66 Mya) | Hell Creek Formation, Montana | Partial skull. Collected in 2007 | |
| Joe's Trike | MOR 2923 | Museum of the Rockies | Triceratops | Late Cretaceous (Maastrichtian, 68-66 Mya) | Hell Creek Formation, Montana | Articulated skull. Collected in 2007 | |
| Juvenile Trike | UCMP 159233 | University of California Museum of Paleontology | Triceratops | Late Cretaceous (Maastrichtian, 68-66 Mya) | | | |
| Kelsey | TCM 2001.93.1 | The Children's Museum of Indianapolis | Triceratops | Late Cretaceous (Maastrichtian, 68-66 Mya) | | | |
| Kevin | | Rocky Mountain Dinosaur Resource Center | | | | | |
| Lane | HMNS 2006.1743.00 or HMNS PV.1506 | Houston Museum of Natural Science | Triceratops horridus | Late Cretaceous (Maastrichtian, 68-66 Mya) | Lance Formation, Wyoming | Very complete. Preserves large sections of skin impressions. Collected in 2002 | Lane the Triceratops |
| Larry | BDM | Badlands Dinosaur Museum | Triceratops | Late Cretaceous (Maastrichtian, 68-66 Mya) | Hell Creek Formation, North Dakota | Has a pathological tail | |
| Laurel's Trike | ROM 2938 | Royal Ontario Museum | Triceratops | Late Cretaceous (Maastrichtian, 68-66 Mya) | | | |
| Little Horny Devil | MOR 3064 | Museum of the Rockies | Triceratops | Late Cretaceous (Maastrichtian, 68-66 Mya) | Hell Creek Formation, Montana | Skull elements. Collected in 2010 | |
| Mark's Scavenged Trike | MOR 2570 | Museum of the Rockies | Triceratops | Late Cretaceous (Maastrichtian, 68-66 Mya) | Hell Creek Formation, Montana | Skull elements. Collected in 2006 | |
| MORT | MOR 004 | Museum of the Rockies | Triceratops | Late Cretaceous (Maastrichtian, 68-66 Mya) | Hell Creek Formation, Montana | Articulated skull. Collected in 1981 | Mort the Triceratops |
| Nana | DSTtD-0035 | | Triceratops | Late Cretaceous (Maastrichtian, 68-66 Mya) | | | |
| Nicole | | Tate Geological Museum | Torosaurus | | | | |
| Ozzy | | Geoworld Gallery, Tucson AZ | Triceratops | Late Cretaceous (Maastrictian) | Hell Creek Formation, Montana | Named after Ozzy Osbourne1948-2025 | |
| Pops | DMNH 48617 | Denver Museum of Natural History | Triceratops horridus | Late Cretaceous (Maastrichtian, 69 Mya) | Laramie Formation, Weld County, Colorado | Found in 1982 | Pops the Triceratops |
| Quittin' Time | MOR 2574 | Museum of the Rockies | Triceratops | Late Cretaceous (Maastrichtian, 68-66 Mya) | Hell Creek Formation | Collected in 2006 | |
| Raymond | NSM-PV 20379 | National Museum of Nature and Science | Triceratops | Late Cretaceous (Maastrichtian, 68-66 Mya) | | | Raymond the Triceratops |
| Red Phantom | | | Triceratops | Late Cretaceous (Maastrichtian, 68-66 Mya) | | | |
| Roar | | Naturhistorisk museum | Triceratops | Late Cretaceous (Maastrichtian, 68-66 Mya) | | Name comes from donor of specimen. | |
| Ruben's Triceratops | UCMP 113697 | University of California Museum of Paleontology | Triceratops | Late Cretaceous (Maastrichtian, 68-66 Mya) | Hell Creek Formation | | |
| Russel Basin Triceratops | UCMP 136092 | University of California Museum of Paleontology | Triceratops | Late Cretaceous (Maastrichtian, 68-66 Mya) | Hell Creek Formation | | |
| Sam | | | Triceratops | Late Cretaceous (Maastrichtian, 68-66 Mya) | | After the late actor Sam Neill, who died the day of excavation. | |
| Sara | | Redpath Museum | Triceratops horridus | Late Cretaceous (Maastrichtian, 68-66 Mya) | Eastend, Saskatchewan | Teenage skull specimen | Sara Triceratops skull |
| Seth's Trike | MOR 2979 | Museum of the Rockies | Triceratops | Late Cretaceous (Maastrichtian, 68-66 Mya) | Hell Creek Formation, Montana | Partial skull. Collected in 2008 | |
| SG-5 | MOR 1110 | Museum of the Rockies | Triceratops | Late Cretaceous (Maastrichtian, 68-66 Mya) | Hell Creek Formation, Montana | Disarticulated skull. Collected in 1999 | |
| Shady | | Westminster College | Triceratops | Late Cretaceous (Maastrichtian, 68-66 Mya) | South Dakota | Found in 2019. Excavated by Westminster College. | |
| Sierra skull | MOR 1199 | Museum of the Rockies | Triceratops | Late Cretaceous (Maastrichtian, 68-66 Mya) | Hell Creek Formation, Montana | Disarticulated skull. Collected in 2003 | Sierra Triceratops skull |
| Situ But Sad | MOR 2999 | Museum of the Rockies | Triceratops | Late Cretaceous (Maastrichtian, 68-66 Mya) | Hell Creek Formation, Montana | Partial skull. Collected in 2009 | |
| Six O' Clock Trike | MOR 2985 | Museum of the Rockies | Triceratops | Late Cretaceous (Maastrichtian, 68-66 Mya) | Hell Creek Formation, Montana | Skull elements. Collected in 2008 | |
| Spike | | New Mexico Museum of Natural History | Pentaceratops | Late Cretaceous (Campanian, 76-73 Mya) | Kirtland Formation | | |
| Supernasal | MOR 2972 | Museum of the Rockies | Triceratops | Late Cretaceous (Maastrichtian, 68-66 Mya) | Hell Creek Formation, Montana | Partial skull. Collected in 2008 | |
| Three Amigos | MOR 2982 | Museum of the Rockies | Triceratops | Late Cretaceous (Maastrichtian, 68-66 Mya) | Hell Creek Formation, Montana | Partial skull. Collected in 2008 | |
| TriceraJosh | | Royal Saskatchewan Museum | Triceratops | Late Cretaceous (Maastrichtian, 68-66 Mya) | | | |
| TriSarahTops | MOR 2980 | Museum of the Rockies | Triceratops | Late Cretaceous (Maastrichtian, 68-66 Mya) | Hell Creek Formation, Montana | Squamosal. Collected in 2008 | |
| Tritan | | Royal Saskatchewan Museum | Triceratops | Late Cretaceous (Maastrichtian, 68-66 Mya) | | | |
| Tiny | DMNS EPV.128000 | Denver Museum of Nature and Science | Torosaurus | Late Cretaceous (Maastrichtian, 68-66 Mya) | Colorado | First recorded Torosaurus from Colorado, the most complete Torosaurus ever found. Found in 2017 and originally thought to be a Triceratops. | Tiny the Torosaurus |
| Willard | | Sauriermuseum Aathal | Triceratops prorsus | Late Cretaceous (Maastrichtian, 68-66 Mya) | Hell Creek Formation, North Dakota | Partial skeleton. One of the largest T. prorsus skeletons. Collected in 2017. | Mounted skeleton of Willard |
| Yoshi's Trike | MOR 3027 | Museum of the Rockies | Triceratops | Late Cretaceous (Maastrichtian, 68-66 Mya) | Hell Creek Formation, Montana | Has longest horns found in any Triceratops known. Collected in 2010 | Yoshi's Trike mounted skeleton on the left |

==== Leptoceratopsids ====
| Nickname | Catalogue number | Institution | Taxon | Age | Unit | Notes | Images |
|---|---|---|---|---|---|---|---|
| Antonio | TMP 1994.182.0001 | Royal Tyrell Museum of Palaeontology | Centrosaurus apertus | Late Cretaceous | | Named after male model. | Buster |
| Frannie | The Children's Museum of Indianapolis | The Children's Museum of Indianapolis | Prenoceratops | Late Cretaceous | St. Mary's Formation | Named after Fran Julian, a supporter of The Children's Museum. | |
| Queenie | | Mokpo Natural History Museum | Prenoceratops pieganensis | Late Cretaceous (Late Campanian 74 Mya) | Two Medicine Formation, Montana | | |

==== Pachycephalosaurids ====
| Nickname | Catalogue number | Institution | Taxon | Age | Unit | Notes | Images |
|---|---|---|---|---|---|---|---|
| Mr. Potatohead | MOR 3040 | Museum of the Rockies | Sphaerotholus buchholtzae | Late Cretaceous | Hell Creek Formation, Garfield Co., Montana | | |
| Sandy | | National Museum of Nature and Science | Pachycephalosaurus sp. | Late Cretaceous (Maastrichtian) | Hell Creek Formation, South Dakota | Most complete specimen of the genus so far. Found in 1994. | Sandy |

=== Ornithopods ===
| Nickname | Catalogue number | Institution | Taxon | Age | Unit | Notes | Images |
|---|---|---|---|---|---|---|---|
| April | MANCH LL. 12275 | Manchester Museum | Tenontosaurus tilleti | Lower Cretaceous | Cloverly Formation | Highly complete. Named after wife of preparator. May represent male specimen. | |
| AMNH Mummy | AMNH FARB 5060 | American Museum of Natural History | Edmontosaurus annectens | Late Cretaceous (Maastrichtian; 69–66 Mya) | Lance Formation, Wyoming | Skeleton with extensive skin impressions. Found in 1908 | AMNH Mummy |
| Antonio | SC 57021 | Civic Museum of Natural History, Trieste | Tethyshadros insularis | Late Cretaceous (80 Mya) | Liburnia Formation | | Antonio the Tethyshadros |
| Arky | SMA 0265 | Sauriermuseum Athal | Camptosaurus sp. | Late Jurassic | | | |
| Baby Dry | CM 11340 | Carnegie Museum of Natural History | Dryosaurus elderae | Late Jurassic | Morrison formation | Juvenile specimen. | |
| Barbara | NMZ 1000010/SMA 0010 | Aathal Dinosaur Museum | Nanosaurus agilis | Late Jurassic | Morrison Formation, Howe Ranch, Wyoming | | |
| Becky's Giant | MOR 1609 | Museum of the Rockies | Edmontosaurus annectens? | Late Cretaceous (Maastrichtian) | | A maxilla. Its 570 mm size indicates it is one of the largest specimens of Edmontosaurus. | |
| The Beast | FMNH | Field Museum of Natural History | Parrosaurus missouriensis | Late Cretaceous (Campanian) | Missouri | | |
| Boggy Lips | | Black Hills Institute | Edmontosaurus | Late Cretaceous (Maastrichtian) | Lance Formation | Has preserved skin | |
| Bruno | SC 57247 | Civic Museum of Natural History, Trieste | Tethyshadros insularis | Late Cretaceous (Maastrichtian) | Liburnia Formation | | Bruno the Tethyshadros |
| Burt | | Barnes County Historical Society Museum | Thescelosaurus neglectus | Late Cretaceous (Maastrichtian) | | | |
| Dakota | NDGS 2000 | North Dakota Heritage Center & State Museum | Edmontosaurus cf. annectens | Late Cretaceous (Maastrichtian; 69–66 Mya) | Hell Creek Formation, North Dakota | Partial skeleton. Very well preserved, with large sections of skin impressions. | Closeup of Dakota skin impression |
| Diana | | Houston Museum of Natural Science | Edmontosaurus | Late Cretaceous (Maastrichtian) | | | |
| Dinosaur Joe | RAM 14000 | Raymond M. Alf Museum of Paleontology | Parasaurolophus cyrtocristatus | Late Cretaceous (Campanian; 75.5 Mya) | Kaiparowits Formation | Juvenile specimen, named after volunteer Joe Augustyn | Left side skeleton of Joe |
| Elvis | | Phillips County Museum | Brachylophosaurus | Late Cretaceous | | | |
| Ed Sr. | UCRC PV30 | University of Chicago Research Collection | Edmontosaurus annectens | Late Cretaceous (Maastrichtian; 69–66 Mya) | Lance Formation, Wyoming | Partial skeleton with extensive skin impressions | |
| Ed Jr. | UCRC PV31 | University of Chicago Research Collection | Edmontosaurus annectens | Late Cretaceous (Maastrichtian; 69–66 Mya) | Lance Formation, Wyoming | Partial skeleton with extensive skin impressions | |
| Gary | UALVP 60425 | University of Alberta Paleotology Museum | Edmontosaurus | Late Cretaceous (Maastrichtian) | | | |
| George | | Pacific Museum of the Earth, Vancouver | Lambeosaurus | Late Cretaceous (Campanian; 75.5 Mya) | Dinosaur Park Formation, Alberta | Composite skeleton. Found in 1913. | |
| Georgette | | Korea Institute of Geoscience | Maiasaura peeblesorum | Late Cretaceous | | Juvenile specimen | |
| Hannah (II) | | Museum of Geology & Natural History, West Virginia | Edmontosaurus | Late Cretaceous (Maastrichtian) | Hell Creek Formation | Uncovered in 2003. Only genuine non-avian dinosaur specimen in the state of West Virginia. | |
| Haddy | | Academy of Natural Sciences of Drexel University | Hadrosaurus foulkii | Late Cretaceous | Woodbury Formation, New Jersey | Reconstructed skeleton | |
| Henrietta | | Royal Ontario Museum | Maiasaura peeblesorum | Late Cretaceous | | | |
| Isauria | IGM 6583 | Instituto de Geologia of the Universidad Nacional Autonoma de Mexico | Latirhinus | Late Cretaceous (Campanian; 72.5 Mya) | Cerro del Pueblo Formation | | |
| Karen | | Fukui Prefectural Dinosaur Museum | Prosaurolophus blackfeetensis | Late Cretaceous | | | |
| Leonardo | JRF 115H | The Children's Museum of Indianapolis | Brachylophosaurus canadensis | Late Cretaceous (Early Campanian; ~81–77 Mya) | Judith River Formation, Montana | Mummified specimen | |
| Leon | | Houston Museum of Natural Science | Edmontosaurus | Late Cretaceous (Maastrichtian) | | | |
| Lizzie | 2000 P-02 | University of Alaska Museum | Hadrosauridae indet. | Late Cretaceous (Middle Turonian) | Matanuska Formation | First occurrence of a hadrosaur in south-central Alaska, 1 out of only 4 vertebrate fossils from the entire Wrangellia Composite Terrane, & first associated skeleton of an individual dinosaur in Alaska. | |
| Mama Dry | CM 3392 | Carnegie Museum of Natural History | Dryosaurus elderae | Late Jurassic | Morrison formation | Sub-adult specimen. | |
| Marco | | | Brachylophosaurus canadensis | Late Cretaceous (Campanian; 75 Mya) | Judith River Formation, Montana | Found in the same area as the Leonardo mummy | |
| Mary Ann | | Naranjo Museum of Natural History | Edmontosaurus | Late Cretaceous (Maastrichtian) | Hell Creek Formation, Montana | Found in 2008. Has well preserved skin impressions on foot and tail. Named after Mary Ann Naranjo. | |
| Maximus | | Private specimen | Thescelosaurus neglectus | Late Cretaceous (Maastrichtian; 66 Mya) | Hell Creek Formation, South Dakota | Young adult specimen. | |
| Medusa | | Winona State University | Edmontosaurus | Late Cretaceous (Maastrichtian; 66 Mya) | Hell Creek Formation, North Dakota | Specimen preserves skin and tendons. Found in 2024 | |
| Mouse | | Royal Tyrrell Museum of Palaeontology | Hadrosauridae indet. | Late Cretaceous (Campanian) | Dinosaur Park Formation | Named after a mouse skeleton found in its plaster jacket after being left out for years. | |
| Nadine | | Fukui Prefectural Dinosaur Museum | Hypacrosaurus stebingeri | Late Cretaceous | | Juvenile specimen | |
| Papa Dry | CM 87688 | Carnegie Museum of Natural History | Dryosaurus elderae | Late Jurassic | Morrison Formation | Partially preserved adult skull | |
| Peanut | | | Brachylophosaurus | Late Cretaceous (Campanian) | | | |
| Pink Iggy | MIWG.5126 | Dinosaur Isle | Iguanodon | Early Cretaceous | | Named after the bones' pink colouration due to the minerals in the rocks | |
| Primus | SC 57022 | Civic Museum of Natural History, Trieste | Tethyshadros | Late Cretaceous (Maastrichtian) | Liburnia Formation | | Primus the Tethyshadros |
| Roberta | | Great Plains Dinosaur Museum and Field Station | Brachylophosaurus | Late Cretaceous (Campanian) | | Mummified remains | Roberta |
| Rocco | | | Tethyshadros insularis | Late Cretaceous (80 Mya) | Liburnia Formation | | |
| Rod's Duck | uncatalogued | Badland's Dinosaur Museum | ?Brachylophosaurus sp. | Late Cretaceous, (Campanian; 76 Mya) | Judith River Formation | A young individual, possibly of the genus Brachylophosaurus died at approximately the age of 2–3 years. | |
| Ruth | | National Museum Cardiff | Edmontosaurus annectens | Late Cretaceous (Maastrichtian; 66 Mya) | Hell Creek Formation | Named after Ruth Mason, who discovered fossils of Edmonotosaurus on her ranch, and provided the name of the Ruth Mason Quarry | |
| Scorpio | | | Lambeosaurus | Late Cretaceous (Campanian) | Dinosaur Park Formation | Has skin impressions. | |
| Secundus | SC 57026 | Civic Museum of Natural History, Trieste | Tethyshadros insularis | Late Cretaceous (Maastrichtian) | Liburnia Formation | | |
| Senckenberg mummy or Edmond | SMF R 4036 | Senckenberg Museum | Edmontosaurus annectens | Late Cretaceous (Maastrichtian; 69–66 Mya) | Lance Formation, Wyoming | Skeleton with extensive skin impressions. Found in 1910 | Senckenberg Mummy |
| Skinny | | Royal Saskatchewan Museum | Edmontosaurus | Late Cretaceous (Maastrichtian) | Saskatchewan | Excavated in 1995. Found in same area as Scotty the T. rex. Has well preserved scale impressions. | |
| Tertius | | Civic Museum of Natural History, Trieste | Tethyshadros | Late Cretaceous (Maastrichtian) | Liburnia Formation | | |
| Tyke | TMP 1998.050.0001 | Royal Tyrrell Museum of Palaeontology | Prosaurolophus maximus | Late Cretaceous (Campanian) | Bearpaw Formation, St. Mary River, Deerfield Hutterite Colony, near Magrath | Named Tyke in reference to its young age. | |
| Wally | | | Camptosaurus | Late Jurassic | | | |
| Walter | | Colorado Northwestern Field Museum | Hadrosauridae indet. | Late Cretaceous (Campanian) | | Named after the Great Dane who discovered it on a walk with Colorado Northwestern teacher Ellis Thompson-Ellis. | |
| Willo | NCSM 15728 | North Carolina Museum of Natural Sciences | Thescelosaurus | Late Cretaceous (Maastrichtian) | Hell Creek Formation | Falsely thought to have fossilised heart intact. | Willo the Thescelosaurus |
| X-rex | MOR 1142 | Museum of the Rockies | Edmontosaurus | Late Cretaceous (Maastrichtian) | Hell Creek Formation | Tail with skin impressions. Size indicates it is one of the largest specimens of Edmontosaurus. | Closeup of X-rex |
| Zara and Zelda | NHMO | Natural History Museum at the University of Oslo | Hypacrosaurus stebingeri | Late Cretaceous (Campanian; 80-74 Mya) | Blackfeet Indian Reservation, Montana, Two Medicine Formation | Adult and juvenile specimens found together | |
| Zdravko | | Civic Museum of Natural History, Trieste | Tethyshadros | Late Cretaceous (Maastrichtian) | Liburnia Formation | | |

=== Thyreophora ===
| Nickname | Catalogue number | Institution | Taxon | Age | Unit | Notes | Images |
|---|---|---|---|---|---|---|---|
| Apex | | American Museum of Natural History | Stegosaurus | Late Jurassic (Kimmeridgian; 150 Mya) | Colorado | Discovered in 2022. Very well preserved adult specimen. | Apex the Stegosaurus |
| Dante | | | Edmontonia rugosidens | Late Cretaceous | | | |
| Easton | | National Museum of Natural History | Nodosauridae | Late Cretaceous (Maastrichtian) | Lance Formation | Cast on display at the Brazos Valley Museum of Natural History | |
| Fantasia | | | Hesperosaurus mjosi | Late Jurassic (Kimmeridgian; 155 Mya) | Morrison Formation, Dana Quarry, Wyoming | | |
| Gamera | CEUM 1522 | USU Eastern Prehistoric Museum | Nodosauridae indet. (part of the Polacanthinae clade) | Early Cretaceous (Berriasian; 145-139 Mya) | Cedar Mountain Formation (Yellow Cat member) | Named after the turtle kaiju of the same name | |
| Gates | GPDM 205 | Great Plains Dinosaur Museum and Field Station | Stegosauria indet | Late Jurassic | Morrison Formation, JRDI 5ES Quarry, Montana | Partial forelimb. Collected in 2004. | Radius of Gates the Stegosaurus |
| Giffen | GPDM 178 | Great Plains Dinosaur Museum and Field Station | Stegosauria indet | Late Jurassic | Morrison Formation, Montana | A partial skeleton. Named after town of Giffen, Montana where originally found. Collected in 2003 & 2004. | Skull of Giffen the Stegosaurus |
| Lily | SMA L02 | Sauriermuseum Aathal | Hesperosaurus mjosi | Late Jurassic (Kimmeridgian; 156 Mya) | | Named after volunteers Nicola and Rabea Lillich | Skull of Lily |
| Morritz | SMA 3074-FV01 | | Hesperosaurus | Late Jurassic (Kimmeridgian; 156 Mya) | | Named after character from Max and Moritz | |
| Olive | NSM PV 20381 | National Museum of Nature and Science | Euoplocephalus tutus or Scolosaurus cutleri | Late Cretaceous (Campanian) | | Partially reconstructed | Skull of Olive |
| Peggy | FPDM V-31 | Fukui Prefectural Dinosaur Museum | Euoplocephalus | Late Cretaceous (Campanian) | | | |
| Roadkill | USNM V 4934 | National Museum of Natural History | Stegosaurus stenops | Late Jurassic | Morrison Formation | Found articulated, as well as first with plates preserved as they were. | Roadkill the Stegosaurus |
| Sarah/Sophie | NHMUK R36730 | Natural History Museum of London | Stegosaurus | Late Jurassic (Kimmeridgian; 150 Mya) | Morrison Formation | Extremely complete | Sophie the Stegosaurus |
| Sherman | ROM 75860 | Royal Ontario Museum | Zuul crurivastator | Late Cretaceous (Campanian; 75 Mya) | Judith River Formation, Montana | Holotype specimen | The skull Zuul holotype |
| Stephanie | | Museum of Evolution | Hesperosaurus mjosi | Late Jurassic | Morrison Formation, Wyoming | | |
| Uma | | Royal Tyrrell Museum | Euoplocephalus tutus | Late Cretaceous (Campanian) | | | |
| Victoria | SMA 0018 | Aathal Dinosaur Museum | Hesperosaurus | Late Jurassic (Kimmeridgian; 156 Mya) | | | Mounted skeleton of Victoria |

=== Miscellaneous ===
| Nickname | Catalogue number | Institution | Taxon | Age | Unit | Notes | Images |
|---|---|---|---|---|---|---|---|
| Tucki | AM 4766 | Albany Museum | Heterodontosaurus tucki | Early Jurassic (Hettangian; 200 Mya) | Elliot Formation | | Tucki |

== Saurischians ==
=== Sauropodomorphs ===
==== Basal Sauropodomorphs and Sauropods; misc. ====
| Nickname | Catalogue number | Institution | Taxon | Age | Unit | Notes | Images |
|---|---|---|---|---|---|---|---|
| Alan | YORYM: 2001.9337 | Yorkshire Museum | Sauropoda indet. | Middle Jurassic (Aalenian; 175 Mya) | Saltwick Formation | Oldest known sauropod specimen of the UK. | |
| Big Momma | BP/1/4934 | Bernard Price Institute for Palaeontological Research, University of Witwatersrand, Johannesburg, South Africa | Massospondylus carinatus | Early Jurassic | Elliot Formation, South Africa | Neotype of the genus | |
| George | LCM G468.1968 | Leicester Museum & Art Gallery | Cetiosaurus oxionensis | Middle Jurassic (Bajocian) | Rutland Formation | Also known simply as the Rutland Dinosaur. | |
| Grey Skull | BP/1/4779 | Evolutionary Studies Institute, University of the Witwatersrand | Ngwevu intloko | Early Jurassic | Clarens Formation, Fouriesburg district, South Africa | Holotype | |
| Monica | | Naturalis Biodiversity Center | Plateosaurus | Late Triassic (Norian) | | Found at Frick, Switzerland. Named after volunteer. | |

==== Diplodocoideans ====
| Nickname | Catalogue number | Institution | Taxon | Age | Unit | Notes | Images |
|---|---|---|---|---|---|---|---|
| Andrew | CMC VP14128 | Cincinnati Museum Center | Diplodocus | Late Jurassic (Kimmeridgian) | Morrison Formation (Salt Wash Member) | Juvenile skull and vertebrae. Named after Andrew Carnegie | Art Reconstruction |
| Appolonia | | Lee Kong Chian Natural History Museum | Diplodocidae sp. (informally known as "Barackosaurus" and "Amphicoelias brontodiplodocus") | Late Jurassic | Morrison Formation | | |
| Big Monty | | | Haplocanthosaurus | Late Jurassic | Morrison Formation | Private specimen. | |
| Brösmeli | MAB011899 | Oertijdmuseum | Ardetosaurus viator | Late Jurassic | Morrison Formation | Name means "Crumbly" in the Swiss German | Composite skeleton |
| Dippy | CM 84 | Carnagie Museum | Diplodocus | Late Jurassic | Morrison Formation | | Dippy the Diplodocus |
| Dolly | MOR 7029 | Great Plains Dinosaur Museum | Diplodocinae indet. | Late Jurassic | Morrison Formation, Montana | Named after singer Dolly Parton. Contains evidence of being affected by respiratory disease, specifically Airsacculitis. Collected from 1990 to 2015 | Cervical vertebra of Dolly |
| Gnatalie | | Natural History Museum of Los Angeles County | Diplodocinae indet. | Late Jurassic | Morrison Formation | Named for the gnats that relentlessly harassed excavators. A distinct green color due to celadonite. | |
| Gordo | ROM 3670 | Royal Ontario Museum | Barosaurus lentus | Late Jurassic | Morrison Formation | Named after museum curator Gordon Edmund. Originally from Carnegie Museum of Natural History. | Gordo the Barosaurus |
| Happy | CMNH 10380 | Cleveland Museum of Natural History | Haplocanthosaurus delfsi | Late Jurassic (Kimmeridgian) | Morrison Formation | | Happy at the Cleveland Museum |
| HQ One | SMA 0003 | | Diplodocus | Late Jurassic | Morrison Formation | | |
| HQ Two | SMA 0004 | | Kaatedocus | Late Jurassic | Morrison Formation | | |
| Jimbo | WDC DMJ-021 | Wyoming Dinosaur Center | Supersaurus | Late Jurassic | Morrison Formation | | |
| Junior | | | Apatosaurus | Late Jurassic (Kimmeridgian) | Morrison Formation | | |
| Max | SMA 00011 | Aathal Dinosaur Museum | Galeamopus | Late Jurassic | Morrison Formation | | |
| Misty | | Natural History Museum of Denmark | Diplodocus sp. | Late Jurassic | Morrison Formation | | On display |
| Prince | | Lee Kong Chian Natural History Museum | Diplodocidae sp. (informally known as "Barackosaurus" and "Amphicoelias brontodiplodocus") | Late Jurassic | Morrison Formation | | Prince (Twinky to right and Appolonia to left) |
| Straight Arrow | | | Diplodocus | Late Jurassic | Morrison Formation | Named after the straight line of vertebrae as they were found. | |
| Twinky | | Lee Kong Chian Natural History Museum | Diplodocidae sp. (informally known as "Barackosaurus" and "Amphicoelias brontodiplodocus") | Late Jurassic | Morrison Formation | | Twinky (Prince and Appolonia to right) |

==== Macronarians ====
| Nickname | Catalogue number | Institution | Taxon | Age | Unit | Notes | Images |
|---|---|---|---|---|---|---|---|
| Alex | AODF 836 | Australian Age of Dinosaurs Museum of Natural History | Diamantinasaurus matildae | Late Cretaceous (Cenomanian-Turonian; 94 Mya) | Winton Formation, Queensland | Found in 2004, identified as Diamantinasaurus in 2016. Preserves braincase. | (b) Right scapula AODF 836. |
| Ann | AODF 0906 | Australian Age of Dinosaurs | Diamantinasaurus matildae | Late Cretaceous (Cenomanian-Turonian; 94 Mya) | Winton Formation, Queensland | | Skull of Ann |
| Archbishop | NHM R5937 | Natural History Museum, London | Brachiosauridae indet. | Late Jurassic | Tendaguru Formation | | The Archbishop |
| Clancy | QMF 7292 | Queensland Museum | Wintonotitan wattsi | Late Cretaceous (Cenomanian-Turonian) | Winton Formation, Queensland | Named after Clancy of the Overflow. Holotype specimen. | Clancy |
| Cooper | EMF 102 | Eromanga Natural History Museum | Australotitan cooperensis | Cretaceous (Cenomanian-Turonian) | Winton Formation, Queensland | Named after Cooper Creek. Holotype specimen. | Femur of Cooper |
| Elin | | Museum of Evolution | Camarasaurus Grandis | Late Jurassic (155-145 Mya) | Morrison Formation, Wyoming | Excavated in 2017 | |
| Elliot | | | Austrosaurus | Early Cretaceous (Albian) | Winton Formation, Queensland | Named after Dave Elliot | |
| ET | SMA 0002 | Sauriermuseum Aathal | Camarasaurus? Cathetosaurus lewisi? | Late Jurassic | Morrison Formation | | |
| Eva | | Dinosauria, Espéraza, Aude, France | Ampelosaurus atacis | Late Cretaceous (Maastrichtian; 70 Mya) | | Named after Eva Morvan, the student who first discovered it during the 2000–2001 excavations. | |
| George | | Eromanga Natural History Museum | Australotitan cooperensis | Cretaceous (Cenomanian-Turonian) | Winton Formation, Queensland | | |
| Lyle | | University of Kansas Natural History Museum | Camarasaurus | Late Jurassic | Morrison Formation, Wyoming | 50% complete | |
| Matilda | AODF 603 | Australian Age of Dinosaurs | Diamantinasaurus matildae | Late Cretaceous (Cenomanian-Turonian) | Winton Formation, Queensland | Found in 2005, excavated & named in 2009. Approximately 30% of the skeleton has been recovered. Named after Waltzing Matilda. | Matilda |
| Mary | | | Austrosaurus mckillopi | Early Cretaceous (Albian) | Winton Formation, Queensland | Named after Dr Mary Wade. | |
| Morris | | Wyoming Dinosaur Center | Camarasaurus | Late Jurassic | Morrison Formation (Beside Sauropod quarry) | | Morris |
| Ollie/Oliver | AODF 663 | | Diamantinasaurus matildae | Upper Cretaceous | Winton Formation, Queensland | | |
| Oskar | HMN SII | Natural History Museum, Berlin | Giraffatitan brancai | Late Jurassic | Tendaguru Formation | Formerly a species of Brachiosaurus | Oskar |
| Ralph | GPDM 220 | Great Plains Dinosaur Museum and Field Station | Camarasaurus sp. | Late Jurassic | Morrison Formation, Montana | Only known remains of the genus in Montana, as well as the northernmost occurrence | Skull of Ralph |
| Sid | | Eromanga Natural History Museum | Australotitan cooperensis | Late Cretaceous (Cenomanian; 95-98 Mya) | Winton Formation, Queensland | | |
| Tito | | Museo Civico di Storia Naturale di Milano (Milan Natural History Museum) | Titanosauria indet. | Early Cretaceous (Aptian; 112 Mya) | | Single tail vertebrae | |
| Tom | | Eromanga Natural History Museum | Australotitan cooperensis | Late Cretaceous (Cenomanian; 95-98 Mya) | Winton Formation, Queensland | | |
| Toni | SMA 0009 | Aathal Dinosaur Museum | Brachiosaurus altithorax | Late Jurassic | Morrison Formation, Wyoming | Juvenile specimen just 2 metres long. | |
| Wade | AODF 660 | Australian Age of Dinosaurs | Savannasaurus elliottorum | Late Cretaceous (Turonian) | Winton Formation (Ho-Hum site), Queensland | Holotype specimen. | Wade |
| Zac | | Eromanga Natural History Museum | Titanosauroformes | Late Cretaceous (Cenomanian; 95-98 Mya) | Winton Formation, Queensland | Very complete, articulated skeleton. Play on ANZAC and Anzac Day, on which fossils were uncovered | |

=== Theropods ===
==== Allosauroidea ====
| Nickname | Catalogue number | Institution | Taxon | Age | Unit | Notes | Images |
|---|---|---|---|---|---|---|---|
| Arkhane | | Brussels Museum of Natural Sciences | Allosaurus sp. nov. | Late Jurassic | | Possible new species | Arkhane |
| Big Al | MOR 693 | Museum of the Rockies | Allosaurus jimmadseni | Kimmeridgian | Morrison Formation | Almost complete specimen with multiple pathologies. | Big Al |
| Big Al 2 | SMA 0005 | Saurier Museum | Allosaurus jimmadseni | Late Jurassic | Morrison Formation | | Big Al 2, the Allosaurus |
| Big Joe | | Museum of Evolution, Knuthenborg Safaripark | Allosaurus jimmadseni | Late Jurassic (155 Mya) | | One of the largest & most complete Allosaurus specimens discovered to date | Big Joe |
| Big Sara | Privately owned | | Allosaurus | Late Jurassic | Morrison Formation | | Big Sara |
| Dracula | | | Allosaurus jimmadseni | Late Jurassic | Morrison Formation | | |
| Ebenezer | | Creation Museum | Allosaurus | Late Jurassic | Morrison Formation | | Ebenezer |
| Fran | NCSM 14345 | North Carolina Museum of Natural Sciences | Acrocanthosaurus atokensis | Early Cretaceous, Aptian | Antlers Formation | | NCSM 14345 |
| Jimmy | DINO 11541 | | Allosaurus jimmadseni | Late Jurassic | Morrison Formation | | Jimmy |
| Little Al | | | Allosaurus | Late Jurassic (Kimmeridgian; 155 Mya) | Morrison Formation | | |

==== Maniraptoromorpha ====
| Nickname | Catalogue number | Institution | Taxon | Age | Unit | Notes | Images |
|---|---|---|---|---|---|---|---|
| Baby Louie | HGM 41HIII1219 | Children's Museum of Indianapolis | Macroelongatoolithus carlylei/Beibeilong sinensis | Late Cretaceous (Maastrichtian) | Zoumagang Formation | Fossil eggs referred to Macroelongatoolithus, with an associated oviraptorosaur embryo. | |
| Baby Yingliang | YLSNHM01266 | Yingliang Stone Natural History Museum, Nan'an, China | Oviraptoridae indet. | Late Cretaceous (Maastrichtian) | Hekou Formation | Embryo. | |
| Big Auntie | IGM 100/1004 | Institute of Geology of Mongolia | Citipati osmolskae | Late Cretaceous (Campanian; 74 Mya) | Djadokhta Formation | | |
| Big Mama | IGM 100/979 | Institute of Geology of Mongolia | Citipati | Late Cretaceous (Campanian, 74 Mya) | Djadokhta Formation | | Big Mama |
| Borsti | JME Sch 200 | Jura-Museum Eichstatt | Juravenator starki | Late Jurassic (Kimmeridgian; 151 Mya) | Painten Formation | Holotype. Named after an expression for a bristle-haired dog. | |
| Ciro/Ambrogio | SBA-SA 163760 | Soprintendenza Archeologica di Salerno, Avellino, Benevento e Caserta (Benevento) | Scipionyx samniticus | Early Cretaceous (Albian; 113 Mya) | Pietraroja Plattenkalk | Holotype. Very well preserved, including internal organs. | |
| CLAWS | BHI 1266 | Black Hills Institute | Struthiomimus sedens | Late Cretaceous (Maastrichtian) | Lance Formation, Wyoming | | CLAWS the Struthiomimus |
| Daffy | TMP 1990.026.0001 | Royal Tyrrell Museum of Paleontology | Struthiomimus sp. | Late Cretaceous | Horseshoe Canyon formation | Named after the Looney Tunes character; Daffy Duck due to its skull shape. | |
| Dave | NGMC 91 | Geological Museum of China | Sinornithosaurus | Early Cretaceous (Barremian; 124.5 Mya) | Yixian Formation | | |
| Hector | | | Deinonychus antirrhopus | Early Cretaceous (Albian; 115-108 Mya) | Cloverly Formation, Montana | Named after the Trojan warrior Hector | |
| Ichabodcraniosaurus | IGM 100/980 | Institute of Geology of Mongolia | Shri devi | Late Cretaceous | Barun Goyot Formation | Named due to missing head | |
| Juliet | IGM 100 | Institute of Geology of Mongolia | Khaan mckennai | Late Cretaceous (Campanian to Maastrichtian; 75-71 Mya) | Djadochta Formation | | |
| Kirky | AM 6040 | Albany Museum | Nqwebasaurus thwazi | Early Cretaceous (Berriasian; 140 Mya) | Kirkwood Formation | Named after Kirkwood Formation where it was found. | |
| Lori | WDC DML 001 | Wyoming Dinosaur Center | Hesperornithoides miessleri | Late Jurassic | Jimbo Quarry, Morrison Formation | The first definitive troodont known from the Jurassic period. | |
| Pearl | | Burpee Museum of Natural History | Anzu wyliei | Late Cretaceous (Maastrichtian) | Hell Creek Formation | | |
| Romeo | | Institute of Geology of Mongolia | Khaan mckennai | Late Cretaceous (Campanian to Maastrichtian; 75-71 Mya) | Djadochta Formation | | |
| Sid Vicious | | Royal Ontario Museum | Dromaeosauridae indet. | Late Cretaceous (Campanian) | Judith River Formation, Montana | Nicknamed both "Julieraptor" and "Kleptoraptor" | Sid Vicious |
| Tweety | TMP 2009.110.0001 | Royal Tyrrell Museum of Palaeontology | Ornithomimus | Late Cretaceous (Early Maastrichtian) | Horseshoe Canyon formation | Juvenile specimen of Ornithomimus, named after the Looney Tunes character. | |
| The Phantom | SNSB BSPG VN-2010/1 | Museum of Evolution, Knuthenborg Safaripark | Archaeopteryx albersdoerferi | Late Jurassic (Tithonian; 150 Mya) | | Holotype of A. albersdoerferi. Also known as the "Daiting Specimen". | The Phantom/Daiting Specimen |

==== Tyrannosauroidea ====
| Nickname | Catalogue number | Institution | Taxon | Age | Unit | Notes | Images |
|---|---|---|---|---|---|---|---|
| Baby Bob/Son of Samson | private specimen, hence no catalogue number | private specimen, not kept in any institution | Tyrannosaurus | Late Cretaceous (Maastrichtian) | Hell Creek Formation, Montana | | |
| Barnum | private specimen, hence no catalogue number | private specimen, not kept in any institution | Tyrannosaurus rex | Late Cretaceous (Maastrichtian) | | Reported to potentially be the same individual as the first T. rex specimen ever discovered, now at the Natural History Museum, London. | |
| B-rex (Bob-rex) | MOR 1125 | Museum of the Rockies | Tyrannosaurus rex | Late Cretaceous (Maastrichtian) | Lower Hell Creek, Montana | Named after its discoverer, Bob Harmon. One of the few confirmed female fossils discovered. | |
| Belle | | | Tyrannosaurus rex | Late Cretaceous (Maastrichtian) | | | |
| Big Boy | | Arizona Museum of Natural History | Tyrannosauroidea sp. | Late Cretaceous (Campanian) | | | |
| Black Beauty / Cowley | TMP 1981.006.0001 | Royal Tyrrell Museum of Paleontology | Tyrannosaurus rex | Late Cretaceous (Maastrichtian) | Willow Creek formation, Alberta | | |
| Bloody Mary | NCSM 40000 | North Carolina Museum of Natural Sciences | Nanotyrannus lancensis | Late Cretaceous (Maastrichtian) | Hell Creek Formation | | |
| Blossom | TMP 2009.12.14 | Royal Tyrell Museum of Paleaotology | Gorgosaurus libratus | Late Cretaceous (Campanian) | Dinosaur Park formation | Its name is a combination of Bloss (the name of a local fossil hunter) and awesome. | CT scan of the lower jaw of Blossom |
| Bucky | TCM 2001.90.1 | Children's Museum of Indianapolis | Tyrannosaurus rex | Late Cretaceous (Maastrichtian) | Hell Creek Formation, South Dakota | Named after Bucky Derflinger who discovered it. | |
| Casper | | Statens Naturhistoriske Museum | Nanotyrannus or possibly Tyrannosaurus | Late Cretaceous (Maastrichtian) | | | |
| Chomper | MOR 6625 | Museum of the Rockies | Tyrannosaurus | Late Cretaceous (Maastrichtian) | | Juvenile skull, named for initial find of small lower jaw fragment. | |
| C-rex | MOR 1126 | Museum of the Rockies | Tyrannosaurus rex | Late Cretaceous (Maastrichtian) | | | |
| Cupcake | | | Tyrannosaurus | Late Cretaceous (Maastrichtian) | | | |
| Custer | MOR-008 | Museum of the Rockies | Tyrannosaurus | Late Cretaceous (Maastrichtian) | Hell Creek Formation | Has intact skull | Skull of Custer the T. rex |
| Denver's Tyranno | | Badlands Dinosaur Museum | Tyrannosaurid | Late Cretaceous | | | |
| Duffy | BHI 4100 | Black Hills Institute of Geological Research | Tyrannosaurus | Late Cretaceous (Maastrichtian 66 Mya) | Hell Creek Formation, South Dakota | Discovered in 1993 | Skull of Duffy the T. rex |
| Dunfy | TMP 1985.098.0001 | Royal Tyrrell Museum of Paleontology | Albertosaurus | Late Cretaceous (Maastrichtian) | | | |
| Dynamo | | | Tyrannosaurus | Late Cretaceous (Maastrichtian) | Hell Creek Formation | | |
| Elmer | FMNH PR 866 & PR 2211 (Now recognized as belonging to the same individual) | Field Museum of Natural History | Gorgosaurus | Late Cretaceous (Campanian) | Dinosaur Park: Quarry 138 | Partial skeleton of a 5-year-old tyrannosaurid. Discovered by Elmer S. Riggs in 1922. | Elmer |
| Fox | BHI 4182 | Black Hills Institute | Tyrannosaurus | Late Cretaceous (Maastrichtian) | | | Fox, BHI 4182, left dentary at the excavation, with Casey Smith |
| Ginny | | Royal Saskatchewan Museum | Tyrannosaurus rex | Late Cretaceous (Maastrichtian) | Frenchman formation | | |
| Gorgeous George | FMNH PR308 | Field Museum of Natural History | Daspletosaurus sp. | Late Cretaceous (Campanian) | Dinosaur Park Formation | Originally AMNH 5434, named after wrestler of same name. | The skeletal mount of "Gorgeous George |
| G-rex | MOR 1128 | Museum of the Rockies | Tyrannosaurus rex | Late Cretaceous (Maastrichtian) | Hell Creek Formation, Montana | | |
| Hager | MOR 008 | Museum of the Rockies | Tyrannosaurus rex | Late Cretaceous (Maastrichtian) | Hell Creek Formation | | |
| Hannibal | | | Gorgosaurus | Late Cretaceous (Campanian) | | | |
| Harley | | | Tyrannosaurus | Late Cretaceous (Maastrichtian) | | | |
| Huxley | TMP 1981.012.0001 | Royal Tyrrell Museum of Paleontology | Tyrannosaurus rex | Late Cretaceous (Maastrichtian) | Alberta | Named after the site where it was discovered. | |
| Ivan | | Museum of World Treasures | Tyrannosaurus | Late Cretaceous (Maastrichtian) | | | Ivan the T. rex |
| Jane | BMRP 2002.4.1 | Burpee Museum of Natural History | Nanotyrannus lethaeus | Late Cretaceous (Maastrichtian) | Hell Creek Formation, Montana | 11 y/o skeleton. Named after Burpee Museum benefactor Jane Solem. | Jane the T. rex |
| Jordan theropod | LACM 28471 | Natural History Museum of Los Angeles County | Eutyrannosauria indet. | Late Cretaceous (Maastrichtian) | Hell Creek Formation, Montana | Small juvenile specimen, two years old, named after where it was found: Jordan, Montana | Jordan theropod |
| Laurel | | | Tyrannosaurus rex | Late Cretaceous (Maastrichtian) | | Juvenile specimen | |
| Lee-rex | | Tate Geological Museum | Tyrannosaurus rex | Late Cretaceous (Maastrichtian) | | | Lee Rex |
| Little Clint | | Carthage College Institute of Paleontology/Dinosaur Discovery Museum | Tyrannosaurus | Late Cretaceous (Maastrichtian) | | | |
| Lucy | | University of Kansas Natural History Museum | Tyrannosaurus | Late Cretaceous (Maastrichtian) | Montana | | |
| Mr. Daspleto | | Royal Tyrell Museum of Paleaotology | Daspletosaurus sp. | Late Cretaceous (Campanian) | | Initially labelled "MR Daspleto" (Milk River Daspelto) which was misread as "Mr. Daspleto", resulting in its nickname. | Mr. Daspleto |
| Ouroboros / Boris / Hollywood | | Utah Natural History Museum | Teratophoneus | Late Cretaceous (Campanian) | | Named after how the tail was found very close to mouth, in reference to the mythical serpent. | |
| Peck's Rex / Rigby's Rex / Montana's Rex | MOR 980 | Museum of the Rockies | Tyrannosaurus rex | Late Cretaceous (Maastrichtian 68-66 Mya) | Hell Creek Formation | Named after Fort Peck which it was discovered close to. | |
| Pete III | | Cincinnati Museum Center | Daspletosaurus torosus | Late Cretaceous (Campanian) | | | |
| Peter | AWMM-IL 2022.9 | Auckland War Memorial Museum | Tyrannosaurus rex | Late Cretaceous (Maastrichtian) | Lance Formation, Wyoming | | |
| Petey | | | Tyrannosaurus | Late Cretaceous (Maastrichtian) | | | |
| Queenie | | | Tyrannosaurus | Late Cretaceous (Maastrichtian) | | | |
| Regina | | | Tyrannosaurus | Late Cretaceous (Maastrichtian) | | | |
| Rex Jr. | UCRC PV1 | University of Chicago Research Collection | Tyrannosaurus rex | Late Cretaceous (Maastrichtian; 69–66 Mya) | Lance Formation, Wyoming | Partial torso. Collected in 2000 | |
| Ruth | | Museum of Ancient Life | Gorgosaurus | Late Cretaceous (Campanian) | | | Ruth the Gorgosaurus |
| Samson / Z-rex | | | Tyrannosaurus rex | Late Cretaceous (Maastrichtian) | South Dakota | | Samson the T. rex |
| Scotty | RSM P2523.8 | Royal Saskatchewan Museum | Tyrannosaurus rex | Late Cretaceous (Maastrichtian) | Frenchman formation, Saskatchewan | Named for the celebratory bottle of scotch shared by the team that had discovered and identified the bones. | Scotty the T. rex |
| Sir Williams | | | Daspletosaurus sp. | Late Cretaceous (Campanian) | | Possibly either Daspletosaurus, or a new genus. | |
| Sisyphus | | Dakota Dinosaur Museum at Dickinson Museum Center | Daspletosaurus wilsoni | Late Cretaceous (Campanian) | | | Sisyphus |
| Stan | BHI 3033 | Black Hills Institute | Tyrannosaurus rex | Late Cretaceous (Maastrichtian) | Hell Creek Formation, South Dakota | Named after Stan Sacrison, the amateur Paleontologist who discovered it. | Stan the T. rex |
| Sue | FMNH PR 2081 | Field Museum of Natural History | Tyrannosaurus rex | Late Cretaceous (Maastrichtian) | Hell Creek Formation, South Dakota | 90% complete by volume. Named for discoverer Susan Hendrickson. | Sue the T. rex |
| Tara | | Palm Beach Museum of Natural History | Tyrannosaurus | Late Cretaceous (Maastrichtian) | | | |
| Tinker | | The Journey Museum and Learning Center | Tyrannosaurus | Late Cretaceous (Maastrichtian) | South Dakota | Most complete juvenile T. rex skeleton found to date. Found in 1998. | Tinker the T. rex |
| Thanatos | TMP 2010.5.7 | Royal Tyrrell Museum of Palaeontology | Thanatotheristes degrootorum | Late Cretaceous (Campanian) | Foremost Formation | Named after the Greek god of death | |
| Thomas | LACM 150167 | Natural History Museum of Los Angeles County | Tyrannosaurus rex | Late Cretaceous (Maastrichtian) | Hell Creek Formation, Montana | Named after the brother of school teacher Robert Curry, who discovered the fossil | Thomas the T. rex |
| Titus | Private specimen | | Tyrannosaurus rex | Late Cretaceous (Maastrichtian) | Hell Creek Formation, Montana | Found in 2018. | Titus the T. rex |
| Trinity | | Museum of Evolution, Knuthenborg Safaripark | Tyrannosaurus rex | Late Cretaceous (Maastrichtian) | | A composite of three different individuals. | |
| Tristan-Otto | MB.R.91216 | Natural History Museum, Berlin | Tyrannosaurus rex | Late Cretaceous (Maastrichtian) | Hell Creek Formation, Montana | Named after Tristan and Otto, the sons of a Danish-born investment banker, Niels Nielsen. | Tristan the T. rex |
| Trix | RGM 792.000 | Naturalis Biodiversity Center | Tyrannosaurus rex | Late Cretaceous (Maastrichtian) | Hell Creek Formation, Montana | Named after Dutch princess Beatrix | Trix the T. rex |
| Tufts Love | UWBM 99000 | Burke Museum of Natural History and Culture | Tyrannosaurus rex | Late Cretaceous (Maastrichtian) | Hell Creek Formation, Montana | Named after two Burke Museum volunteers which discovered this specimen: Jason Love and Luke Tufts. | |
| Victoria | | | Tyrannosaurus rex | Late Cretaceous (Maastrichtian) | | | |
| Wankel Rex | USNM PAL 555000 (formerly MOR 555) | National Museum of Natural History | Tyrannosaurus rex | Late Cretaceous (Maastrichtian) | Hell Creek Formation | | Big Mike/Devil Rex/Wankel Rex |
| Wyrex | | Houston Museum of Natural Science | Tyrannosaurus rex | Late Cretaceous (Maastrichtian) | Hell Creek Formation | | |
| Zuri | HRS08438, 8507, 8470, 1508, and other | Southwestern Adventist University | Nanotyrannus or possibly Tyrannosaurus | Late Cretaceous (Maastrichtian) | Hell Creek Formation | | |

==== Misc. Theropods ====
| Nickname | Catalogue number | Institution | Taxon | Age | Unit | Notes | Images |
|---|---|---|---|---|---|---|---|
| Banjo | AODF 604 | Australian Age of Dinosaurs | Australovenator wintonensis | Late Cretaceous (Cenomanian; 95 Mya) | Winton Formation | Named after Banjo Patterson | |
| Claws | NHMUK VP R9951 (formerly BMNH R9951) | Natural History Museum, London | Baryonyx walkeri | Early Cretaceous (Barremian; 130–125 Mya) | Weald Clay Formation | Named for its large hand claws, pun on the book and movie Jaws | |
| Gertie | PEFO 10395 | Petrified Forest National Park | Chindesaurus bryansmalli | Late Triassic (Norian; 213-201 Mya) | Chinle Formation (Upper Petrified Forest Member) | Holotype. Named after Gertie the Dinosaur | |
| Elvis | | | Torvosaurus tanneri | Late Jurassic | Morrison Formation, Colorado | | |

== See also ==
- Lists of dinosaur specimens
- List of dinosaur specimens sold at auction
- Specimens of Tyrannosaurus

== Bibliography ==
- Pasch, A. D.; May, K. C. (2001), "First occurrence of a Hadrosaur (Dinosauria) from the Matanuska Formation (Turonian) in the Talkeetna Mountains of south-central Alaska", Short notes on Alaska geology 1997, Alaska Division of Geological & Geophysical Surveys, pp. 99–109, doi:10.14509/2335
