= List of non-dinosaur fossil specimens with nicknames =

This list of nicknamed non-dinosaur fossils is a list of non-dinosaurian fossil specimens given informal names or nicknames, in addition to their institutional catalogue numbers. It excludes informal appellations that are purely descriptive (e.g., "the Fighting Dinosaurs", "the Trachodon Mummy").

For a list of dinosaur fossil specimens, see List of dinosaur specimens with nicknames.

== Synapsids ==
=== Mammals ===
==== Atlantogenata ====
Nickname	Catalogue number	Institution	Taxon	Age	Unit	Notes	Images
Archie		University of Nebraska State Museum	Columbian Mammoth (Mammuthus columbi)	Pleistocene			Archi the Mammoth
Benny		Trailside Museum of Natural History	Columbian Mammoth (Mammuthus columbi)	Pleistocene		Specimen died in an intraspecific fight with another of the same species, "George". Named after land surveyors Ben Ferguson and George McMillan	
Dima			Woolly Mammoth (Mammuthus primigenius)	Middle Pleistocene – Late Holocene			
Fred		Science Central	American Mastodon	Late Miocene – early Holocene			
George		Trailside Museum of Natural History	Columbian Mammoth (Mammuthus columbi)	Pleistocene		Specimen died in an intraspecific fight with another of the same species, "Benny". Named after land surveyors Ben Ferguson and George McMillan	
Linda		City Museum of Bad Vöslau	Metaxytherium medium	Badenian			
Little Stevie		Western Science Center					
Lyuba			Woolly Mammoth (Mammuthus primigenius)	Late Pleistocene (42 Ka)		Female calf. Discovered in 2007.	
Mascha			Woolly Mammoth (Mammuthus primigenius)	Middle Pleistocene – Late Holocene			
Max		Western Science Center	Pacific Mastodon (Mammut pacificus)	Late Miocene – early Holocene			
Megajeff			Megalonyx	Pliocene-Late Pleistocene			
Mylo		Western Science Center	Harlan's Ground Sloth (Paramylodon harlani)	Pliocene–Late Pleistocene			
Sasha			Woolly Mammoth (Mammuthus primigenius)	Middle Pleistocene – Late Holocene			
Xena		Western Science Center	Columbian Mammoth (Mammuthus columbi)	Pleistocene			
Yuka			Woolly Mammoth (Mammuthus primigenius)	Middle Pleistocene – Late Holocene		Male calf. Discovered in 2010.	Yuka
Zed			Columbian Mammoth (Mammuthus columbi)	Pleistocene			

=== Carnivorans ===
Nickname	Catalogue number	Institution	Taxon	Age	Unit	Notes	Image
Boris			Cave Lion (Panthera spelaea)	Late Pleistocene (44 Ka)		Two to Three-weeks old cub, died due to the collapse of a cave.	(b) male Boris
Dogor			Wolf	Late Pleistocene (18 Ka)		Male puppy, Discovered in 2018. Named for the Yakut word for friend.	Dogor
Sparta			Cave Lion (Panthera spelaea)	Late Pleistocene (26 Ka)		Female cub, died of starvation.	(a, e, f) female Sparta
Tumat		Centre for Palaeogenetics	yet to be determined	Late Pleistocene (14 Ka)		Found in Russia nearly 10 years ago, it is a puppy that also contained a piece of Woolly Rhino skin in its belly.	
Waldo	OCPC 11141	Orange County Paleontology Collection	Titanotaria orangensis	Late Miocene (6.6-5.8 Mya)	Capistrano Formation	one of the last and best known tuskless walrus	Waldo in dorsal view

==== Primates ====
Nickname	Catalogue number	Institution	Taxon	Age	Unit	Notes	Image
Alesi	KNM-NP 59050	National Museums of Kenya	Nyanzapithecus alesi	13 Mya	Lake Turkana	An infantile cranium.	
Ardi	ARA-VP-6/500	National Museums of Kenya	Ardipithecus ramidus	4.4 Mya	Aramis	A partial skeleton, possibly a female.	
The Black Skull	KNM-WT 17000	National Museums of Kenya	Paranthropus aethiopicus	2.5 Mya	Nachukui Formation	A cranium.	
Dear Boy, Zinj	OH 5		Paranthropus boisei	1.8 Mya	Olduvai Gorge	A cranium and mandible.	
Flo, Little Lady of Flores, Hobbit	LB-1		Homo floresiensis	50 Ka	Liang Bua	A partial skeleton, including a cranium and mandible.	
Ida	PMO 214.214 (Slab A)	American Museum of Natural History	Darwinius masillae	47 Mya	Messel Pit	Two slabs, A and B, comprising a nearly complete individual with part and counterpart.	
Devil's Tower Child, Abel	Gibraltar 2		Homo neanderthalensis	42 Ka	Devil's Tower	Five cranial fragments belonging to a young boy.	
Laia	IPS58443		Pliobates cataloniae	11.6 Mya		Partial skeleton.	
Lucy, Dinkinesh, Heelomali	AL 288-1		Australopithecus afarensis	3.2 Mya	Hadar	A partial skeleton including cranial fragments.	
Mrs. Ples	Sts 5	Ditsong National Museum of Natural History	Australopithecus africanus	2.1-2.6 Mya	Sterkfontein	A cranium.	
Red Lady of Paviland	None	Various	Homo sapiens	33 Ka	Paviland Cave	A partial skeleton of a man.	
Taung Child, Taung Baby	Taung 1	Wits University	Australopithecus	2.8 Mya	Taung	A partial cranium and mandible.	
Turkana Boy, Nariokotome Boy	KNM-WT 15000	National Museums of Kenya	Homo erectus	1.5 Mya	Nachukui Formation	One of the most complete hominin skeletons.	
Nandy	Shanidar 1		Homo neanderthalensis	45-35 Ka	Shanidar Cave	A set of skeletal remains including a skull.	
The Old Man	La Chapelle-aux-Saints 1		Homo neanderthalensis	60 Ka	La Chapelle-aux-Saints	A skeleton.	
Egbert	Ksar Akil 1	National Museum of Beirut	Homo sapiens	40-38 Ka	Ksar Akil	A juvenile skeleton.	
Ethelruda	Ksar Akil 2	National Museum of Beirut	Homo sapiens	42-41 Ka	Ksar Akil	A maxilla.	
The Young Prince	Arene Candide 1	Various	Homo sapiens	23 Ka	Arene Candide	A skeleton of a teenager.	
Jonny's Child	OH 7		Homo habilis	1.75 Mya	Olduvai Gorge	A mandible, the holotype.	
Pinhead	OH 12		Homo erectus		Olduvai Gorge	A partial cranium.	
Cinderella (Cindy)	OH 13		Homo habilis		Olduvai Gorge	A partial cranium and mandible.	
Olduvai George (George)	OH 16		Homo habilis	1.7 Mya	Olduvai Gorge	A partial neurocranium.	
Twiggy	OH 24		Homo habilis	1.8 Mya	Olduvai Gorge	A cranium.	
Selam, Dikika infant/baby/child, Lucy's Baby	DIK-1/1	National Museum, Addis Ababa	Australopithecus afarensis	3.3 Mya	Dikika	An infantile skeleton including cranium and mandible.	
Samuel/Samu	Vsz II	Hungarian National Museum	Homo heidelbergensis?	325-340 Ka	Vertesszolos	A fragmentary cranium	
Mystery Skull	KNM-ER 1805	National Museums of Kenya	Homo habilis	1.74 Mya	Kariri Ridge	A cranium.	
The First Family	AL 333		Australopithecus afarensis	3.2 Mya	Hadar	Various skeletal elements.	
Moshe	KMH2		Homo neanderthalensis	60 Ka	Kebara Cave	A skeleton including cranium.	
Agamenón	SH 4		Homo neanderthalensis	430 Ka	Sima de los Huesos	A cranium.	
Miguelón	SH 5		Homo neanderthalensis	430 Ka	Sima de los Huesos	A cranium and mandible.	
Benjamina	SH 14		Homo neanderthalensis	430 Ka	Sima de los Huesos	An infantile cranium.	
Little Foot	StW 573		Australopithecus africanus	3.67 Mya	Sterkfontein	A skeleton.	
Elvis	Pelvis 1		Homo neanderthalensis		Sima de los Huesos	A pelvis.	
Eurydice	DNH-7		Paranthropus robustus	2.04-1.95 Mya	Drimolen	A cranium and mandible.	
Orpheus	DNH-8		Paranthropus robustus		Drimolen	A mandible.	
Khethi	DNH 152		Paranthropus robustus	2.04–1.95 Mya	Drimolen		
Simon	DNH 134		Homo erectus	2 Mya	Drimolen	A neurocranium.	
Abel	KT12/H1		Australopithecus bahrelghazali	3.5 Mya	Koro Toro	A mandible.	
Toumaï	TM 266-01-060-1		Sahelanthropus tchadensis	7-6 Mya	Djurab Desert	A cranium and limb bone	
Kadanuumuu, Big Man	KSD-VP-1/1		Australopithecus afarensis	3.58 Mya			
Karabo	MH1	Wits University	Australopithecus sediba	1.8 Mya	Malapa Cave	A partial skeleton.	
Issa	MH2	Wits University	Australopithecus sediba	1.8 Mya	Malapa Cave	A partial skeleton.	
X-woman	Denisova 3		Denisovan	76.2–51.6 Ka	Denisova Cave	A finger bone.	
Denny	Denisova 11		Denisovan x Neanderthal	118.1–79.3 Ka	Denisova Cave	Limb fragments.	
Neo	NES1		Homo naledi	300 Ka	Lesedi Chamber	A cranium and mandible.	Skull of Neo
Mal'ta Boy	MA-1		Homo sapiens	24 Ka	Mal'ta	Skeleton.	
Mtoto	Panga ya Saidi		Homo sapiens	78 Ka	Panga ya Saidi	Skeleton, a burial.	
Vera	Prado Vargas 1360		Homo neanderthalensis	54.7-39.8 Ka	Prado Vargas		
Pàus	St.n.166623		Homo neanderthalensis				
La Dame du Cavillon	Barma del Caviglione 1		Homo sapiens	24 Ka	Cavillon Cave	Skeleton, a burial.	
Ötzi the Iceman		South Tyrol Museum of Archaeology	Homo sapiens	3300 BCE	Ötztal Alps	A mummified body.	
Luzia	Lapa Vermelha IV Hominid 1		Homo sapiens	11.5 Ka	Lapa Vermelha	A fragmentary skeleton.	
Naia	HN5/48		Homo sapiens	13-12 Ka	Hoyo Negro	A skeleton.	
Kwäday Dän Ts'ìnchi	None		Homo sapiens	550–300 years	Tatshenshini-Alsek Provincial Park	A mummified body.	
Anzick Boy	Anzick-1		Homo sapiens	13-12.85 Ka	Near Wilsall	A skeleton.	
Leanderthal Lady			Homo sapiens	13-10 Ka	Wilson-Leonard Brushy Creek Site	A skeleton.	
El Graeco			Graecopithecus freybergi	7.2 Mya	Pyrgos Vasilissis	Dental-mandibular remains.	
Madam Buya	Buia UA 31		Homo erectus	1 Mya	Afar	A cranium.	
Eve	Qazeh 9		Homo sapiens	100–90 Ka	Qafzeh Cave	A cranium.	
Besséʼ			Homo sapiens	7200 years	Leang Panninge cave	A skeleton.	
Roger	Boxgrove 1		Homo heidelbergensis	500 Ka	Boxgrove	Limb and dental fragments.	
Pau	IPS21350		Pierolapithecus catalaunicus	12.5-13 Mya	Barranc de Can Vila-1 site	A skeleton.	

==== Ungulates ====
Nickname	Catalogue number	Institution	Taxon	Age	Unit	Notes	Image
Blue Babe		University of Alaska Museum	Steppe Bison (Bison priscus)	Pleistocene (36 Ka)	Alaska	Named after the bluish color of the specimen	Blue Babe frozen mummy
Sasha		Yakutian Academy of Sciences	Coelodonta antiquitatis	Pleistocene	Siberia	Partial mummy of a baby.	
Thor			Megacerops	Middle Eocene			

=== Pelycosaurs ===
Nickname	Catalogue number	Institution	Taxon	Age	Unit	Notes	Images
Abby		Whiteside Museum of Natural History	Dimetrodon	Permian	Seymour, Texas		
Bonnie		Whiteside Museum of Natural History	Dimetrodon	Permian	Seymour, Texas Kennesaw Bone Bed	Discovered in 2016. Fairly complete skeleton.	
Guillory		Whiteside Museum of Natural History	Dimetrodon	Permian	Seymour, Texas	Possibly scavenged by other Dimetrodon	
Leidy	ANSP 9524	Academy of Natural Sciences of Drexel University (on loan to Royal Ontario Museum)	Dimetrodon borealis	Early Permian, 270 Mya (Artinskian)	Orby Head Formation, Prince Edward Island	Holotype specimen. Named after Joseph Leidy, the original describer of the specimen	Leidy
Laslow		Houston Museum of Natural Science	Dimetrodon loomisi	Permian			Laslow
Michael		Whiteside Museum of Natural History	Dimetrodon	Permian	Seymour, Texas	Heavily scavenged	

== Reptiles ==
=== Lepidosauria ===
Nickname	Catalogue number	Institution	Taxon	Age	Unit	Notes	Images
Bèr	NHMM 1998141	Maastricht Natural History Museum	Prognathodon saturator	Late Cretaceous (Maastrichtian)	ENCI quarry	Holotype specimen.	Bèr the Prognathodon
Bob			Tylosaurus	Late Cretaceous			
Bruce		Canadian Fossil Discovery Centre	Tylosaurus pembinensis	Late Cretaceous			Bruce the Tylosaurus
Brutus		Royal Tyrell Museum of Paleaotology	Prognathodon overtoni	Late Cretaceous	Korite Ammolite mine, Bearpaw Formation	Named Brutus to describe the Burly nature of its anatomy.	
Bunker	KUVP 5033	University of Kansas Natural History Museum	Tylosaurus rex	Late Cretaceous	Niobrara Formation		Bunker the Tylosaurus
Cap'n Chuck		Shanghai	Platecarpus	Late Cretaceous	Niobrara	Excavated in 2007	
Carlo		Maastricht Natural History Museum	Prognathodon	Late Cretaceous (Early Maastrichtian)	Gulpen Formation, Lixhe 3 Member	Found in 2012. Named after finder Carlo Brauer	Carlo
Eustace	NDGS 10838	North Dakota Heritage Center	Jormungandr walhallaensis	Late Cretaceous (Middle Campanian)	Pierre Shale Formation, Pembina Member	Holotype specimen named after the character Eustace Bagge from the animated show Courage the Cowardly Dog.	Eustace the Jormungandr
Kristine	NHMM 2012073	Maastricht Natural History Museum	Plioplatecarpus marshi	Late Cretaceous (Maastrichtian)	Maastricht Formation, Meerssen Member (ENCI quarry)	Named after the finder Kristine Mariën.	Kristine the Plioplatecarpus
Lars		Maastricht Natural History Museum	Mosasaurus hoffmanni	Late Cretaceous (Maastrichtian)	ENCI quarry	Found in 2014 by Lars Barten and his father, after whom the specimen was then nicknamed.	
Max			Tylosaurus	Late Cretaceous			
Mister Sinister	TMP 2008.036.0001	Royal Tyrell Museum of Paleaotology	Mosasaurus missouriensis	Late Cretaceous (Late Campanian)	Bearpaw Formation	A Juvenile, named after the comic book character Mister Sinister, in reference to its grin.	Mister Sinister the Mosasaurus
Nolan			Tylosaurus	Late Cretaceous	Niobrara		
Omācīw			Tylosaurus saketchewanensis	Late Cretaceous			
Sophie			Tylosaurus	Late Cretaceous			
Suzy		Canadian Fossil Discovery Centre	Tylosaurus	Late Cretaceous			
Winnie			Plioplatecarpus	Late Cretaceous			

=== Pseudosuchians ===
Nickname	Catalogue number	Institution	Taxon	Age	Unit	Notes	Images
Big Bert	SMNH P2411.1	Royal Saskatchewan Museum	Terminonaris robusta	Late Cretaceous (Turonian)	Favel Formation	Most complete specimen of the genus	Skeletal diagram of Big Bert
Black Sun	THOR16_100BS		Crocodylus anthropophagus	Pleistocene	Olduvai Gorge	Named due to the fact that it was discovered during an annual solar eclipse on September 1, 2016	
Edgar	NHMUK P9/3a	Natural History Museum, London	Aenigmaspina pantyffynnonensis	Late Triassic (Rhaetian)			
Mo			Terminonaris ponteixensis	Late Cretaceous			
Scarface	LPRP 0697	Laboratório de Paleontologia de Ribeirão Preto	Aphaurosuchus escharafacies	Late Cretaceous (Coniacian-Campanian)	Bauru Group of Vale do Rio do Peixe Formation	A cut on the left jugal and dentary made by the rock saw during the collection of the specimen, promptly gave the fossil its nickname "Scarface."	

=== Pterosauria ===
Nickname	Catalogue number	Institution	Taxon	Age	Unit	Notes	Images
Butch	AODF 876	Australian Age of Dinosaurs	Ferrodraco	Late Cretaceous (Cenomanian)	Winton Formation	Holotype of Ferrodraco	
Darkwing	JME SOS 4784		Rhamphorhynchus muensteri	Late Jurassic (Tithonian)	Eichstätt region	Discovered in 2001	
Dracula			undescribed azhdarchid	Cretaceous			
Ian			undescribed wukongopterid	Jurassic			
Joey	BMR P2002.2	Burpee Museum of Natural History	Infernodrakon hastacollis	Late Cretaceous (Maastrichtian)	Hell Creek formation	Holotype. Named after singer Joey Ramone	
Mrs. T	ZMNH M8802	Zhejiang Museum of Natural History	Darwinopterus	Middle Jurassic		Found with a preserved egg between the legs.	

=== Sauropterygia ===
Nickname	Catalogue number	Institution	Taxon	Age	Unit	Notes	Images
Albert		Royal Tyrrell Museum of Palaeontology	possibly Albertonectes	Late Cretaceous	Bearpaw Formation	Named after Albertonectes, because it might possibly belong to that genus.	
Britney			Ophthalmothule	Tithonian-Berriasian			
Doris		Bristol Museum	Pliosaurus carpenteri	Late Jurassic (Kimmeridgian, 150 Mya)		Found in 1994	
Harold	GPM 5001	Paleon Museum	Serpentisuchops pfisterae	Late Cretaceous, (Lower Maastrichtian)	Pierre Shale		
Ichabod	TMP 2007.011.0001	Royal Tyrell Museum of Paleaotology	Albertonectes vanderveldei	Late Cretaceous (Late Campanian)	Bearpaw Formation	Named after Ichabod Crane from the Legend of the Sleepy Hollow, in reference to the specimen's missing skull.	
Sea-Rex		The Etches Collection	Undescribed pliosaur	Late Jurassic (Kimmeridgian, 150 Mya)	Kimmeridge clay	Very complete skull	

=== Misc Reptiles ===
Nickname	Catalogue number	Institution	Taxon	Age	Unit	Notes	Images
Bernie			Thalattosaur	Triassic	Oregon	Discovered in 2011. Named after Gene and Marian Bernard	
Brigitta	NHMW-GEO-1977/1902/0001	Natural History Museum, Vienna	Archelon	Late Cretaceous (Campanian)	Pierre Shale	largest known Archelon specimen and second largest individual turtle fossil after specimen CIAAP-2002-01 of Stupendemys geographica.	
Delilah	SAM-PK-K10036		Pareiasaurus serridens	Permian	Karoo basin, South Africa		
Jim 2	LACM DI 157871	Natural History Museum of Los Angeles County	Cymbospondylus youngorum	Middle Triassic (Anisian)	Favret Formation	holotype and the largest known member of the genus with a skull length of almost 2 meter.	
Leona		Fukui Dinosaur Museum	Champsosaurus sp.	Campanian–Paleocene		Adult specimen.	
Oldie / Gamla			Keilhauia nui	Early Cretaceous (Berriasian)			
Wilma		Royal Ontario Museum	Champsosaurus sp.	Campanian–Paleocene			

== Fish ==
Nickname	Catalogue number	Institution	Taxon	Age	Unit	Notes	Images
Carl			Xiphactinus	Late Cretaceous		Found by Cassi Knight in 2021	
Dave	S.7502.06	Canadian Fossil Discovery Centre	Lamniform shark	Campanian, Late Cretaceous		A fairly complete skeleton	

== See also ==
- Lists of animal specimens
- Lists of fossils
- Lists of nicknames
