= Burp (disambiguation) =

Burp or BURP may refer to:

- Burping, release of gas from the digestive tract through the mouth (often referred as a belch)
- Big and Ugly Rendering Project, volunteer computing project using BOINC
- BURP domain, group of amino acid proteins
- Burp suite, computer security application
- Harry Hill's TV Burp, British television comedy programme
- TV Burp (Australian TV series), Australian television comedy program
- Basic Using Reverse Polish, programming language used on the PSI Comp 80 computer
- brioche-purl stitch, a kind of stitch in brioche knitting
- "Burp, the Smelly Alien", a comic strip by Jeremy Banks in Oink!.

== See also ==
- GCRT J1745-3009, astronomical object nicknamed a burper
- Burpee (disambiguation)
- Burp gun, see submachine gun
