= Burpee =

Burpee may refer to:

- Burpee (exercise), a full body exercise
- Burpee Seeds, a seed company
- Hanksville-Burpee Quarry, a paleontological excavation site near Hanksville, Utah
- Burpee Museum of Natural History
- Burpee and Mills, Ontario, a township

It is also a name:

- Washington Atlee Burpee, founder of Burpee Seeds
- Lawrence Johnstone Burpee (1873–1946), Canadian librarian, historian and author
- Judson Burpee Black (1842–1924), Canadian politician
- Lucien F. Burpee (1855–1924), American soldier, lawyer, and judge
- Burpee L. Steeves (1868–1933), Lieutenant Governor of Idaho from 1905 to 1907
