= Great Plains Dinosaur Museum and Field Station =

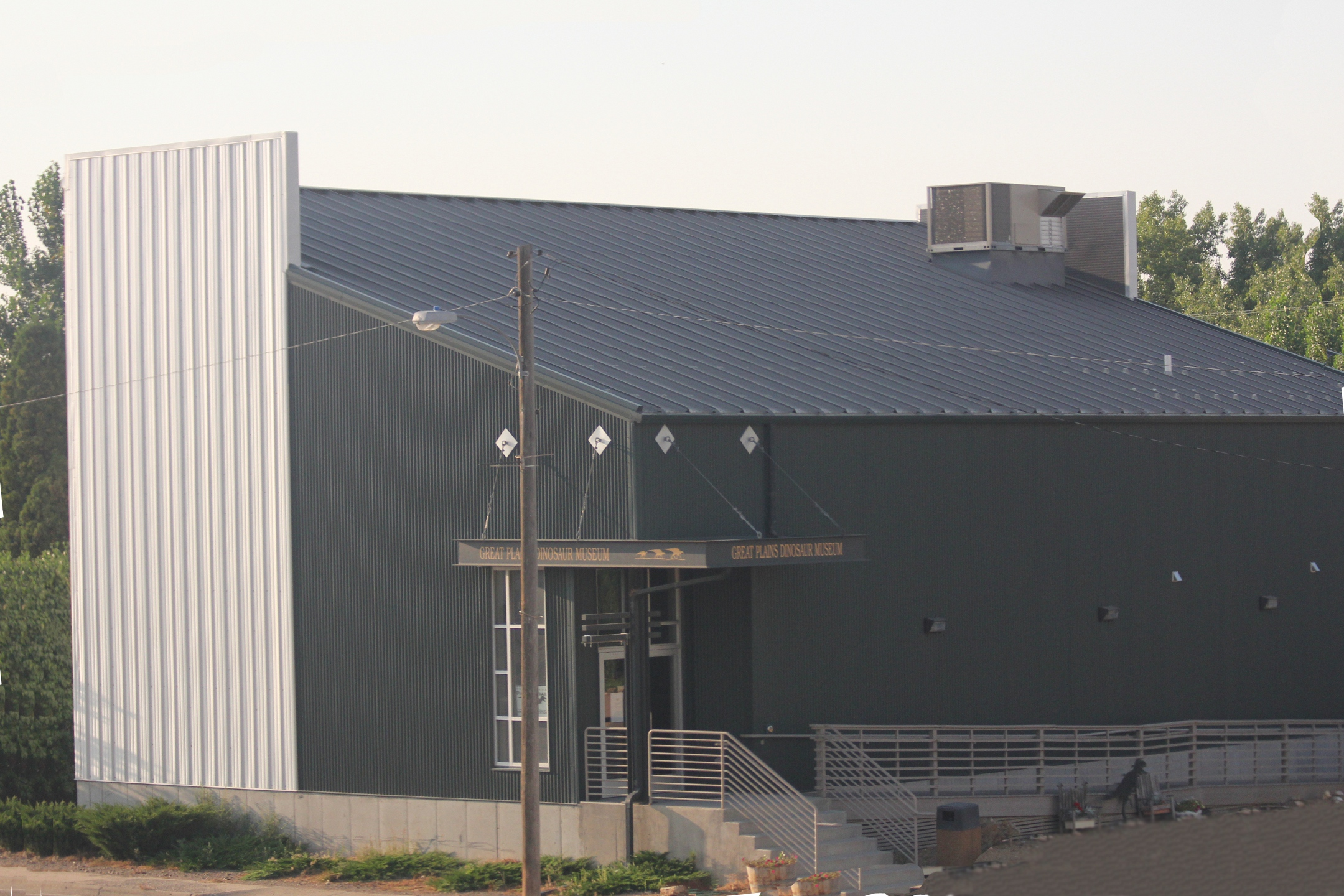
- Established: 2008
- Location: 405 N 1st St E, Malta, Montana
- Coordinates: 48.3606°N 107.8679°W
- Type: Natural history museum
- Website: www.greatplainsdinosaurs.org

The Great Plains Dinosaur Museum and Field Station is a paleontology museum located in Malta, Montana. Opened in 2008, the museum features exhibits of dinosaurs and other prehistoric fossils that were found in the area and state, including a Triceratops, Stegosaurus, sauropod, and hadrosaurs. The museum includes a fossil preparation lab and hosts dig trips. It is open seasonally.

The museum is a member of the Montana Dinosaur Trail.
