= Naranjo Museum of Natural History =

Museum in Lufkin, Texas

Coordinates: 31.2685°N 94.7421°W

The Naranjo Museum of Natural History is a museum located in Lufkin, Texas.

== Background ==
The museum was founded by Neal Naranjo, a doctor of neuropsychology. Naranjo has been a collector of fossils from a young age, and in 2006 he began showing his large collection of fossils to students in the Lufkin area and in 2012 they established a permanent, ten thousand square foot location. The museum, which drew one hundred thousand visitors in its first full year of operation, serves as a permanent location to display his collection, the highlight of which is a hadrosaur.

The artifacts range from pre-historic to modern and include five dinosaur eggs thought to be more than sixty million years old as well as a replica T-Rex sourced from the Hell Creek Formation that the museum named Bubba Rex. It is the only tyrannosaurus in East Texas.
