= Maastricht Natural History Museum =

- Natuurhistorisch Museum Maastricht
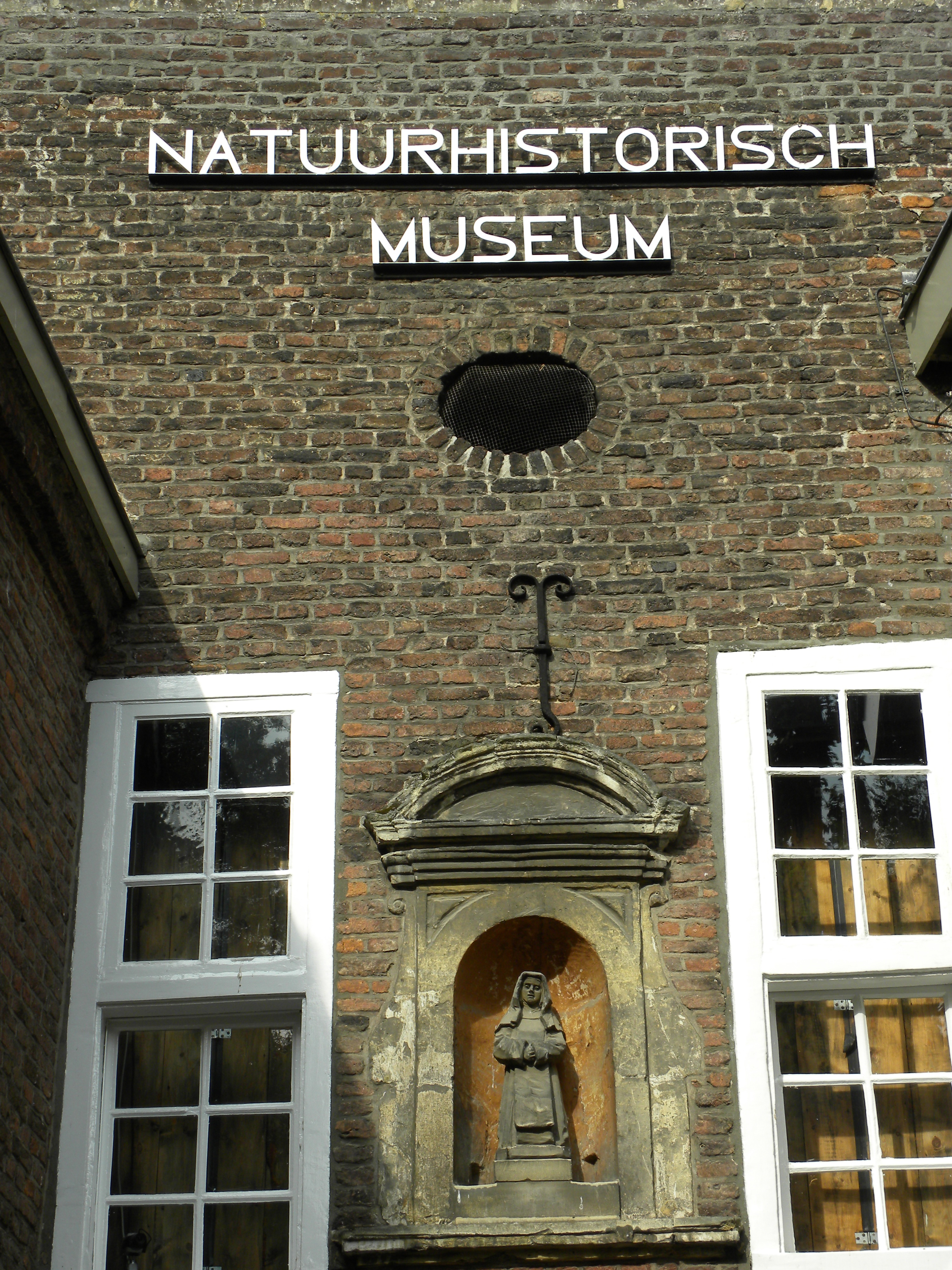
- Front of the museum in 2010
- Location: De Bosquetplein 7 Maastricht, Netherlands
- Coordinates: 50.8449°N 5.6878°E
- Type: Natural history museum
- Visitors: 28,614 (2013)
- Director: Stef Niekamp
- Website: nhmmaastricht.nl

Maastricht Natural History Museum (Dutch: Natuurhistorisch Museum Maastricht) is a museum of natural history in Maastricht, Netherlands. The museum is located in a former monastery called Grauwzustersklooster (English: Monastery of the Grey Sisters) in the historic district Jekerkwartier in the centre of Maastricht.

The collection is dedicated to the geology, paleontology, flora and fauna of South Limburg. Highlights from the collection are Cretaceous fossils from Sint-Pietersberg, most notably the skull of a Mosasaur (nicknamed "Bèr") and specimens of Hoffmann's giant turtle, Allopleuron hofmanni and Suyckerbuyk's turtle, Glyptochelone suyckerbuyki.

A significant mosasaurus skull was taken by the French during the Siege of Maastricht, and has been housed at the French National Museum of Natural History since 1794. Multiple attempts have been made since 1824 to have the piece returned to Maastricht.

The museum also has a period room with cabinets of curiosities. A remarkable piece from that collection is a rat king from the 19th century.

Behind the museum is a botanical garden, situated on the banks of the small river Jeker.

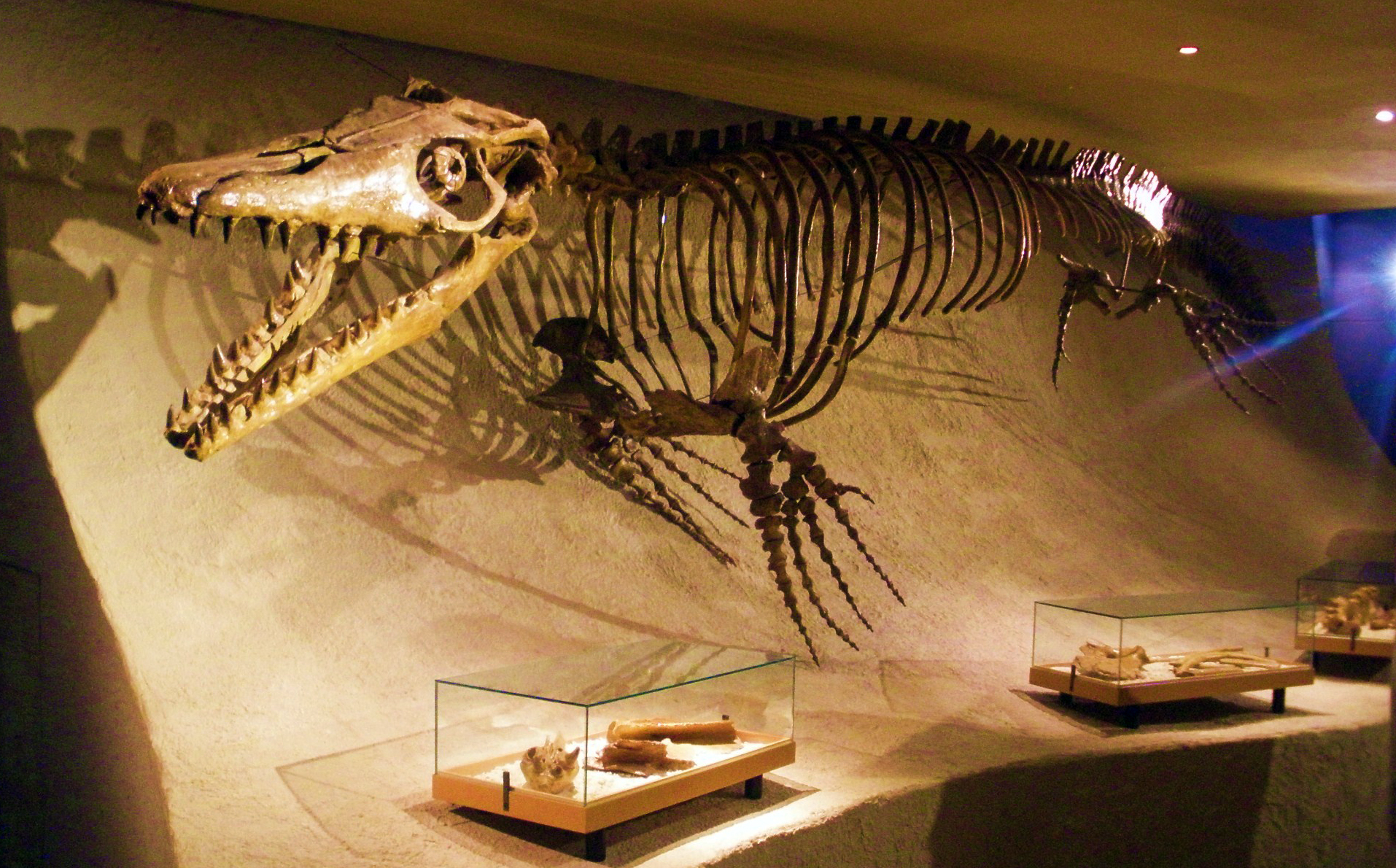
Skeleton cast of a Mosasaurus hoffmanni on display in 2011
