= Dickinson Museum Center =

Coordinates: 46°53′41.22″N 102°47′0.56″W

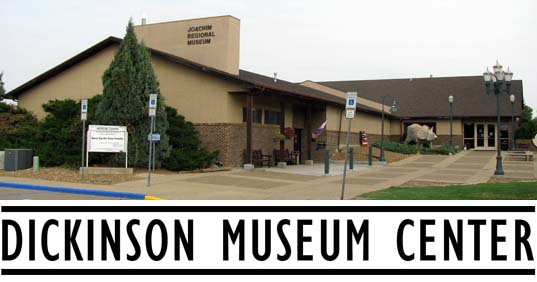
- Established: 1983
- Location: 188 Museum Dr. E, Dickinson, North Dakota, North Dakota, United States
- Type: Dinosaur & Regional History Museum
- Director: Robert Fuhrman
- Curators: Dr. Denver Fowler, Curator of Paleontology, Badlands Dinosaur Museum; Jessica Stratton, Collection Manager, Joachim Regional Museum
- Website: dickinsonmuseumcenter.com

The Dickinson Museum Center is and organization that preserves and presents history through a museum complex in Dickinson, North Dakota. The organization operates the museum center, which serves as a history museum for the city of Dickinson, Stark County, and Southwest North Dakota.

The museum consists of a city-owned, 12-acre (49,000 m^{2}) park that includes multiple buildings and is managed in part by several non-profit organizations.

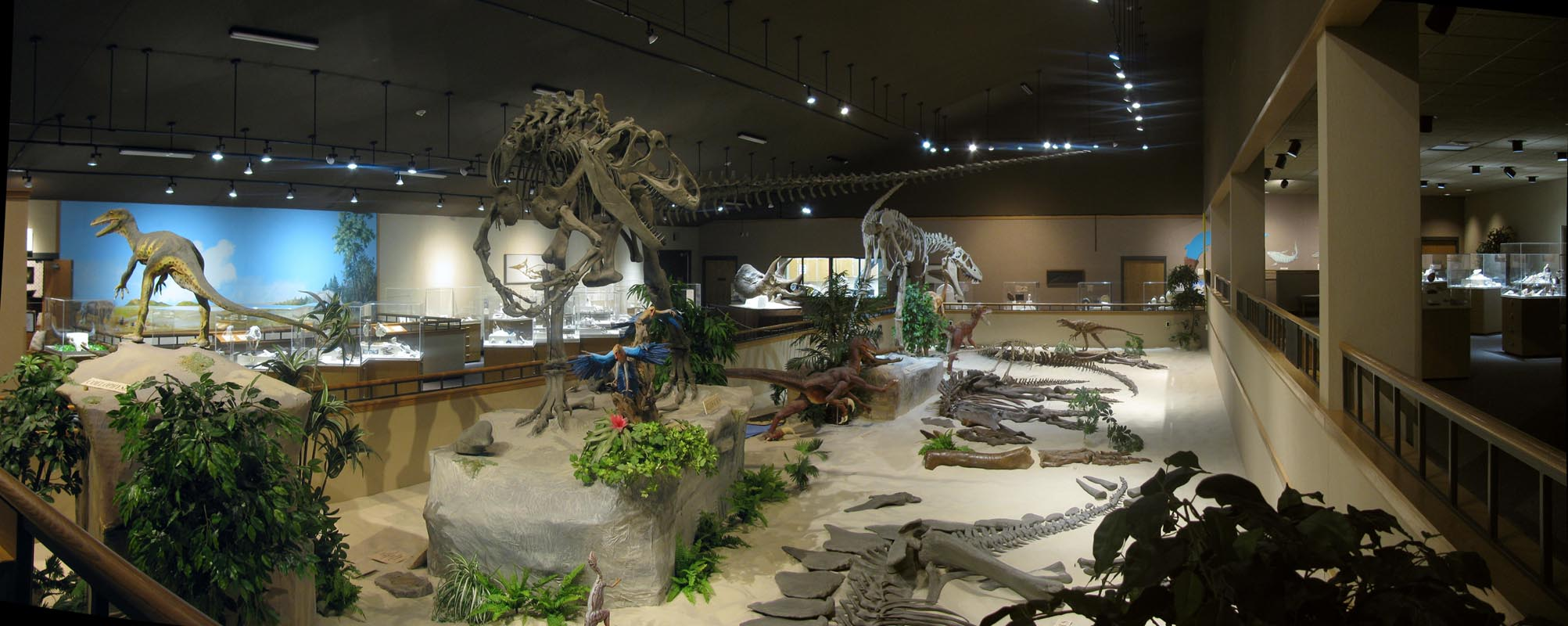
Badlands Dinosaur Museum features the largest display of dinosaur fossils in North Dakota

== Badlands Dinosaur Museum ==
This museum houses thousands of rock, mineral, and fossil specimens including a complete Triceratops skeleton, and award-winning feathered dinosaur models by artist Boban Filipovic. It was privately run from 1993 to 2015 during which time it was called "Dakota Dinosaur Museum". Since December 2015 it has been owned and operated by the City of Dickinson, and was renamed "Badlands Dinosaur Museum" in 2017.

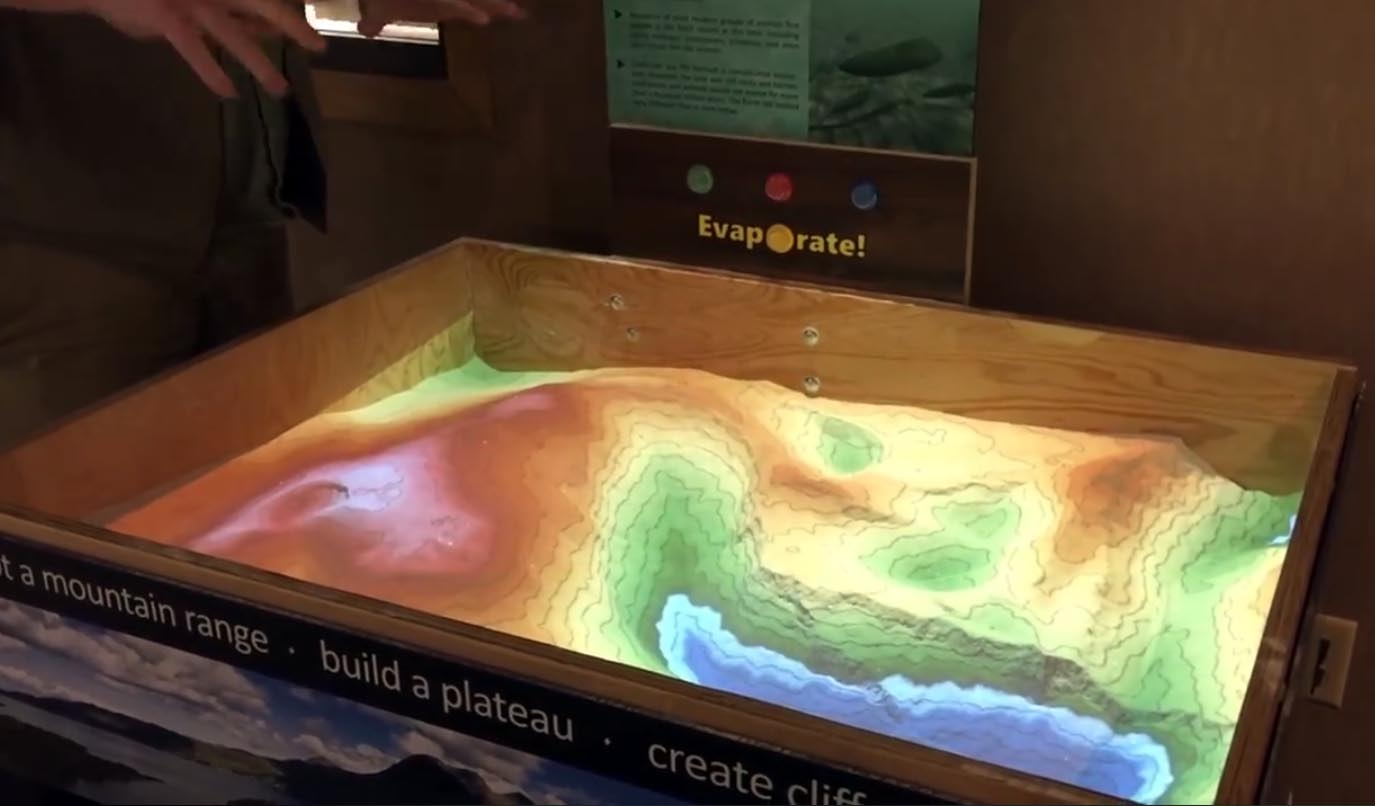
Augmented Reality sandbox - an interactive exhibit for children and adults

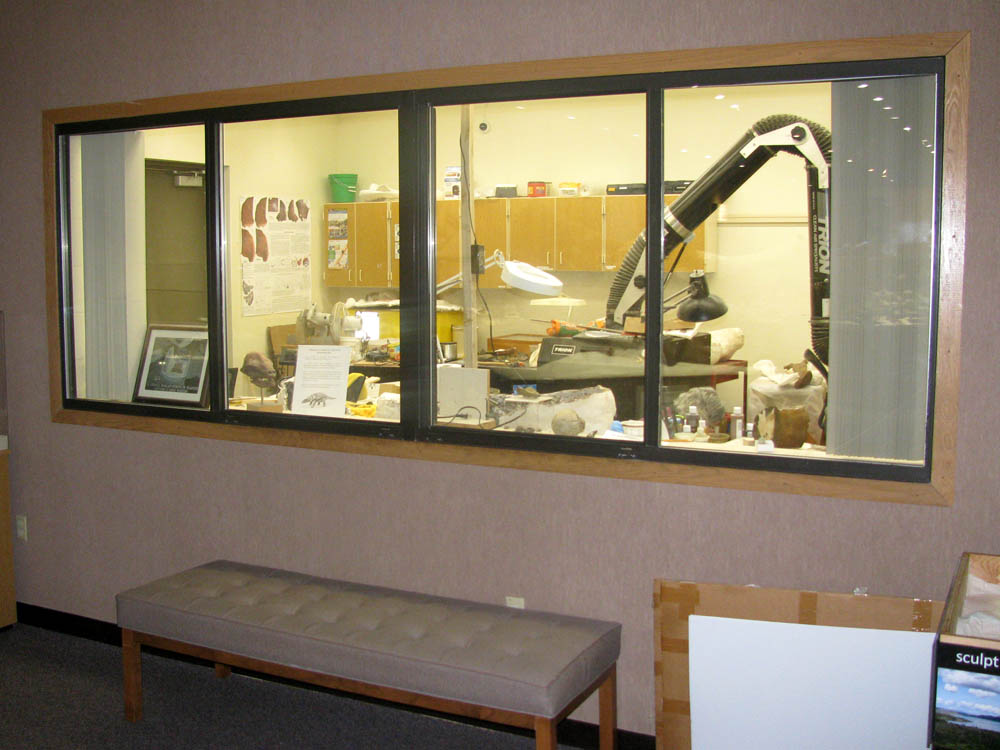
The dinosaur preparation laboratory is visible to museum visitors

== Joachim Regional Museum ==
The Joachim Regional Museum features local art and history exhibits, and is managed by the Southwestern North Dakota Museum Foundation. Permanent exhibits include a Western art gallery and a dollhouse. The building includes the Osborn Reading and Research Room.

== Prairie Outpost Park ==
Five historic and five reproduction buildings are located in the park east of the museum. Several other groups manage buildings and/or host events in the park throughout the year including Czech, Scandinavian, and Germans from Russia heritage organizations.

The historic buildings include a house, train depot, general store, church, and school. The reproduced buildings include a print shop, an ethnic German-Russian stone house, a Czech town hall, a Scandinavian Stabbur, and a blacksmith shop. Other structures in the park include the Heritage Pavilion picnic shelter, a veteran's chapel, an oil pumpjack, a coal car, a Northern Pacific train caboose, a windmill, and restrooms.

== Pioneer Machinery Hall ==
This museum focuses on the early agricultural and ranching history of Stark County, and includes threshing machines, tractors and other horse-drawn and mechanized farm equipment. The museum is operated by the Stark County Historical Society, and is located in Prairie Outpost Park.

== Other sites ==
=== Dickinson Convention and Visitors Bureau ===
The visitor's bureau provides information about local and regional attractions and events. The CVB is a separately managed organization from the Dickinson Museum Center.

== Historic Preservation Commission ==
The director of the Dickinson Museum Center, Eugene Krabs, also serves as Historic Preservationist for the city of Dickinson. The Historic Preservationist serves as staff liaison to the Historic Preservation Commission for the city.
