= Drimolen =

Cave near Johannesburg with prehistoric human remains

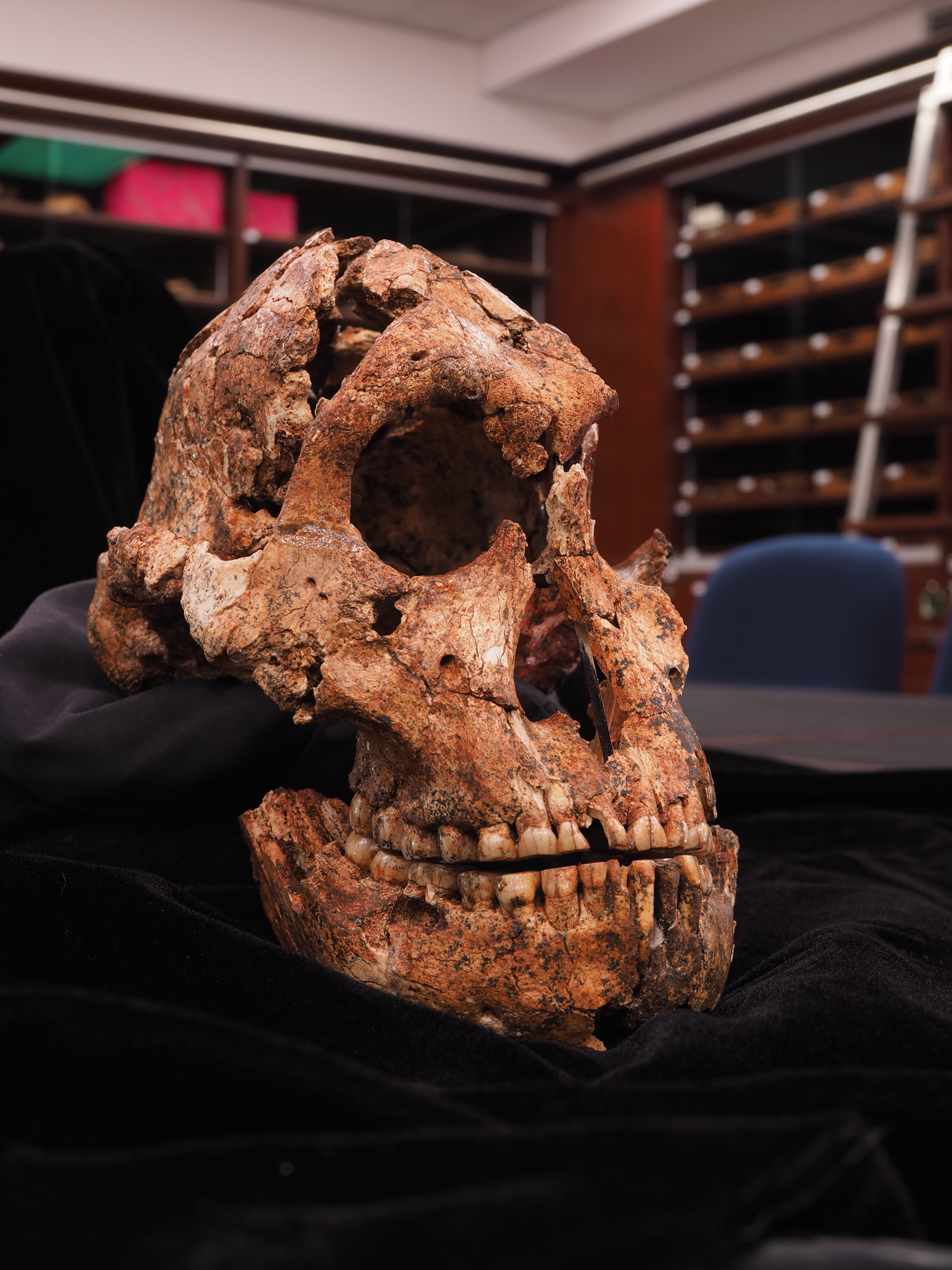
The DNH 7 Paranthropus robustus skull from DMQ, the most complete skull of this species ever discovered and a rare female example.

The Drimolen Palaeocave System consists of a series of terminal Pliocene to early Pleistocene hominin-bearing palaeocave fills located around 40 kilometres (25 mi) north of Johannesburg, South Africa, and about 6 kilometres (3.7 mi) north of Sterkfontein in the UNESCO World Heritage Site Cradle of Humankind.

== History of Research ==
Conventionally it is considered that the site was discovered on 9 July 1992 by Andre Keyser, however Murray Obbes, who was conducting field survey as part of his masters projects at the Rand Afrikaans University (now the University of Johannesburg) claims to have found the site and showed it and the fossils to Keyser. Either way Andre Keyser directed excavations at the site until his death in 2010.

- On 21 October 1994, Keyser discovered the DNH 7 (Eurydice) skull, the most complete Paranthropus robustus skull found. It is also considered a rare female skull of P. robustus. DNH 8, a male mandible called "Orpheus" was also discovered at the same time and adjacent to DNH 7.

Colin Menter directed research and excavations at the site from 2010 until 2016. Excavations at the site were conducted by technical assistants in the early years and by a number of field schools in the latter years. These include the University of Florence, Italy (2006–2012), the University of Victoria, Canada (2011, 2012, 2014), and La Trobe University, Australia (2013–present).

The permit and excavations at the site were taken over by Stephanie Baker of the Palaeo-Research Institute University of Johannesburg in 2017 in collaboration with Prof. Andy I.R. Herries of La Trobe University (& the University of Johannesburg) as part of an Australian Research Council Discovery Project (2017–21). This also involves collaborations with David Strait of Washington University in St Louis, who runs a US based field school at Drimolen every June, as well as researchers from South Africa, Australia, the US and Italy.

== Drimolen Main Quarry (DMQ) ==
All the hominin remains have been recovered from the classic area of the site known as the Drimolen Main Quarry (DMQ), and include remains of Paranthropus robustus, early Homo and Homo erectus

- In 2015 a partial cranium (DNH 134) of Homo erectus was discovered by La Trobe University Archaeology Field School student Richard Curtis. The cranium represents an individual that was around 2–3 years old and has a reconstructed cranial capacity of 484 to 593 cm^{3}, making it only very slightly smaller than the proposed adult female Homo erectus cranium (≈598 cm^{3}) DAN5/P1 from Gona in Ethiopia. The cranium has nicknamed "Simon" after one of the Drimolen excavation team, Simon Mokobane, who died in 2018.
- On South African Father's Day (17 June) 2018 a partial cranium (DNH 155) of Paranthropus robustus was discovered by field school student Samantha Good. The cranium is an adult male and is the most complete male cranium of the species discovered. The cranium was published in 2020 and was argued to represent an earlier part of the P. robustus lineage when compared to younger fossils from the nearby Swartkrans Member 1 Hanging Remnant, thus documenting microevolution within P. robustus

DMQ has been dated to between ≈2.04 and 1.95 Ma based on a combination of uranium-lead (U-Pb), uranium-series electron spin resonance (US-ESR) and palaeomagnetism. The DMQ deposits record a geomagnetic reversal from reversed to normal polarity. Based on the U-Pb dating (1.962 ± 0.107 Ma) of an intermediate polarity flowstone (the Walls of Jericho Flowstone) that formed in the middle of this reversal it has been attributed to the reversal at the base of the Olduvai SubChron at ≈1.95 Ma. A US-ESR date of 1.965 ± 0.147 Ma just beneath the flowstone further confirms this age. Another US-ESR age of 2.041 ± 0.240 Ma at the same depth as the DNH 134 H. erectus cranium indicates it dates to between ≈2.04 and 1.95 Ma, making it the oldest example of Homo erectus. The DNH 155 and 152 craniums come from a few metres higher than DNH 134 but have the same age range.

DMQ has also yielded some of the world's oldest bone tools and some of South Africa's oldest stone tools. It is also the first site in the region to have yielded two species of Dinofelis in the same deposit, Dinofelis cf. barlowi and Dinofelis aff. piveteaui.. Many of the species at the site are either the first or last appearance of the species in the region and suggest a significant faunal turnover at the time.

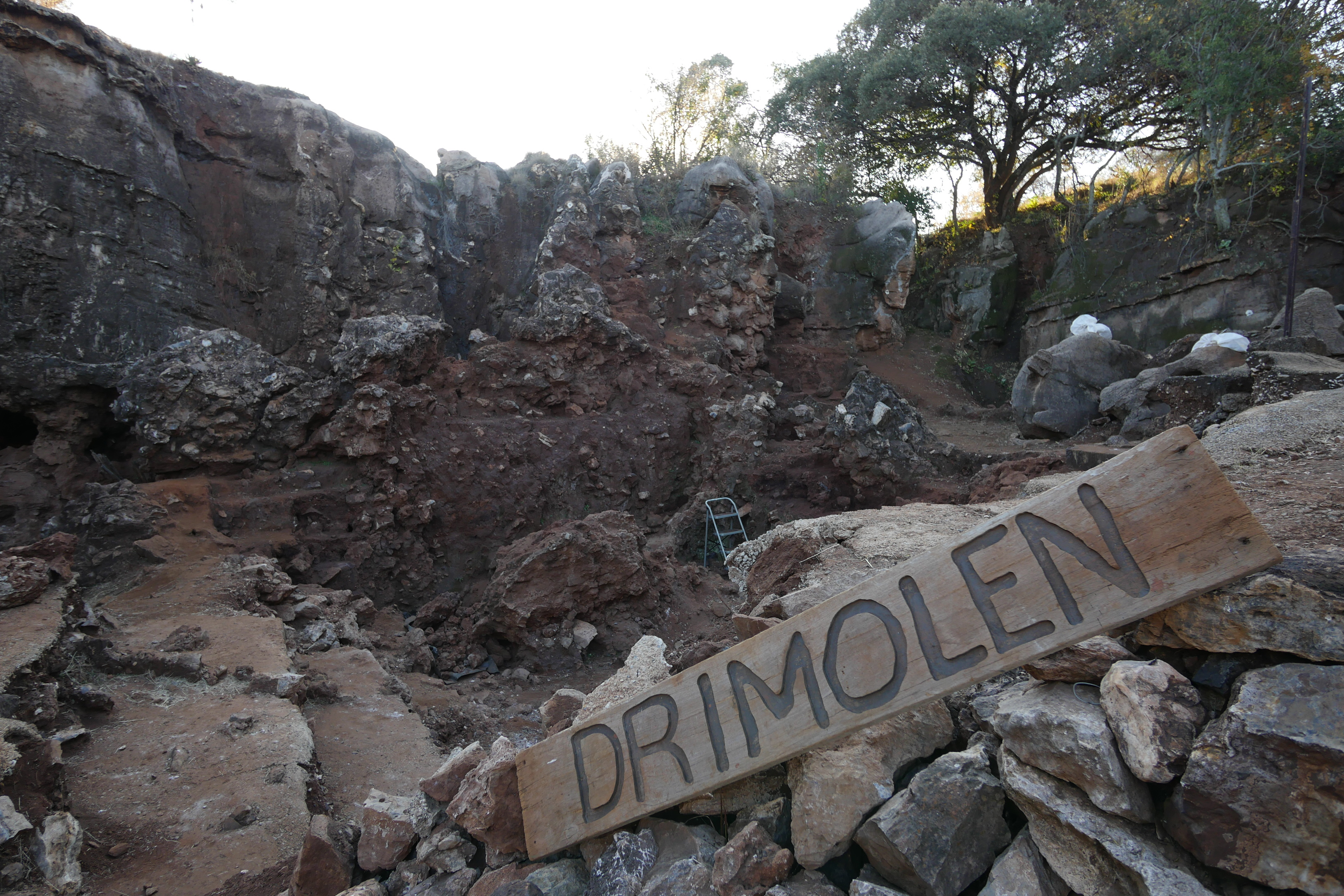
Drimolen Main Quarry

== Drimolen Makondo (DMK) ==
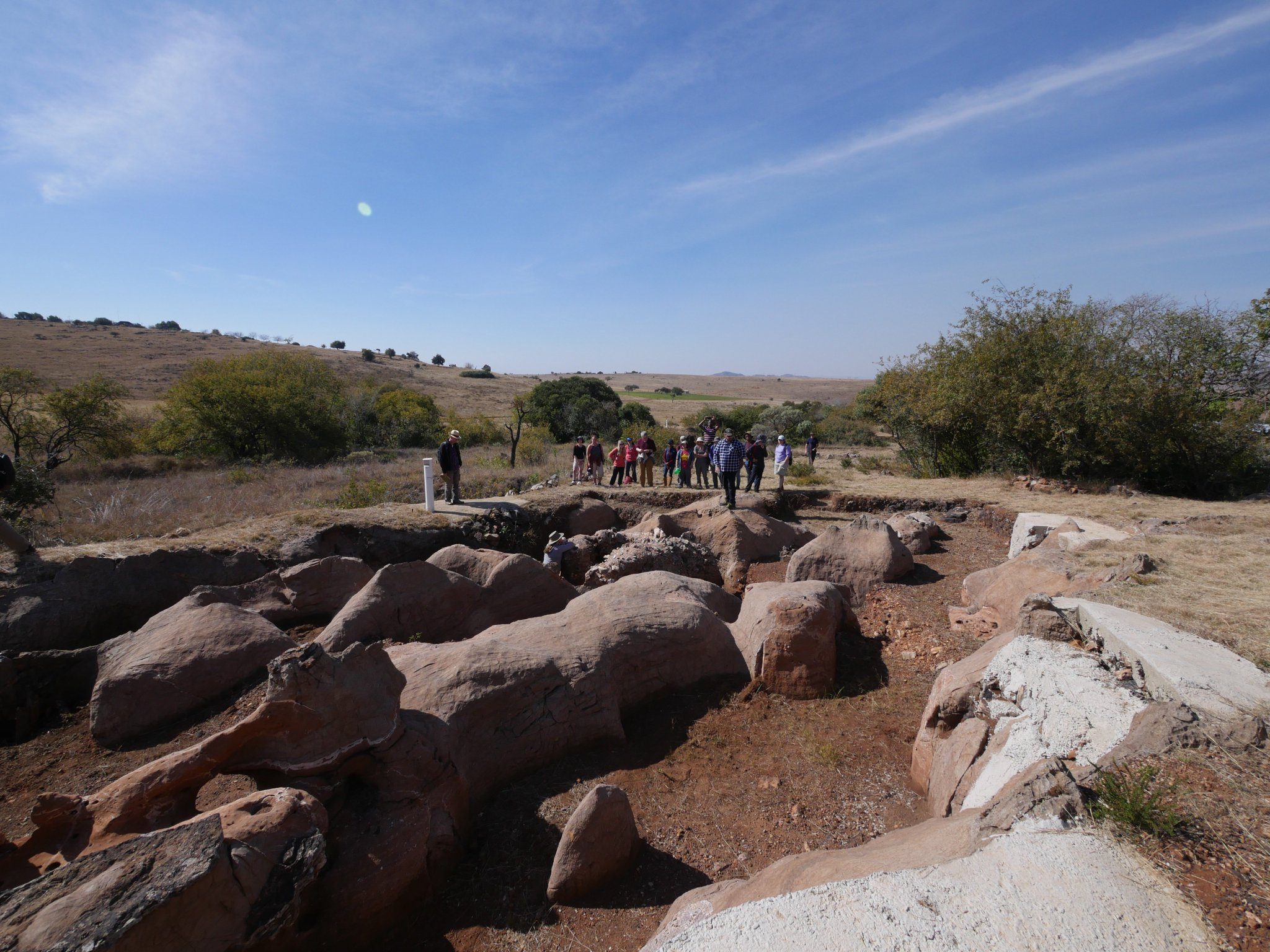
The 2.61 million year old Drimolen Makondo fossil-bearing palaeocave in South Africa

In 2013, a new fossil deposit was discovered around 50 metres (160 ft) away from the Main Quarry that is known as the Drimolen Makondo (DMK). DMK has not yielded any hominin remains but has been dated to a much older time period around 2.61 Ma, making it similar in age to sites such as Sterkfontein Member 4 and parts of the Makapansgat Limeworks.

While DMQ consists of a single large palaeocavern, DMK consists of a series of interconnecting, low maze-like passages. It is not known how the two caves relate to each other and whether they were once part of the same interconnected cave system, but basal speleothems in each deposit have been dated by uranium-lead to ≈2.6 million years ago, the same age as flowstones underlying the Australopithecus africanus bearing Sterkfontein Member 4 and capping the A. africanus bearing Makapansgat Limeworks Member 3 deposits.
