= Badlands Dinosaur Museum =

Coordinates: 46°53′41″N 102°47′00″W

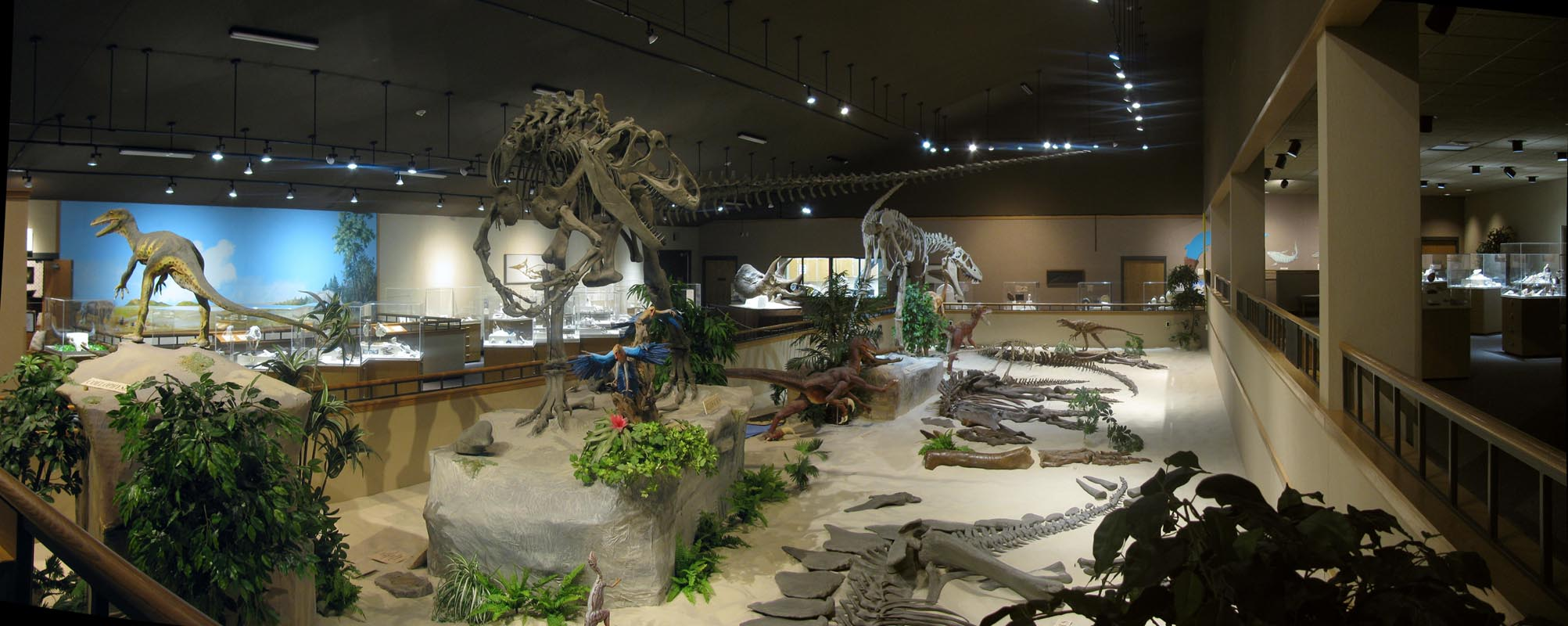
- Main Exhibit Hall
- Former name: Dakota Dinosaur Museum
- Established: 1992
- Location: 188 Museum Dr. E, Dickinson, North Dakota, North Dakota, United States
- Type: Dinosaur & Paleontology Museum
- Director: Robert Fuhrman
- Curator: Dr. Denver Fowler
- Website: dickinsonmuseumcenter.com

Badlands Dinosaur Museum in Dickinson, North Dakota, United States, reopened on May 17, 2016, after over twenty years operating as Dakota Dinosaur Museum. It is part of the museum complex at Dickinson Museum Center.

The 13,400-square-foot (1,240 m^{2}) museum includes dinosaur skeletons, skulls, and reconstructions, with dozens of displays featuring other fine fossils and minerals. Notable exhibits include international award-winning feathered dinosaur models, a complete Triceratops prorsus skull; the holotype skull of the tyrannosaur Daspletosaurus wilsoni; a complete skull of the only Lambeosaurus collected from the USA; an articulated hadrosaur arm with mummified skin; and full standing mounts of Stegosaurus, Allosaurus, Thescelosaurus, Saurornitholestes and Albertosaurus.

== History ==
"Dakota Dinosaur Museum" was the original name for the museum which was first proposed in 1987, and opened in 1994. The original exhibit included skeletons and models made by companies and artists from Utah, Texas, and North Dakota. Most of the artifacts in the original museum were donated by Larry and Alice League.

In 2015, ownership of the museum's fossil collection and related exhibits was transferred to the City of Dickinson. Under this new management, the museum reopened on May 17, 2016 as the Dinosaur Museum at Dickinson Museum Center. In 2017 the museum was renamed "Badlands Dinosaur Museum", as one of the first steps in a complete overhaul of the exhibits and museum infrastructure.

Since 2016 Badlands Dinosaur Museum has been collecting dinosaur fossils from the Judith River Formation of Montana, with many of the latest discoveries on display in the museum, or visible in the public viewing preparation lab.

== Opening hours ==
The museum is open Mon-Sat, 9am-5pm year-round. In summer the museum is also open on Sundays 12pm-5pm.
