= Hanksville-Burpee Quarry =

Quarry in the USA

Coordinates: 38.4520°N 110.7906°W

Hanksville-Burpee Quarry is a paleontological excavation site approximately 150 feet (46 m) wide by 600 feet (180 m) long near Hanksville, Utah, US, where scientists have found a large mix of remains of sauropods, trees, freshwater clams and other species dating between 145 million years ago to 150 million years ago. The mixed assortment of remains deposited in this one location provide a unique opportunity to scientists to study the paleoecology of the area in the late Jurassic period.

In June 2008, following three weeks of excavation, paleontologists from the Burpee Museum of Natural History and Western Illinois University announced major discoveries made at the site, including a probable Stegosaurus, four sauropods and at least two carnivorous dinosaurs. The researchers expressed confidence that future excavations at the site would come to rival those produced from Dinosaur National Monument and the Cleveland-Lloyd Dinosaur Quarry, two major sources of giant Jurassic reptile remains.

The site is located on federal land overseen by the United States Bureau of Land Management and is part of the Morrison Formation, which is a significant source for the largest known dinosaur remains. Paleogeographic evidence indicates that the Hanksville-Burpee Quarry area was situated at the bend of a large river during a time of sediment deposition. Researchers point to the large number of animal remains collected at the single location, and suggest the river bend acted as a trap for carcasses of large animals that died upriver and were carried downstream by high waters.
