= BURP domain =

InterPro Domain

BURP

Identifiers
- Symbol: BURP
- Pfam: PF03181
- InterPro: IPR004873
Available protein structures:
- PDB: IPR004873 PF03181 (ECOD; PDBsum)
- AlphaFold: IPR004873; PF03181

In molecular biology, the BURP domain is a ~230-amino acid protein domain, which has been named for the four members of the group initially identified, BNM2, USP, RD22, and PG1beta. It is found in the C-terminal part of a number of plant cell wall proteins, which are defined not only by the BURP domain, but also by the overall similarity in their modular construction. The BURP domain proteins consists of either three or four modules: (i) an N-terminal hydrophobic domain - a presumptive transit peptide, joined to (ii) a short conserved segment or other short segment, (iii) an optional segment consisting of repeated units which is unique to each member, and (iv) the C-terminal BURP domain. Although the BURP domain proteins share primary structural features, their expression patterns and the conditions under which they are expressed differ. The presence of the conserved BURP domain in diverse plant proteins suggests an important role for this domain. It is possible that the BURP domain represents a general motif for localization of proteins within the cell wall matrix. The other structural domains associated with the BURP domain may specify other target sites for intermolecular interactions.

Some proteins known to contain a BURP domain are listed below:

- Brassica protein BNM2, which is expressed during the induction of microspore embryogenesis.
- Field bean USPs, abundant non-storage seed proteins with unknown function.
- Soybean USP-like proteins ADR6 (or SALI5-4A), an auxin-repressible, aluminium-inducible protein and SALI3-2, a protein that is up-regulated by aluminium.
- Soybean seed coat BURP-domain protein 1 (SCB1). It might play a role in the differentiation of the seed coat parenchyma cells.
- Arabidopsis RD22 drought induced protein.
- Maize ZRP2, a protein of unknown function in cortex parenchyma.
- Tomato PG1beta, the beta-subunit of polygalacturonase isozyme 1 (PG1), which is expressed in ripening fruits.
- Cereal RAFTIN. It is essential specifically for the maturation phase of pollen development.
