= Burpee Museum of Natural History =

Museum in Rockford, Illinois, US

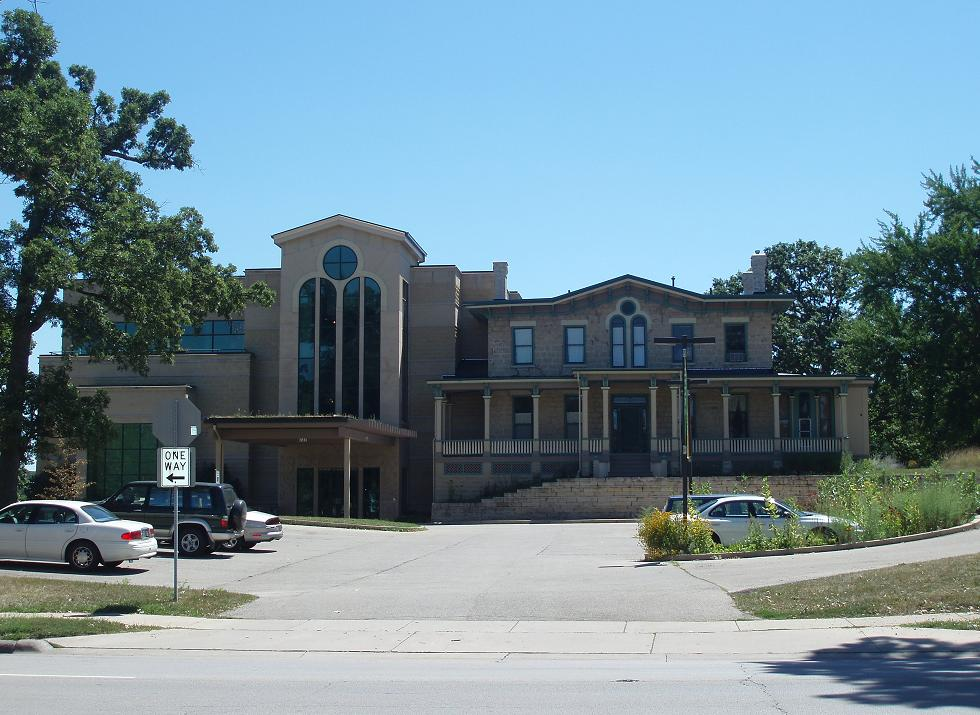
- The Burpee Museum of Natural History, with the Solem Wing on the left and the Manny Mansion on the right
- Established: 1942
- Location: 737 North Main St. Rockford, Illinois
- Coordinates: 42.2773°N 89.0882°W
- Type: Natural history
- Public transit access: RMTD
- Website: www.burpee.org

The Burpee Museum of Natural History is located along the Rock River in downtown Rockford, Illinois, United States, at 737 North Main Street.

== Museum history ==
Established in 1941 and opened on May 24, 1942, the museum was created as a Works Progress Administration project. The complex is made up of four buildings—the Manny Mansion, the Barnes Mansion, the Solem Wing, and the Water Lab.

The Solem Wing is the public portion of Burpee Museum. Built in the winter of 1998, the Solem Wing houses the museum's exhibits, meeting rooms, laboratories, gift shop, and the Mahlburg Auditorium. It is named after Robert H. Solem who was a major benefactor, patron, and friend of the museum.

The Manny Mansion was owned by John P. Manny and was built in 1852. Formerly the Burpee Art Museum, it is now attached to the south side of the Solem Wing and houses museum classrooms and offices.

Prior to the expansion, the museum was housed entirely in the Barnes Mansion. Built in 1893, the mansion was owned by industrialist William Fletcher Barnes. Today, the Barnes Mansion houses meeting rooms and the administrative offices.

The Water Lab (funded by Aqua Aerobic) is a lab facility along the Rock River in which students in grades 6 through high school collect water samples from the river and analyze them for physical, chemical and biological parameters.

== Exhibits ==
=== Jane-Diary of a Dinosaur ===
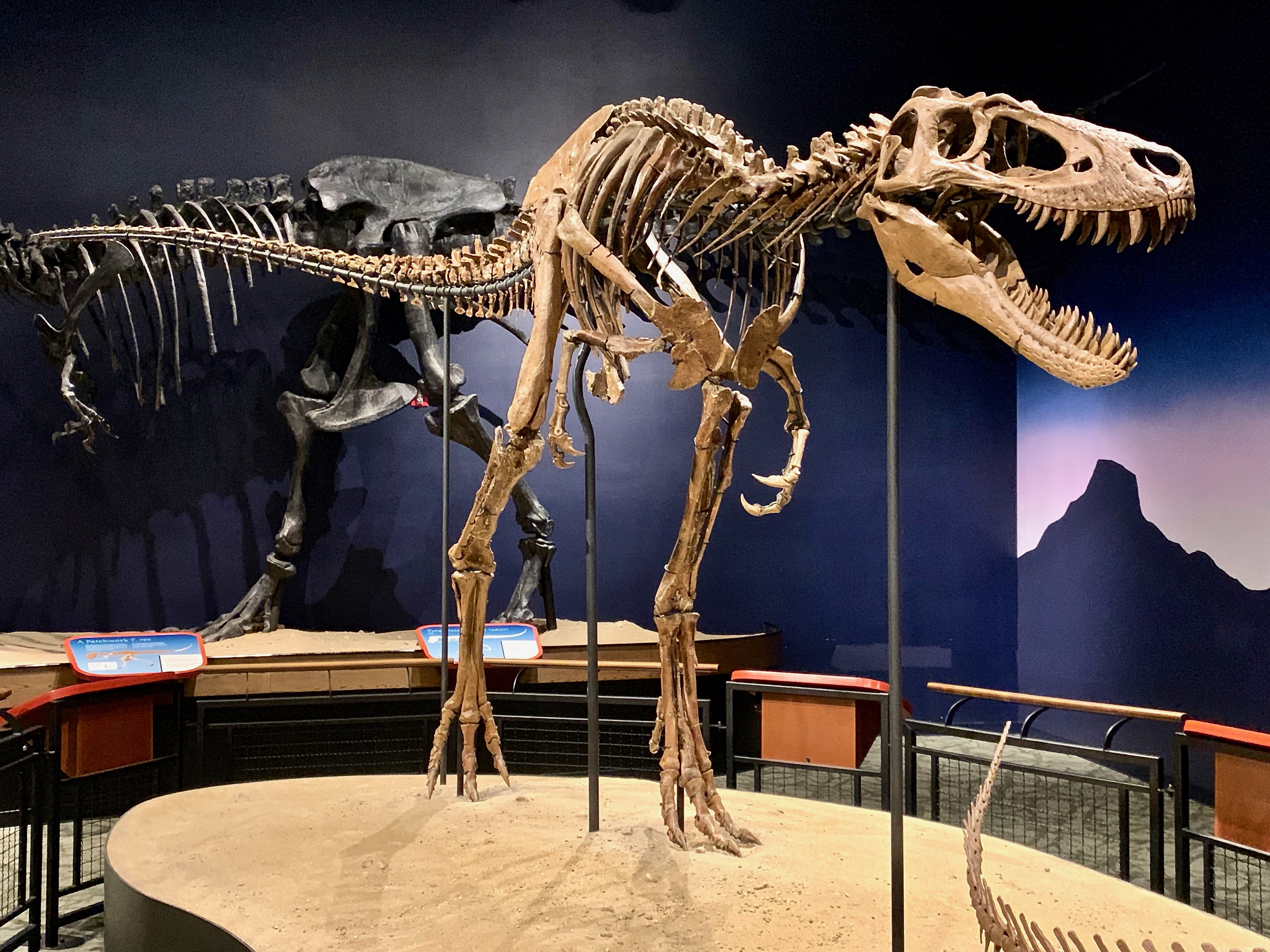
Jane, the holotype of Nanotyrannus lethaeus on display at the Burpee Museum

Jane (BMRP 2002.4.1) is a juvenile Nanotyrannus lethaeus discovered in the Hell Creek Formation in southeastern Montana during the summer of 2001 by Carol Tuck and Bill Harrison, team members of an expedition led by Burpee Museum curator Michael Henderson, "She" is named after Burpee Museum benefactor Jane Solem. After four years of preparation, Jane is on display as the centerpiece of the exhibit at Burpee Museum, "Jane: Diary of a Dinosaur". Visitors can discover what happened during the 66 million years she lay buried, visit a re-creation of the expedition's Montana base camp, and view her fully restored 21-foot skeleton. She was 11 years old at death, and is half as big as the Tyrannosaurus rex "Sue", who is 43 feet long and resides at Chicago's Field Museum. Jane's weight was probably nearly 1,500 lb (680 kg). Her big feet and long powerful legs indicate she was built for speed. Her lower jaw has 17 finely curved, serrated, razor-sharp teeth designed to tear into flesh.

Rockford's Jane exhibit also contains scale casts of other dinosaurs, including a 40-foot Tyrannosaurus rex. Another exhibit is Homer, the most complete subadult Triceratops fossil yet discovered in the Hell Creek Formation of southeastern Montana, found by Helmuth Redschlag in July 2005. Homer is the primary constituent of the first Triceratops bone bed, at a site discovered in Carter county on land leased to ranchers by the Bureau of Land Management (BLM). Preparation of Homer began in the summer of 2005, and was completed in late August 2012. The complete skeleton will be on display as part of the Homer's Odyssey exhibit, coming in May 2013.

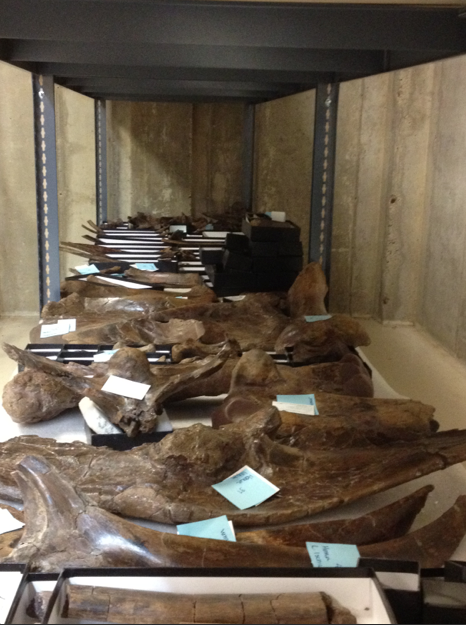
Homer's postcrania after preparation, August 2012. The bones are preparing to be mounted for display as part of a new exhibit opening May 2013.

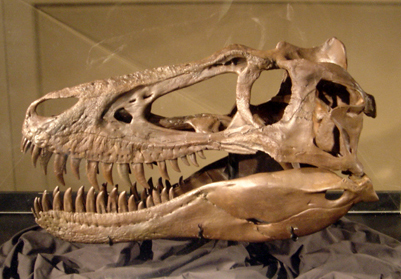
Jane the dinosaur's skull replica

In July 2006 The Science Channel aired The Mystery Dinosaur, a one-hour documentary on the discovery and continuing scientific argument over whether Jane is a juvenile T. rex or an adult Nanotyrannus lancensis. The Mystery Dinosaur aired on the Discovery Channel in the fall of 2006.

In March 2007, Jane was nominated as one of Illinois' Seven Wonders.

=== The Carboniferous Coal Forest ===
A two-story tall prehistoric coal forest displays local landscape, insects and amphibians as they existed 300 million years ago. Featuring life-size replicas of giant insects and tetrapods, the diorama acts as an analogue to the Mazon Creek fossil beds, a Carboniferous-age geological Lagerstätten in central Illinois, responsible for the preservation of most of the area's coal. Chief among the exhibit's specimens is Tullimonstrum gregarium, the Tully Monster, which is the enigmatic state fossil of Illinois.

=== The Ordovician Sea ===
An exhibit located adjacent to the front desk featuring local fossils from the Ordovician Platteville, Mifflin, and Grand Detour Formations, as well as a diorama of life in the prehistoric Rockford; an expansive sea and coral margin 455 million years in the making.

=== Geoscience ===
Displays focus on how the earth was formed and the forces at work shaping our planet. Included are exhibits on economic, world and regional geology; a 10-foot glacier model; displays of unusual rocks, gems, and minerals; and information on plate tectonics and land formations.

=== The First People ===
Displays and exhibits give the history of humankind in North America. The First People features a full-size wigwam and tipi, an American bison, and a dugout canoe that can be climbed into. The display includes video presentations focused on Native American lifestyles and archeology.

=== Windows to Wilderness-Exploring nature in the Rock River Valley ===
Focusing on the wildlife of the Rock River Valley, the Windows to Wilderness exhibit includes live and mounted wildlife; scale recreations of common landscapes and environments of the Rock River Valley. This exhibit includes hands-on activities designed to entertain children.

=== The Fossil Preparation Viewing Lab ===
The Fossil Preparation Lab is a window into how the museum works. The Burpee Museum is home to a staff of vertebrate fossil preparators and scientists who restore and curate specimens collected at the museum's dig sites abroad, including Montana, Utah, and Wyoming. Located on the lower level, the viewing area's large glass windows reveal the biology and paleontology laboratories where specimens are prepared for the museum's collections and exhibits. Visitors can view exhibit and collection pieces as they are prepared and researched before going on exhibit or into the permanent collection. The Burpee Museum of Natural History maintains more than 100 thousand items in its permanent collection.

== See also ==
- Hanksville-Burpee Quarry
