= Missing Link (1988 film) =

- Theatrical release poster
- Directed by: David Hughes; Carol Hughes
- Written by: David Hughes; Carol Hughes
- Produced by: Dennis B. Kane
- Starring: Peter Elliott; Michael Gambon
- Cinematography: David Hughes; Carol Hughes
- Music by: Sammy Hurden; Mike Trim
- Distributed by: Universal Pictures
- Release date: November 25, 1988
- Running time: 91 minutes
- Country: United States
- Language: English

Missing Link is a 1988 film written and directed by Carol and David Hughes and starring Peter Elliott as the Man Ape and narrated by Michael Gambon.

== Plot ==
The film is set in Africa roughly one million years ago, at a time when one species of "man-apes" (Australopithecus robustus) was being displaced by the ancestors of modern humans. These ancestors are possibly Homo erectus, but they are never named in the film. They are only addressed as "man" and from the few scenes where they show any visibility, they vaguely resemble modern humans.

The film follows the last of the man-apes (Peter Elliott) as he wanders through the wilderness after his tribe is slaughtered by the aggressive humans who have invented the ax and have learned to make use of fire. He journeys through a savanna, an oasis, a desert, and eventually the shores of a beach. Along the way, he avoids the humans that killed his family and witnesses many fantastic sights of wildlife. After experiencing a hallucination brought on by ingesting a hallucinogenic plant (possibly a reference to the stoned ape theory), he realizes that the stone ax he has been carrying after finding it at the site where his tribe was killed is a weapon. When he comes across a human footprint at the ocean shore, he sniffs it and then starts hitting it, wanting revenge against the humans. But he then relents and tosses the ax into the ocean. The closing scene has him sitting mournfully on the beach as the sun sets. The closing text states that the "man-apes" were likely the first species humanity pushed into extinction.
