= Little Red Riding Hood (1996 film) =

1996 film

- VHS cover
- Based on: "Little Red Riding Hood and the Wolf" by Roald Dahl
- Written by: Donald Sturrock
- Directed by: Donald Sturrock
- Starring: Julie Walters; Ian Holm; Peter Elliott; Danny DeVito
- Music by: Paul Patterson
- Country of origin: United Kingdom
- Original language: English

Production
- Executive producer: Nigel Williams
- Producer: Robert Warr
- Cinematography: Mike Southon
- Editor: David Yardley
- Running time: 44 minutes
- Production companies: The Roald Dahl Foundation; Picture Music International

Original release
- Network: BBC One
- Release: 1 January 1996

Roald Dahl's Little Red Riding Hood, or simply Little Red Riding Hood, is a 1996 British fantasy comedy television film written and directed by Donald Sturrock, based on the poem "Little Red Riding Hood and the Wolf" from the 1982 book Revolting Rhymes by Roald Dahl.

Roald Dahl's Little Red Riding Hood debuted in the United Kingdom on 1 January 1996, on BBC One.

== Cast ==
- Julie Walters as Little Red Riding Hood and Grandma
- Ian Holm as Don Mini
- Peter Elliott as Wolfie
- Danny Devito as the voice of Wolfie
- Scott Ambler as She-Wolf
- Etta Murfitt as Cat Waiter
- Andrew George as Hyena
- Emily Piercy as Drooling Cow
- Maxine Fone as Toothy Sheep
- Phillip Hill as Prussian Sow
- Ken Gordon, Kai Sones and Kate Williams as Piglets
- Violetta Mazzotta and Carly Kober as Fawns
- Jessica Fox, Chloe Kusander and Leanne Gibson as Lambkins
- Franz Welser-Möst as Chauffeur

== Background ==
Following a musical work that premiered at the Royal Festival Hall in London on 1 November 1992 based on the poem "Little Red Riding Hood and the Wolf" from the 1982 book Revolting Rhymes by Roald Dahl, it was turned into a television film for the BBC's arts series Omnibus.

== Home video ==
The film was released on VHS by EMI Records UK.
