= Revolting Rhymes =

1982 poetry collection by Roald Dahl

- First edition
- Author: Roald Dahl
- Original title: Roald Dahl's Revolting Rhymes
- Illustrator: Quentin Blake
- Language: English
- Subject: Fairy tales
- Genre: Children's poetry, satire
- Publisher: Jonathan Cape
- Publication date: March 13, 1982
- Publication place: United Kingdom
- Media type: Hardback
- ISBN: 978-0-8479-8713-9

Revolting Rhymes is a 1982 poetry collection by British author Roald Dahl. Originally published under the title Roald Dahl's Revolting Rhymes, it is a parody of traditional folk tales in verse, where Dahl gives a re-interpretation of six well-known fairy tales, featuring surprise endings in place of the traditional happily-ever-after finishes.

== Contents ==
There are a total of six poems in the book, each of the featured fairy tales humorously deviating from the traditional version.

In Cinderella, the plot stayed true to the original tale until one of the ugly sisters switches her shoe with the one Cinderella left behind at the ball. When the prince sees that the shoe fits one of the sisters, however, he decides not to marry her, and instead chops off her head on the spot while she is standing. When the prince removes the head of the second sister and tries to do the same to Cindy, she wishes to be married instead to a decent man. Her fairy godmother grants this wish and marries her to a simple, regular jam-maker.

In Jack and the Beanstalk, the beanstalk grows golden leaves towards the top. Jack's mother sends him up to fetch them, but when Jack hears the giant threaten to eat him after the giant smells him, he descends without collecting any of the gold. Jack's mother then ascends herself after accusing Jack of being smelly, but is eaten. Undeterred, Jack decides to bathe, and then climbs up and collects the leaves himself, as the giant is now unable to smell him since he is clean. Now rich, Jack resolves to bathe every day.

Snow White and the Seven Dwarfs begins familiarly, but after the huntsman agrees not to kill Snow White, she takes a job as a cook and maid for seven former jockeys (the dwarfs). Although those jockeys are compulsive gamblers on horse racing, they are not particularly successful. Snow White resolves to help them, and sneaks back to steal the magic mirror, which can correctly predict the winning horse and makes the seven jockeys (and Snow White) millionaires, with the moral that "Gambling is not a sin / Provided that you always win".

Goldilocks and the Three Bears has a slightly different set-up to the rest of the poems, in that the story is kept the same as the traditional tale, but with continual comments from the narrator about how appalling Goldilocks is and how anyone with any sense would take the bears' side over hers (with the narrator telling the story as if talking to the Mother Bear). After the end, the narrator says that they would prefer an ending where the three bears come back and eat Goldilocks.

In Little Red Riding Hood and the Wolf, based on Little Red Riding Hood, the wolf enters the grandmother's house and devours her before putting on her clothes to eat Little Red Riding Hood next. Riding Hood is not disturbed however, and calmly pulls a pistol out of her underwear and shoots the wolf ("The small girl smiles/Her eyelid flickers/She whips a pistol from her knickers/She aims it at the creature's head and BANG! BANG! BANG! she shoots him ... dead".) – yielding her a new wolfskin coat.

In The Three Little Pigs, the wolf quickly blows down the houses of straw and sticks, devouring the first two pigs. The third house of bricks is too strong, so the wolf resolves to come back that evening with dynamite. The third pig has other plans, however, and asks Little Red Riding Hood to come and deal with the wolf. As a sharpshooter, Red Riding Hood gains a second wolfskin coat and a pigskin travelling case.

== Adaptations ==
=== Audio ===
An audiobook adaptation of the story released in the 1980s features the stories read by Prunella Scales and Timothy West; West narrated "Snow White and the Seven Dwarves", "Jack and the Beanstalk", "The Three Little Pigs" and "Cinderella", while Scales narrated "Little Red Riding Hood" and "Goldilocks and the Three Bears". This version shifted the order in which the stories were told, with "Cinderella" being told last instead of first, "Jack and the Beanstalk" being told after "Snow White" and "Goldilocks" being told after "The Three Little Pigs".

A 2002 adaptation of the story that was combined with Dirty Beasts was narrated entirely by Scottish actor Alan Cumming. The current 2014 digital version of the audiobook by Penguin is read by Miriam Margolyes, Stephen Mangan and Tamsin Greig.

=== Animation ===
The story was adapted into an original video animation (OVA) by Abbey Broadcast Communications in 1990, which was released straight-to-video through Abbey Home Entertainment. It was a faithful adaptation of the original story, which was told through Scales and West's audiobook recordings against animations in the style of Quentin Blake's illustrations. Re-releases from 1997 onwards redubbed Scales and West's narration with Martin Clunes and Dawn French in the respective stories.

The poem "Little Red Riding Hood and the Wolf" was adapted into the 1996 television film Little Red Riding Hood for BBC One.

The book was adapted into a 2016 two-part computer-animated television film for BBC One. It was nominated at the 90th Academy Awards for Best Animated Short.
