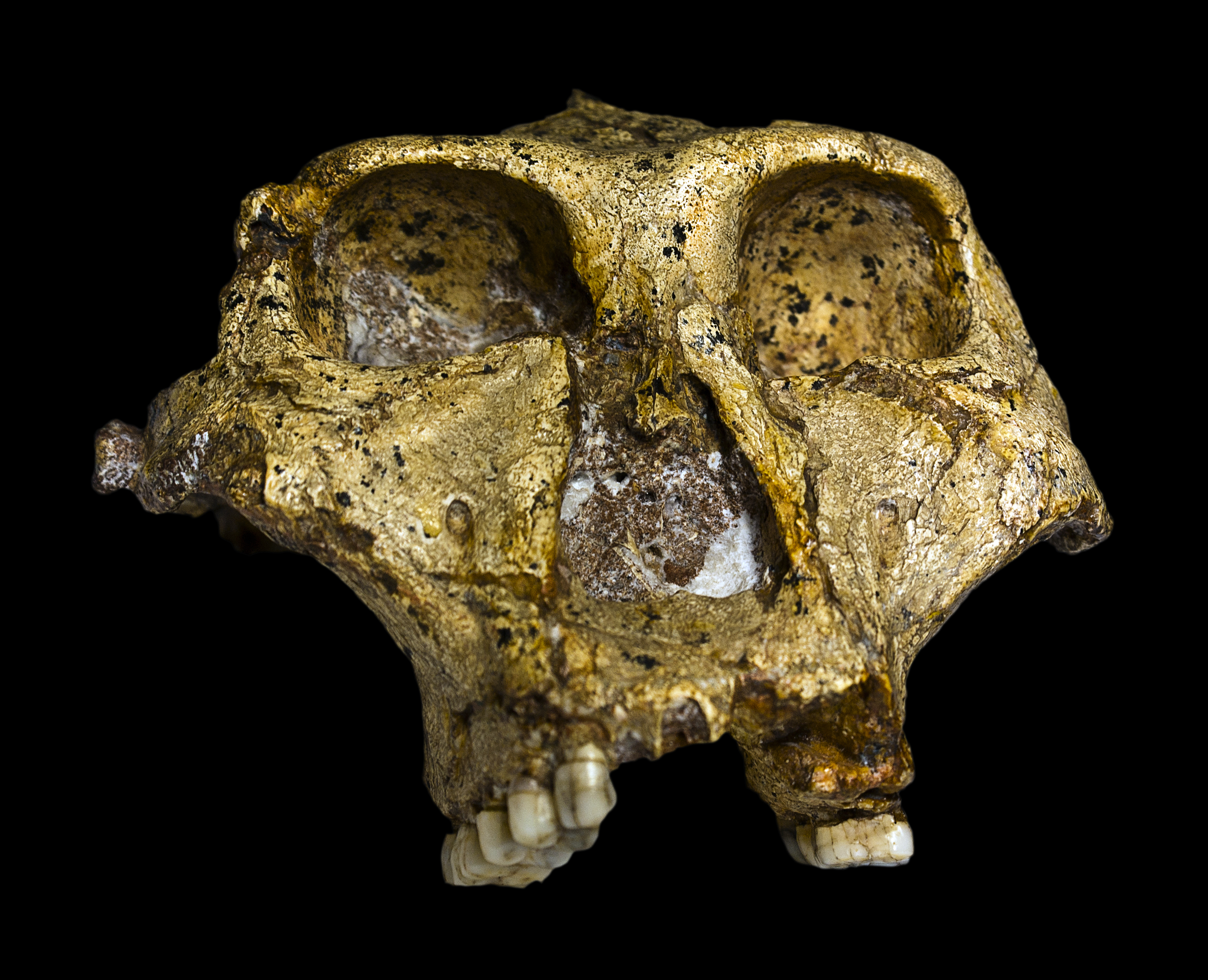
- Cast of the presumed-male SK 48 skull

Scientific classification
- Kingdom: Animalia
- Phylum: Chordata
- Class: Mammalia
- Order: Primates
- Superfamily: Hominoidea
- Family: Hominidae
- Genus: †Paranthropus
- Species: †P. robustus

Binomial name
- †Paranthropus robustus Broom, 1938

Synonyms
- P. crassidens Broom and Robinson, 1948; Australopithecus robustus Washburn and Patterson, 1951

= Paranthropus robustus =

Paranthropus robustus Temporal range: 2.27–0.87 Ma Pleistocene

Extinct species of hominin of South Africa

Paranthropus robustus is an extinct species of robust australopithecine from the Early and possibly Middle Pleistocene of the Cradle of Humankind, South Africa, about 2.27 to 0.87 (or, more conservatively, 2 to 1) million years ago. It has been identified in Kromdraai, Swartkrans, Sterkfontein, Gondolin, Cooper's, and Drimolen Caves. Discovered in 1938, it was among the first early hominins described, and became the type species for the genus Paranthropus. However, it has been argued by some that Paranthropus is an invalid grouping and synonymous with Australopithecus, so the species is also often classified as Australopithecus robustus.

Robust australopithecines—as opposed to gracile australopithecines—are characterised by heavily built skulls capable of producing high stresses and bite forces, as well as inflated cheek teeth (molars and premolars). Males had more heavily built skulls than females. P. robustus may have had a genetic susceptibility for pitting enamel hypoplasia on the teeth, and seems to have had a dental cavity rate similar to non-agricultural modern humans. The species is thought to have exhibited marked sexual dimorphism, with males substantially larger and more robust than females. Based on 3 specimens, males may have been 132 cm (4 ft 4 in) tall and females 110 cm (3 ft 7 in). Based on 4 specimens, males averaged 40 kg (88 lb) in weight and females 30 kg (66 lb). The brain volume of the specimen SK 1585 is estimated to have been 476 cc, and of DNH 155 about 450 cc (for comparison, the brain volume of contemporary Homo varied from 500 to 900 cc). P. robustus limb anatomy is similar to that of other australopithecines, which may indicate a less efficient walking ability than modern humans, and perhaps some degree of arboreality (movement in the trees).

P. robustus seems to have consumed a high proportion of C_{4} savanna plants. In addition, it may have also eaten fruits, underground storage organs (such as roots and tubers), and perhaps honey and termites. P. robustus may have used bones as tools to extract and process food. It is unclear if P. robustus lived in a harem society like gorillas or a multi-male society like baboons. P. robustus society may have been patrilocal, with adult females more likely to leave the group than males, but males may have been more likely to be evicted as indicated by higher male mortality rates and assumed increased risk of predation to solitary individuals. P. robustus contended with sabertooth cats, leopards, and hyenas on the mixed, open-to-closed landscape, and P. robustus bones probably accumulated in caves due to big cat predation. It is typically found in what were mixed open and wooded environments, and may have gone extinct in the Mid-Pleistocene Transition characterised by the continual prolonging of dry cycles and subsequent retreat of such habitat.

== Taxonomy ==
=== Research history ===
==== Discovery ====
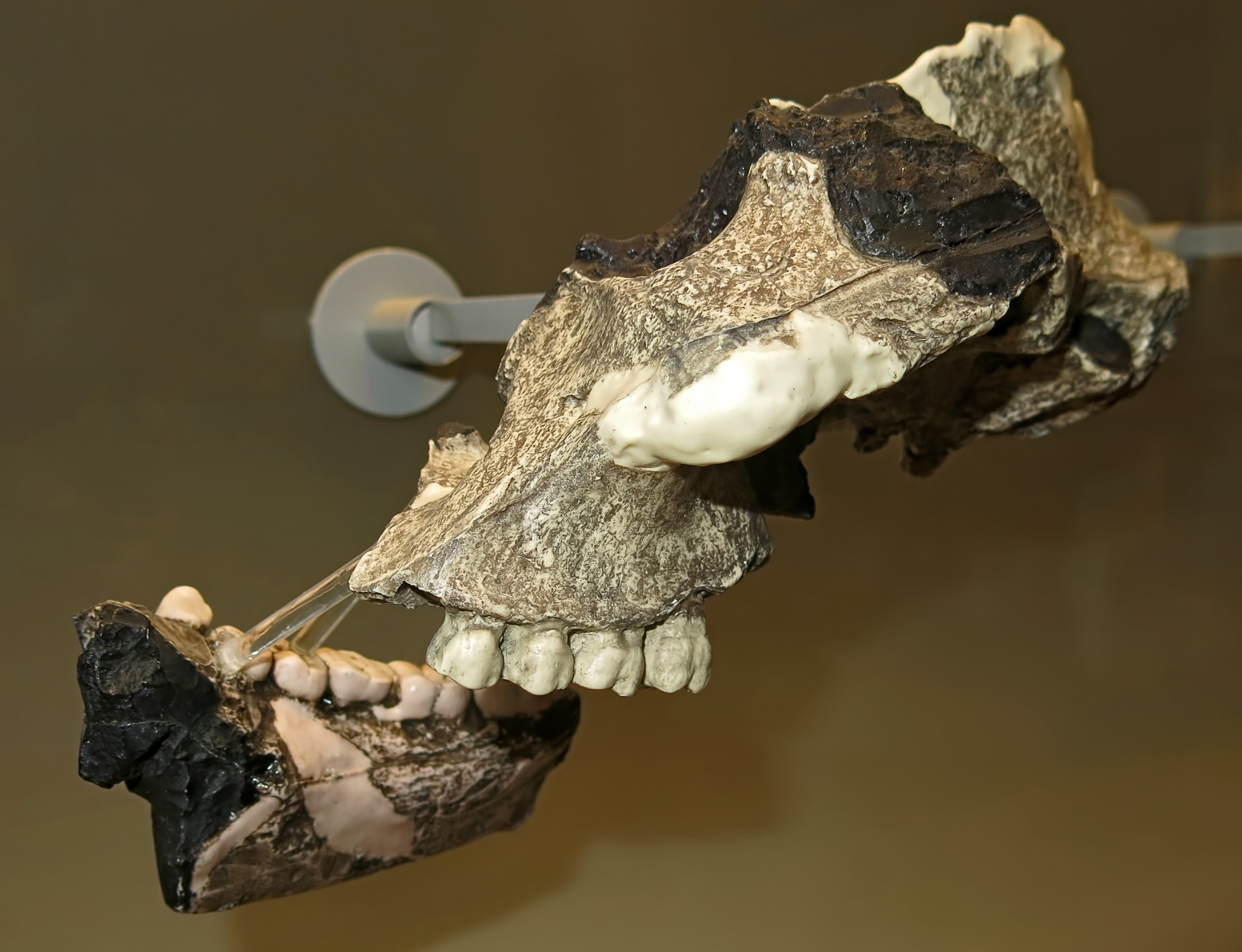
Cast of the face of TM 1517, the holotype specimen of P. robustus

The first remains, a partial skull including a part of the jawbone (TM 1517), were discovered in June 1938 at the Kromdraai cave site, South Africa, by local schoolboy Gert Terblanche. He gave the remains to South African conservationist Charles Sydney Barlow, who then relayed them to South African palaeontologist Robert Broom. Broom began investigating the site, and, a few weeks later, recovered a right distal humerus (the lower part of the upper arm bone), a proximal right ulna (upper part of a lower arm bone) and a distal phalanx bone of the big toe, all of which he assigned to TM 1517. He also identified a distal toe phalanx which he believed belonged to a baboon, but has since been associated with TM 1517. Broom noted the Kromdraai remains were especially robust compared to other hominins. In August 1938, Broom classified the robust Kromdraai remains into a new genus, as Paranthropus robustus. "Paranthropus" derives from the Ancient Greek παρα para, beside or alongside; and άνθρωπος ánthropos, man.

At this time, Australian anthropologist Raymond Dart had made the very first claim (quite controversially at the time) of an early ape-like human ancestor in 1924 from South Africa, Australopithecus africanus, based on the Taung child. In 1936, Broom had described "Plesianthropus transvaalensis" (now synonymised with A. africanus) from the Sterkfontein Caves only 2 km (1.2 mi) west from Kromdraai. All these species dated to the Pleistocene and were found in the same general vicinity (now called the "Cradle of Humankind"). Broom considered them evidence of a greater diversity of hominins in the Pliocene from which they and modern humans descended, and consistent with several hominin taxa existing alongside human ancestors.

The Kromdraai taxon, classified as Paranthropus robustus, was later discovered at the nearby Swartkrans Cave in 1948. P. robustus was only definitively identified at Kromdraai and Swartkrans until around the turn of the century when the species was reported elsewhere in the Cradle of Humankind at Sterkfontein, Gondolin, Cooper's, and Drimolen Caves. The species has not been found outside this small area.

==== "P. crassidens" ====
In 1948, at the nearby Swartkrans Cave, Broom described "P. crassidens" (distinct from P. robustus) based on a subadult jaw, SK 6, because Swartkrans and Kromdraai clearly dated to different time intervals based on the diverging animal assemblages in these caves. At this point in time, humans and allies were classified into the family Hominidae, and non-human great apes into "Pongidae"; in 1950, Broom suggested separating early hominins into the subfamilies Australopithecinae (Au. africanus and "Pl. transvaalensis"), "Paranthropinae" (Pa. robustus and "Pa. crassidens"), and "Archanthropinae" ("Au. prometheus"). This scheme was widely criticised for being too liberal in demarcating species. Further, the remains were not firmly dated, and it was debated if there were indeed multiple hominin lineages or if there was only a single one leading to humans. Most prominently, Broom and South African palaeontologist John Talbot Robinson continued arguing for the validity of Paranthropus.

Anthropologists Sherwood Washburn and Bruce D. Patterson were the first to recommend synonymising Paranthropus with Australopithecus in 1951, wanting to limit hominin genera to only that and Homo, and it has since been debated whether or not Paranthropus is a junior synonym of Australopithecus. In the spirit of tightening splitting criteria for hominin taxa, in 1954, Robinson suggested demoting "P. crassidens" to subspecies level as "P. r. crassidens", and also moved the Indonesian Meganthropus into the genus as "P. palaeojavanicus". Meganthropus has since been variously reclassified as a synonym of the Asian Homo erectus, "Pithecanthropus dubius", Pongo (orangutans), and so on, and in 2019 it was again argued to be a valid genus.

In 1949, also in Swartkrans Cave, Broom and Robinson found a mandible which they preliminary described as "intermediate between one of the ape-men and true man", classifying it as a new genus and species "Telanthropus capensis". Most immediate reactions favoured synonymising "T. capensis" with "P. crassidens", whose remains were already abundantly found in the cave. In 1957, though, Italian biologist Alberto Simonetta moved it to the genus "Pithecanthropus", and Robinson (without a specific reason why) decided to synonymise it with H. erectus (African H. erectus are sometimes called H. ergaster today). In 1965, South African palaeoanthropologist Phillip V. Tobias questioned whether this classification is completely sound or not.

By the 21st century, "P. crassidens" had more or less fallen out of use in favour of P. robustus. American palaeoanthropologist Frederick E. Grine is the primary opponent of synonymisation of the two species.

==== Gigantopithecus ====
In 1939, Broom hypothesised that P. robustus was closely related to the similarly large-toothed ape Gigantopithecus from Asia (extinct apes were primarily known from Asia at the time) believing Gigantopithecus to have been a hominin. Primarily influenced by the mid-century opinions of Jewish German anthropologist Franz Weidenreich and German-Dutch palaeontologist Ralph von Koenigswald that Gigantopithecus was, respectively, the direct ancestor of the Asian H. erectus or closely related, much debate followed over whether Gigantopithecus was a hominin or a non-human ape.

In 1972, Robinson suggested including Gigantopithecus in "Paranthropinae", with the Miocene Pakistani "G. bilaspurensis" (now Indopithecus) as the ancestor of Paranthropus and the Chinese G. blacki. He also believed that they both had a massive build. In contrast, he reported a very small build for A. africanus (which he referred to as "Homo" africanus) and speculated it had some cultural and hunting abilities, being a member of the human lineage, which "paranthropines" lacked. With the popularisation of cladistics by the late 1970s to 1980s, and better resolution on how Miocene apes relate to later apes, Gigantopithecus was entirely removed from Homininae, and is now placed in the subfamily Ponginae with orangutans.

==== P. boisei ====
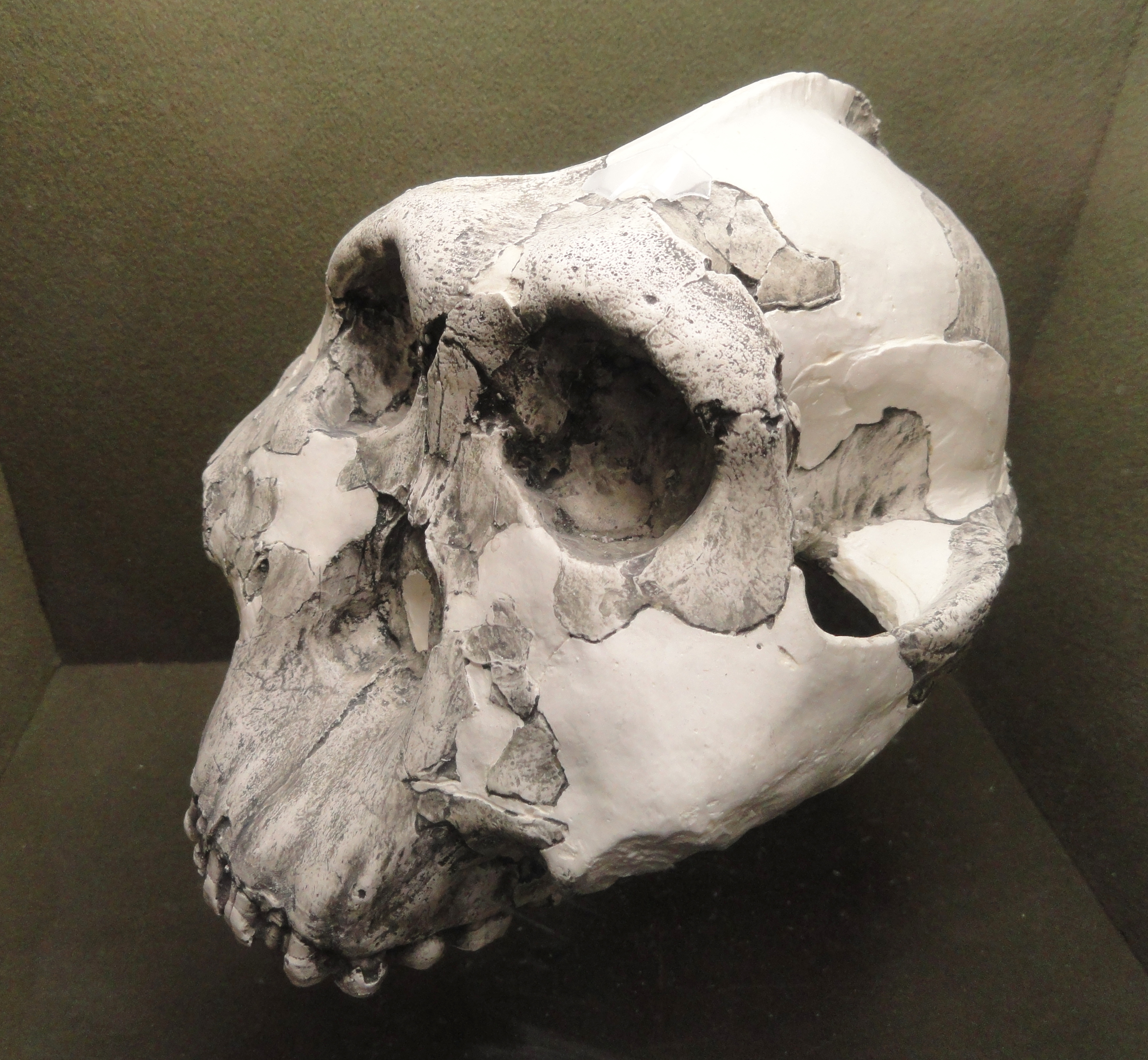
OH 5 (reconstructed skull above) was made the holotype specimen of the second Paranthropus species, P. boisei.

In 1959, another and much more robust australopithecine was discovered in East Africa, P. boisei, and in 1975, the P. boisei skull KNM-ER 406 was demonstrated to have been contemporaneous with the H. ergaster/H. erectus skull KNM ER 3733 (which is considered a human ancestor). This is generally taken to show that Paranthropus was a sister taxon to Homo, both developing from some Australopithecus species, which at the time only included A. africanus.

In 1979, a year after describing A. afarensis from East Africa, anthropologists Donald Johanson and Tim D. White suggested that A. afarensis was instead the last common ancestor between Homo and Paranthropus, and A. africanus was the earliest member of the Paranthropus lineage or at least was ancestral to P. robustus, because A. africanus inhabited South Africa before P. robustus, and A. afarensis was at the time the oldest known hominin species at roughly 3.5 million years old. Now, the earliest-known South African australopithecine ("Little Foot") dates to 3.67 million years ago, contemporaneous with A. afarensis. The matter is still debated.

It was long assumed that if Paranthropus is a valid genus then P. robustus was the ancestor of P. boisei, but in 1985, anthropologists Alan Walker and Richard Leakey found that the 2.5-million-year-old East African skull KNM WT 17000—which they assigned to a new species A. aethiopicus—was ancestral to A. boisei (they considered Paranthropus synonymous with Australopithecus), thus establishing the boisei lineage as beginning long before robustus had existed.

=== Classification ===
The genus Paranthropus (otherwise known as "robust australopithecines", in contrast to the "gracile australopithecines") now also includes the East African P. boisei and P. aethiopicus. It is still debated if this is a valid natural grouping (monophyletic) or an invalid grouping of similar-looking hominins (paraphyletic). Because skeletal elements are so limited in these species, their affinities with each other and with other australopithecines are difficult to gauge with accuracy. The jaws are the main argument for monophyly, but jaw anatomy is strongly influenced by diet and environment, and could have evolved independently in P. robustus and P. boisei. Proponents of monophyly consider P. aethiopicus to be ancestral to the other two species, or closely related to the ancestor. Proponents of paraphyly allocate these three species to the genus Australopithecus as A. boisei, A. aethiopicus, and A. robustus. In 2020, palaeoanthropologist Jesse M. Martin and colleagues' phylogenetic analyses reported the monophyly of Paranthropus, but also that P. robustus had branched off before P. aethiopicus (that P. aethiopicus was ancestral to only P. boisei). The exact classification of Australopithecus species with each other is quite contentious.

Monophyly

- - A. africanus
  - - P. aethiopicus
    - - P. boisei
      - P. robustus

Paraphyly

- - - A. africanus
    - P. robustus
  - - P. aethiopicus
    - P. boisei

Monophyly

- - A. africanus
  - - Homo
    - Kenyanthropus
    - - P. robustus
      - - P. aethiopicus
        - P. boisei

Three examples of family trees with P. robustus (note, they are not absolute)

In 2023, fragmentary genetic material belonging to this species was reported from 2 million year-old teeth, being the oldest genetic evidence to be retrieved from a human.

== Anatomy ==
=== Head ===
==== Skull ====
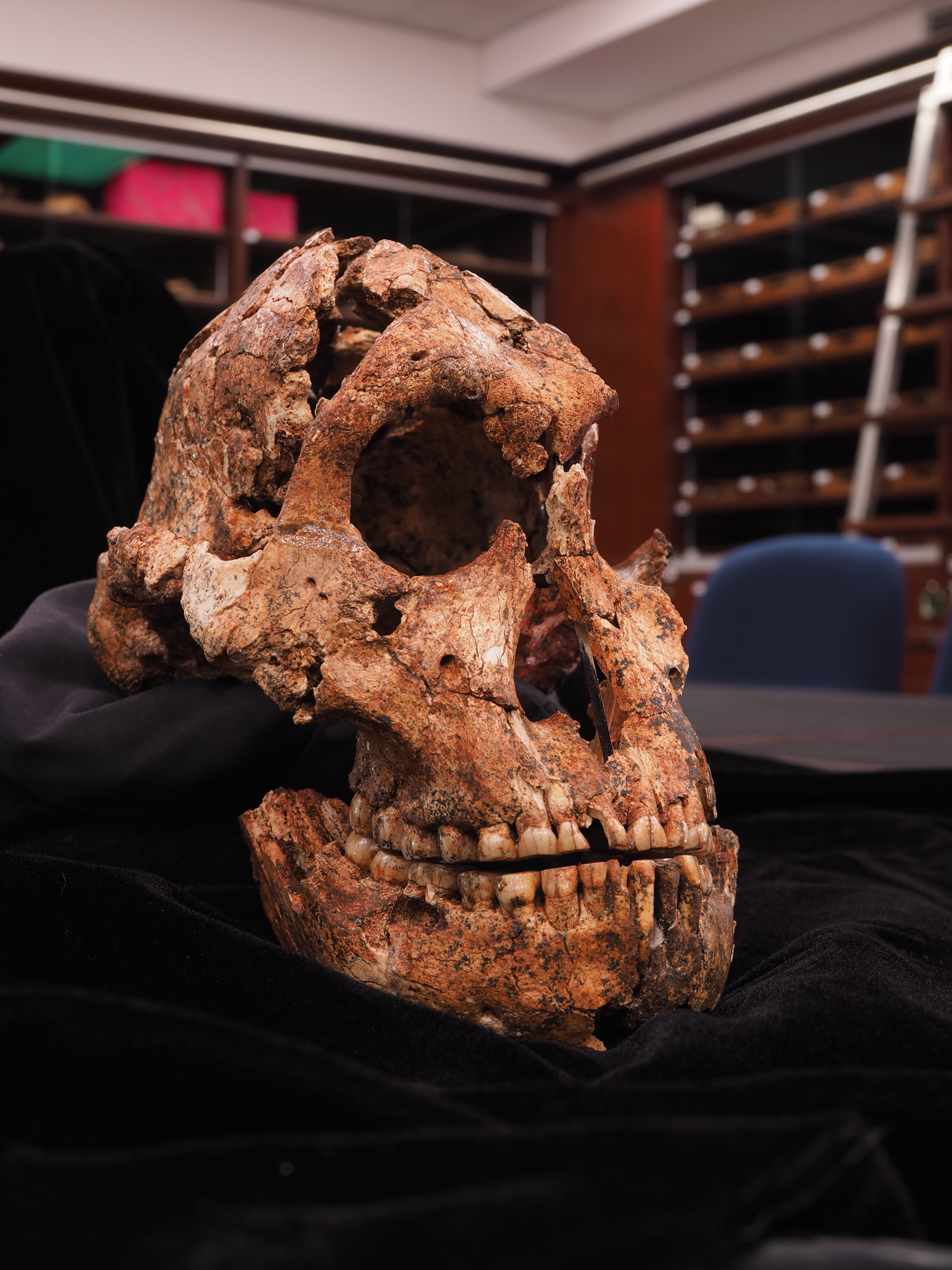
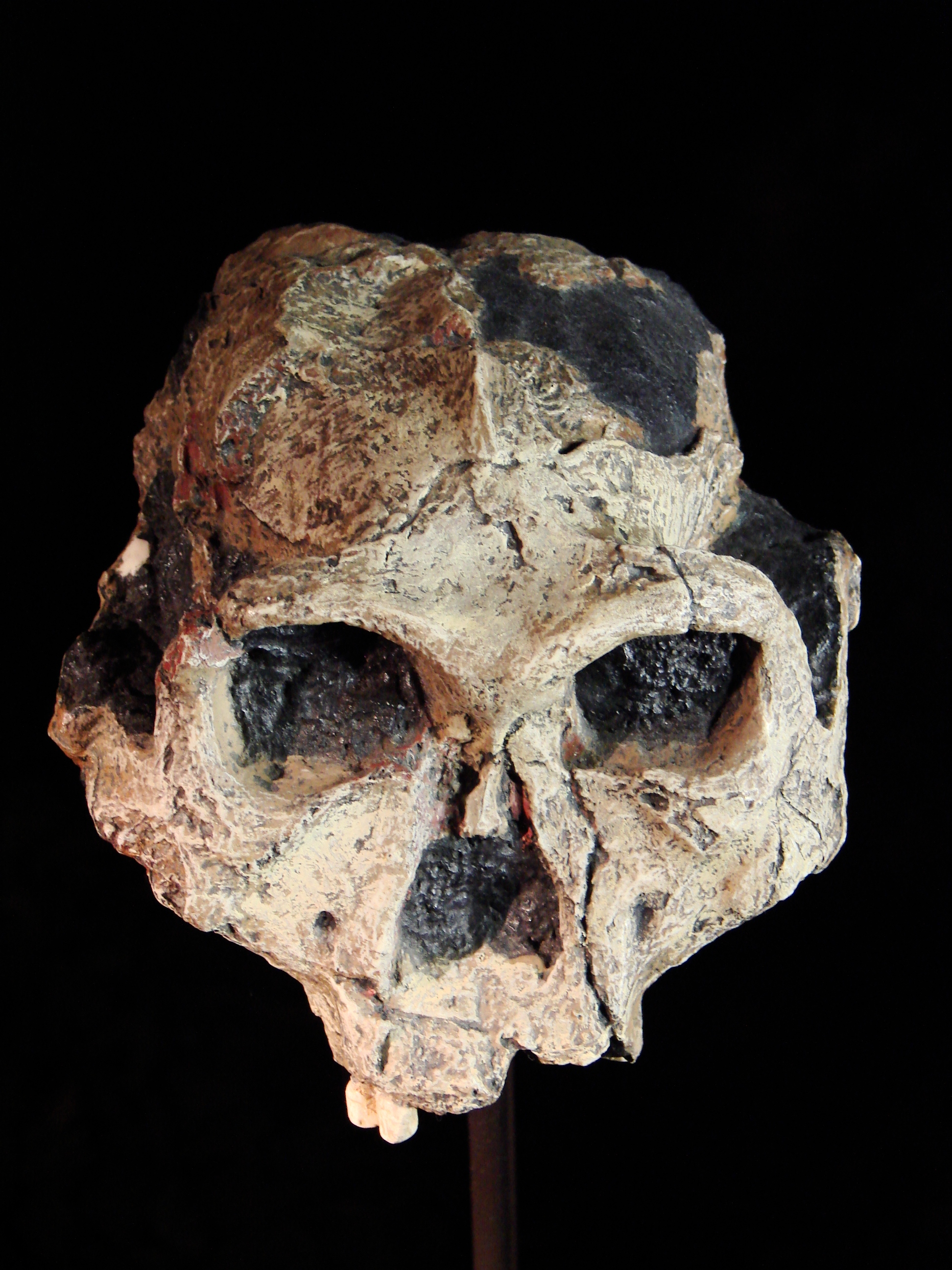
Female DNH 7 (left) and cast of male SK 48 (right) skulls

Typical of Paranthropus, P. robustus exhibits post-canine megadontia with enormous cheek teeth but human-sized incisors and canines. The premolars are shaped like molars. The enamel thickness on the cheek teeth is relatively on par with that of modern humans, though australopithecine cheek tooth enamel thickens especially at the tips of the cusps, whereas in humans it thickens at the base of the cusps.

P. robustus has a tall face with slight prognathism (the jaw jutted out somewhat). The skulls of males have a well-defined sagittal crest on the midline of the skullcap and inflated cheek bones, which likely supported massive temporal muscles important in biting. The cheeks project so far from the face that, when in top-view, the nose appears to sit at the bottom of a concavity (a dished face). This displaced the eye sockets forward somewhat, causing a weak brow ridge and receding forehead. The inflated cheeks also would have pushed the masseter muscle (important in biting down) forward and pushed the tooth rows back, which would have created a higher bite force on the premolars. The ramus of the jawbone, which connects the lower jaw to the upper jaw, is tall, which would have increased lever arm (and thereby, torque) of the masseter and medial pterygoid muscles (both important in biting down), further increasing bite force.

The well-defined sagittal crest and inflated cheeks are absent in the presumed-female skull DNH-7, so Keyser suggested that male P. robustus may have been more heavily built than females (P. robustus was sexually dimorphic). The Drimolen material, being more basal, is comparatively more gracile and consequently probably had a smaller bite force than the younger Swartkrans and Kromdraii P. robustus. The brows of the former also are rounded off rather than squared, and the sagittal crest of the presumed-male DNH 155 is more posteriorly (towards the back of the head) positioned.

The posterior semicircular canals in the inner ear of SK 46 and SK 47 are unlike those of the apelike Australopithecus or Homo, suggesting different locomotory and head movement patterns, since inner ear anatomy affects the vestibular system (sense of balance). The posterior semicircular canals of modern humans are thought to aid in stabilisation while running, which could mean P. robustus was not an endurance runner.

==== Brain ====
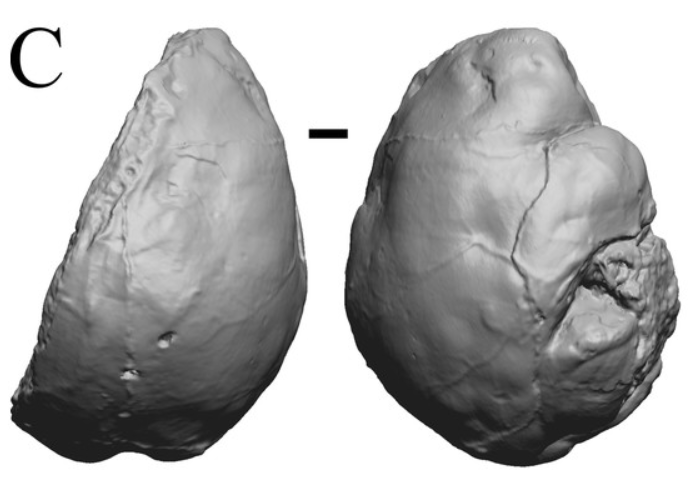
Partial endocast of Paranthropus robustus (SK1585).

Upon describing the species, Broom estimated the fragmentary braincase of TM 1517 as 600 cc, and he, along with South African anthropologist Gerrit Willem Hendrik Schepers, revised this to 575–680 cc in 1946. For comparison, the brain volume of contemporary Homo varied from 500 to 900 cc. A year later, British primatologist Wilfrid Le Gros Clark commented that, since only a part of the temporal bone on one side is known, brain volume cannot be accurately measured for this specimen. In 2001, Polish anthropologist Katarzyna Kaszycka said that Broom quite often artificially inflated brain size in early hominins, and the true value was probably much lower.

In 1972, American physical anthropologist Ralph Holloway measured the skullcap SK 1585, which is missing part of the frontal bone, and reported a volume of about 530 cc. He also noted that, compared to other australopithecines, Paranthropus seems to have had an expanded cerebellum like Homo, echoing what Tobias said while studying P. boisei skulls in 1967. In 2000, American neuroanthropologist Dean Falk and colleagues filled in frontal bone anatomy of SK 1585 using the P. boisei specimens KNM-ER 407, OH 5, and KNM-ER 732, and recalculated the brain volume to about 476 cc. They stated overall brain anatomy of P. robustus was more like that of non-human apes.

In 2020, the nearly complete skull DNH 155 was discovered and was measured to have had a brain volume of 450 cc.

==== Blood vessels ====
In 1983, while studying SK 1585 (P. robustus) and KNM-ER 407 (P. boisei, which he referred to as robustus), French anthropologist Roger Saban stated that the parietal branch of the middle meningeal artery originated from the posterior branch in P. robustus and P. boisei instead of the anterior branch as in earlier hominins, and considered this a derived characteristic due to increased brain capacity. It has since been demonstrated that, at least for P. boisei, the parietal branch could originate from either the anterior or posterior branches, sometimes both in a single specimen on opposite sides of the skull.

Regarding the dural venous sinuses, in 1983, Falk and anthropologist Glenn Conroy suggested that, unlike A. africanus or modern humans, all Paranthropus (and A. afarensis) had expanded occipital and marginal (around the foramen magnum) sinuses, completely supplanting the transverse and sigmoid sinuses. They suggested the setup would have increased blood flow to the internal vertebral venous plexuses or internal jugular vein, and was thus related to the reorganisation of the blood vessels supplying the head as an immediate response to bipedalism, which relaxed as bipedalism became more developed. In 1988, Falk and Tobias demonstrated that early hominins (at least A. africanus and P. boisei) could have both an occipital/marginal and transverse/sigmoid systems concurrently or on opposite halves of the skull.

=== Torso ===
Few vertebrae are assigned to P. robustus. The only thoracolumbar series (thoracic and lumbar series) preserved belongs to the juvenile SKW 14002, and either represents the 1st to the 4th lumbar vertebrae, or the 2nd to the 5th. SK 3981 preserves a 12th thoracic vertebra (the last in the series), and a lower lumbar vertebra. The 12th thoracic vertebra is relatively elongated, and the articular surface (where it joins with another vertebra) is kidney-shaped. The T12 is more compressed in height than that of other australopithecines and modern apes. Modern humans who suffer from spinal disc herniation often have vertebrae that are more similar to those of chimpanzees than healthy humans. Early hominin vertebrae are similar to those of a pathological human, including the only other 12th thoracic vertebra known for P. robustus, the juvenile SK 853. Conversely, SK 3981 is more similar to those of healthy humans, which could be explained as: SK 3981 is abnormal, the vertebrae took on a more humanlike condition with maturity, or one of these specimens is assigned to the wrong species. The shape of the lumbar vertebrae is much more similar to that of Turkana Boy (H. ergaster/H. erectus) and humans than other australopithecines. The pedicles (which jut out diagonally from the vertebra) of the lower lumbar vertebra are much more robust than in other australopithecines and are within the range of humans, and the transverse processes (which jut out to the sides of the vertebra) indicate powerful iliolumbar ligaments. These could have bearing on the amount of time spent upright compared to other australopithecines.

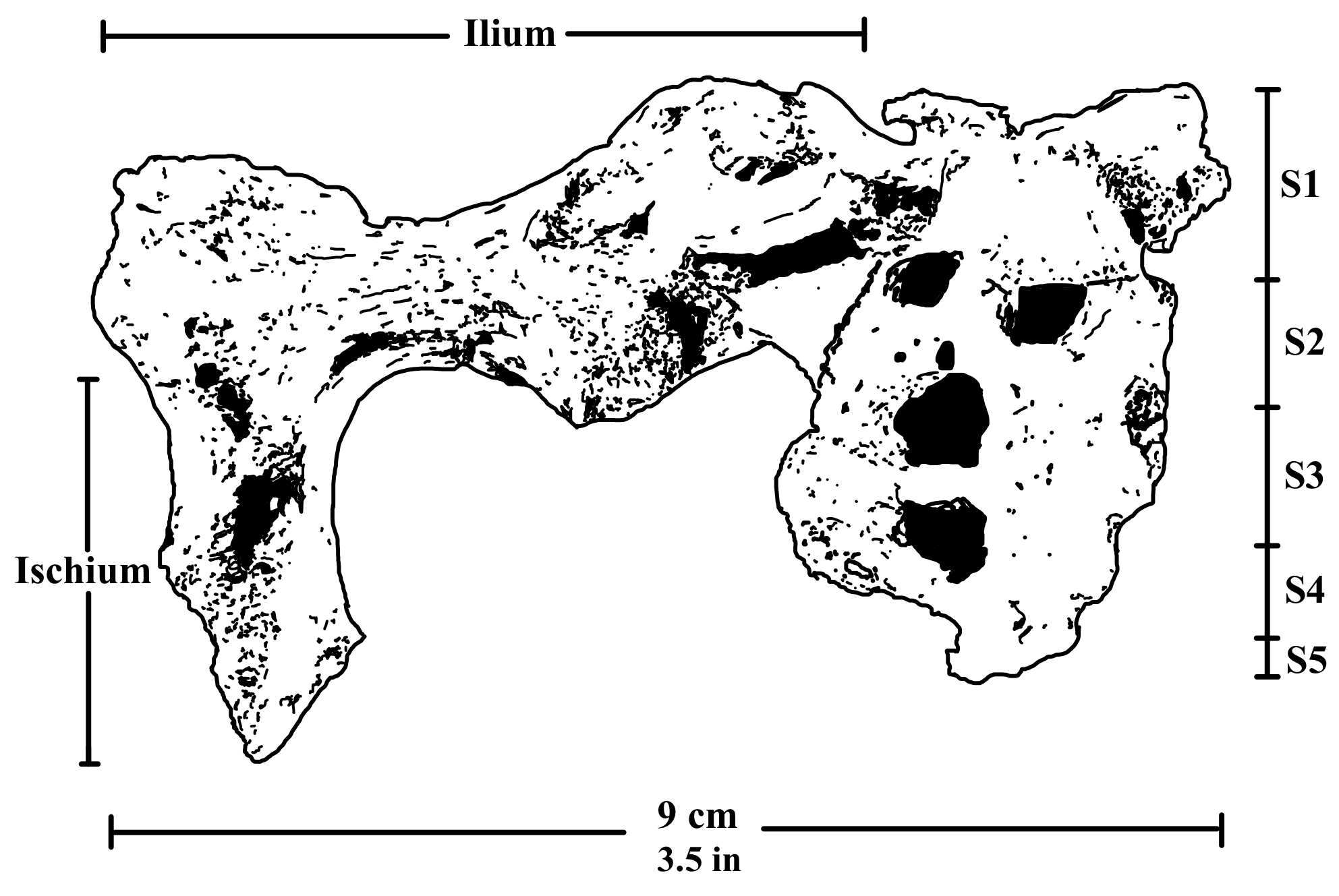
Illustration of the pelvis of DNH 43 (front view)

The pelvis is similar to the pelvises of A. africanus and A. afarensis, but it has a wider iliac blade and smaller acetabulum and hip joint. Like modern humans, the ilium of P. robustus features development of the surface and thickening of the posterior superior iliac spine, which are important in stabilising the sacrum, and indicates lumbar lordosis (curvature of the lumbar vertebrae) and thus bipedalism. The anatomy of the sacrum and the first lumbar vertebra (at least the vertebral arch), preserved in DNH 43, are similar to those of other australopithecines. The pelvis seems to indicate a more-or-less humanlike hip joint consistent with bipedalism, though differences in overall pelvic anatomy may indicate P. robustus used different muscles to generate force and perhaps had a different mechanism to direct force up the spine. This is similar to the condition seen in A. africanus. This could potentially indicate the lower limbs had a wider range of motion than those of modern humans.

=== Limbs ===
The distal (lower) humerus of P. robustus falls within the variation of both modern humans and chimps, as the distal humerus is quite similar between humans and chimpanzees. The radius of P. robustus is comparable in form to Australopithecus species. The wrist joint had the same maneuverability as that of modern humans rather than the greater flexion achieved by non-human apes, but the head of radius (the elbow) seems to have been quite capable of maintaining stability when the forearm was flexed like non-human apes. It is possible this reflects some arboreal activity (movement in the trees) as is controversially postulated in other australopithecines. SKX 3602 exhibits robust radial styloid processes near the hand which indicate strong brachioradialis muscles and extensor retinaculae. Like humans, the finger bones are uncurved and have weaker muscle attachment than non-human apes, though the proximal phalanges are smaller than in humans. The intermediate phalanges are stout and straight like humans, but have stouter bases and better developed flexor impressions. The distal phalanges seem to be essentially humanlike. These could indicate a decreased climbing capacity compared to non-human apes and P. boisei. The P. robustus hand is consistent with a humanlike precision grip, which would have made possible the production or usage of tools requiring greater motor functions than non-human primate tools.

The femur, as in P. boisei and H. habilis, is flattened anteroposteriorly (on the front and back side). This may indicate a walking gait more similar to early hominins than to modern humans (less efficient gait). Four femora assigned to P. robustus—SK 19, SK 82, SK 97, and SK 3121—exhibit an apparently high anisotropic trabecular bone (at the hip joint) structure, which could indicate reduced mobility of the hip joint compared to non-human apes, and the ability to produce forces consistent with humanlike bipedalism. The femoral head StW 311, which either belongs to P. robustus or early Homo, seems to have habitually been placed in highly flexed positions based on the wearing patterns, which would be consistent with frequent climbing activity. It is unclear if frequent squatting could be a valid alternative interpretation. The textural complexity of the kneecap SKX 1084, which reflects cartilage thickness and thus usage of the knee joint and bipedality, is midway between modern humans and chimps. The big toe bone of P. robustus is not dextrous, which indicates a humanlike foot posture and range of motion, but the more distal ankle joint would have inhibited the modern human toe-off gait cycle. P. robustus and H. habilis may have achieved about the same grade of bipedality.

=== Size ===
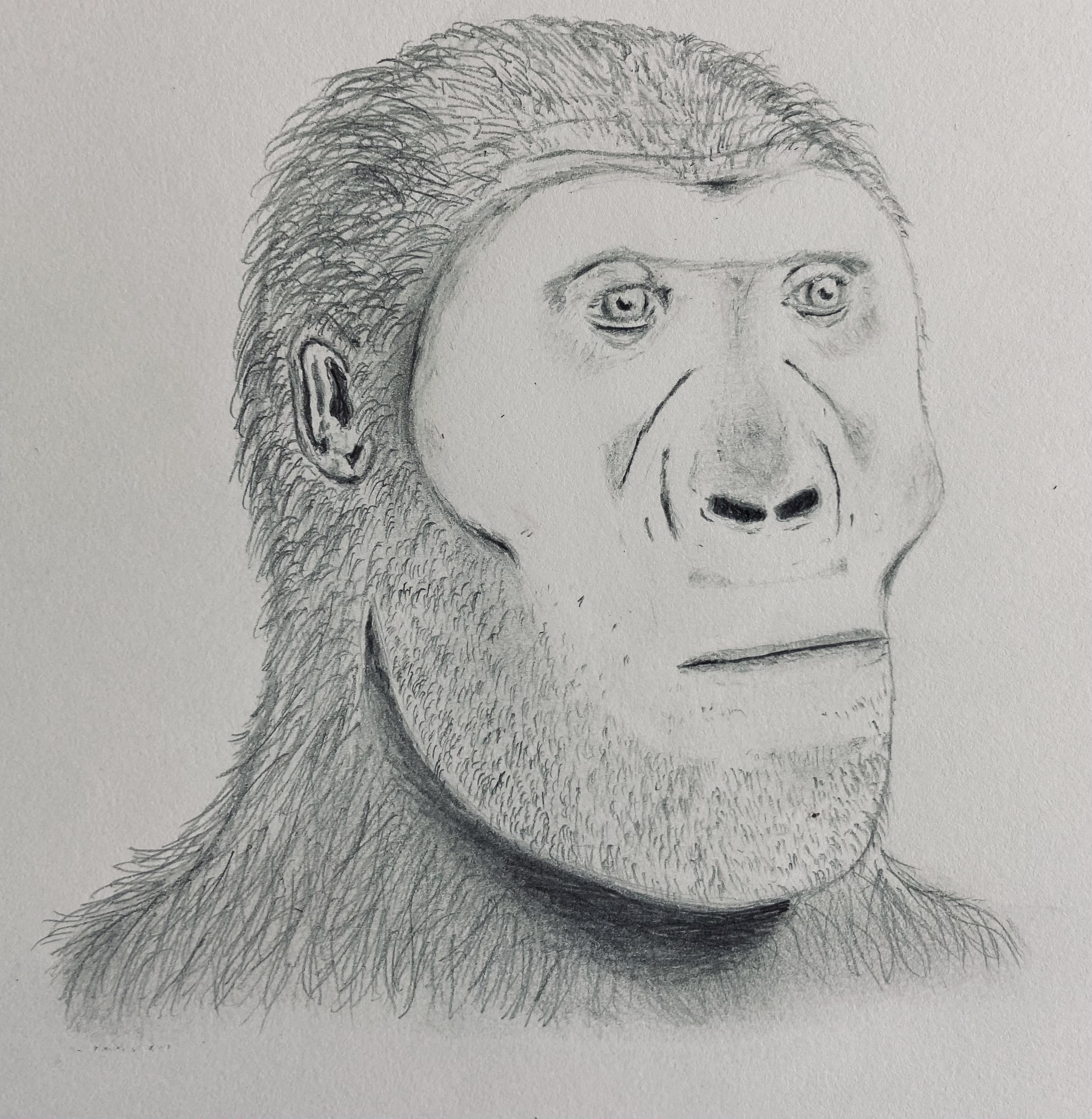
Reconstruction of a female P. robustus

Broom had noted that the ankle bone and humerus of the holotype TM 1517 were about the same dimensions as that of a modern San woman, and so assumed humanlike proportions in P. robustus. In 1972, Robinson estimated Paranthropus as having been massive. He calculated the humerus-to-femur ratio of P. robustus by using the presumed female humerus of STS 7 and comparing it with the presumed male femur of STS 14. He also had to estimate the length of the humerus using the femur assuming a similar degree of sexual dimorphism between P. robustus and humans. Comparing the ratio to humans, he concluded that P. robustus was a heavily built species with a height of 140–150 cm (4 ft 7 in – 4 ft 11 in) and a weight of 68–91 kg (150–201 lb). Consequently, Robinson had described its locomotory habits as, "a compromise between erectness and facility for quadrupedal climbing." In contrast, he estimated A. africanus (which he called "H." africanus) to have been 1.2–1.4 m (4–4.5 ft) tall and 18–27 kg (40–60 lb) in weight, and to have also been completely bipedal.

Robinson's estimation of P. robustus size was soon challenged in 1974 by American palaeontologist Stephen Jay Gould and English palaeoanthropologist David Pilbeam, who guessed from the available skeletal elements a weight of about 40.5 kg (89 lb). Similarly, in 1988, American anthropologist Henry McHenry reported much lighter weights as well as notable sexual dimorphism for Paranthropus. McHenry plotted body size vs. the cross sectional area of the femoral head for a sample of just humans and a sample with all great apes including humans, and calculated linear regressions for each one. Based on the average of these two regressions, he reported an average weight of 47.1 kg (104 lb) for P. robustus using the specimens SK 82 and SK 97. In 1991, McHenry expanded his sample size, and also estimated the living size of Swartkrans specimens by scaling down the dimensions of an average modern human to meet a preserved leg or foot element (he considered the arm measurements too variable among hominins to give accurate estimates). At Members 1 and 2, about 35% of the P. robustus leg or foot specimens were the same size as those in a 28 kg (62 lb) human, 22% in a 43 kg (95 lb) human, and the remaining 43% bigger than the former but less than a 54 kg (119 lb) human except for KNM‐ER 1464 (an ankle bone). At Member 3, all individuals were consistent with a 45 kg (99 lb) human. Smaller adults thus seem to have been more common. McHenry also estimated the living height of three P. robustus specimens (male SK 82, male SK 97, and female or subadult SK 3155), by scaling down an average human to meet the estimated size of the preserved femur, as 126 cm (4 ft 2 in), 137 cm (4 ft 6 in), and 110 cm (3 ft 7 in), respectively. Based on just these three, he reported an average height of 132 cm (4 ft 4 in) for P. robustus males and 110 cm (3 ft 7 in) for females.

In 2001, palaeoanthropologist Randall L. Susman and colleagues, using two recently discovered proximal femoral fragments from Swartkrans, estimated an average of 42 kg (93 lb) for males and 30 kg (66 lb) for females. If these four proximal femur specimens—SK 82, SK 97, SKW 19, and SK 3121—are representative of the entire species, they said that this degree of sexual dimorphism is greater than what is exhibited in humans and chimpanzees, but less than orangutans and gorillas. Female P. robustus were about the same estimated weight as female H. ergaster/H. erectus in Swartkrans, but they estimated male H. ergaster/H. erectus as much bigger at 55 kg (121 lb). In 2012, American anthropologist Trenton Holliday, using the same equation as McHenry on three specimens, reported an average of 37 kg (82 lb) with a range of 30–43 kg (66–95 lb). In 2015, biological anthropologist Mark Grabowski and colleagues, using nine specimens, estimated an average of 32.3 kg (71 lb) for males and 24 kg (53 lb) for females.

== Palaeobiology ==
=== Diet ===
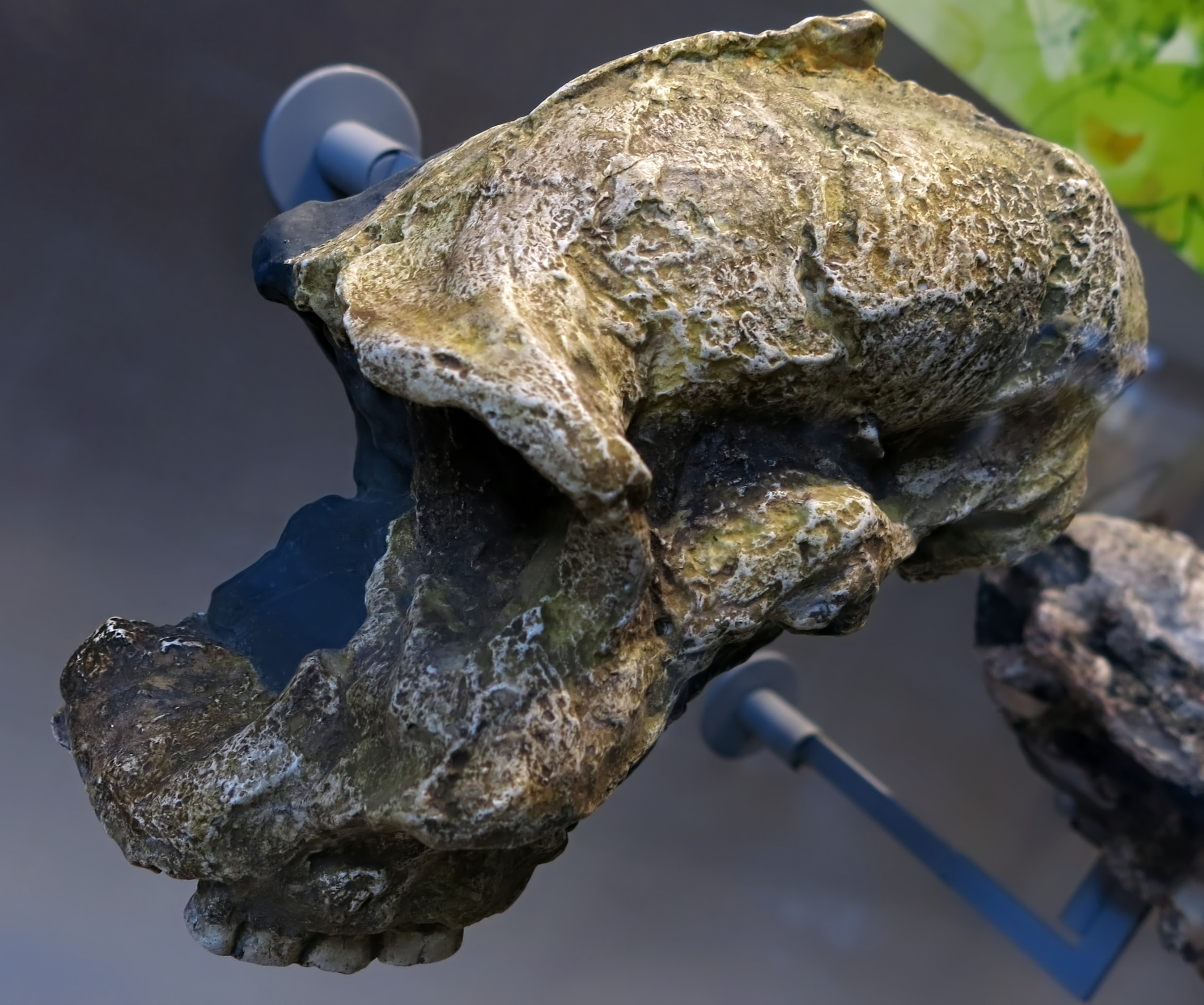
Cast of SK 46 skull

In 1954, Robinson suggested that the heavily built skull of P. robustus and resultantly exorbitant bite force was indicative of a specialist diet adapted for frequently cracking hard foods such as nuts. Because of this, the predominant model of Paranthropus extinction for the latter half of the 20th century was that they were unable to adapt to the volatile climate of the Pleistocene, unlike the much more adaptable Homo. Subsequent researchers reinforced this model studying the musculature of the face, dental wearing patterns, and primate ecology. In 1981, English anthropologist Alan Walker, while studying the P. boisei skulls KNM-ER 406 and 729, pointed out that bite force is a measure of not only the total pressure exerted but also the surface area of the tooth over which the pressure is being exerted, and Paranthropus teeth are 4–5 times the size of modern human teeth. Because the chewing muscles are arranged the same way, Walker postulated that the heavy build was instead an adaptation to chew a large quantity of food at the same time. He also found that microwearing on 20 P. boisei molar specimens were indistinguishable from patterning recorded in mandrills, chimps, and orangutans. Despite subsequent arguments that Paranthropus were not specialist feeders, the predominant consensus in favour of Robinson's initial model did not change for the remainder of the 20th century.

In 2004, in their review of Paranthropus dietary literature, anthropologists Bernard Wood and David Strait concluded that Paranthropus were most definitely generalist feeders, and that P. robustus was an omnivore. They found that the microwear patterns in P. robustus suggest hard food was infrequently consumed, and therefore the heavy build of the skull was only relevant when eating less desirable fallback foods. Such a strategy is similar to that used by modern gorillas, which can sustain themselves entirely on lower quality fallback foods year-round, as opposed to lighter built chimpanzees (and presumably gracile australopithecines), which require steady access to high quality foods. In 1980, anthropologists Tom Hatley and John Kappelman suggested that early hominins (convergently with bears and pigs) adapted to eating abrasive and calorie-rich underground storage organs (USOs), such as roots and tubers. Since then, hominin exploitation of USOs has gained more support. In 2005, biological anthropologists Greg Laden and Richard Wrangham proposed that Paranthropus relied on USOs as a fallback or possibly primary food source, and noted that there may be a correlation between high USO abundance and hominin occupation.

A 2006 carbon isotope analysis suggested that P. robustus subsisted on mainly C_{4} savanna plants or C_{3} forest plants depending on the season, which could indicate either seasonal shifts in diet or seasonal migration from forest to savanna. H. ergaster/H. erectus appears to have consumed about the same proportion of C_{3} to C_{4} based foods as P. robustus. P. robustus likely also commonly cracked hard foods such as seeds or nuts, as it had a moderate tooth-chipping rate (about 12% in a sample of 239 individuals, as opposed to little to none for P. boisei). A high cavity rate could indicate honey consumption. Juvenile P. robustus may have relied more on tubers than adults, given the elevated levels of strontium compared to adults in teeth from Swartkrans Cave, which, in the area, was most likely sourced from tubers. Dentin exposure on juvenile teeth could indicate early weaning, or a more abrasive diet than adults which wore away the cementum and enamel coatings, or both. It is also possible juveniles were instead less capable of removing grit from dug-up food rather than purposefully seeking out more abrasive foods.

=== Social structure ===
Given the marked anatomical and physical differences with modern great apes, there may be no modern analogue for australopithecine societies, so comparisons drawn with modern primates are highly speculative.

In 2007, anthropologist Charles Lockwood and colleagues pointed out that P. robustus appears to have had pronounced sexual dimorphism, with males notably larger than females. This is commonly correlated with a male-dominated polygamous society, such as the harem society of modern forest-dwelling silverback gorillas where one male has exclusive breeding rights to a group of females. Estimated male-female size disparity in P. robustus is comparable to gorillas (based on facial dimensions), and younger males were less robust than older males (delayed maturity is also exhibited in gorillas). Because the majority of sexed P. robustus specimens are male (or at least presumed male), males seem to have had a higher mortality rate than females. In a harem society, males are more likely to be evicted from the group given higher male–male competition over females, and lone males may have been put at a higher risk of predation. By this hypothesis, a female moving out of her birth group may have spent little time alone and transferred immediately to another established group.

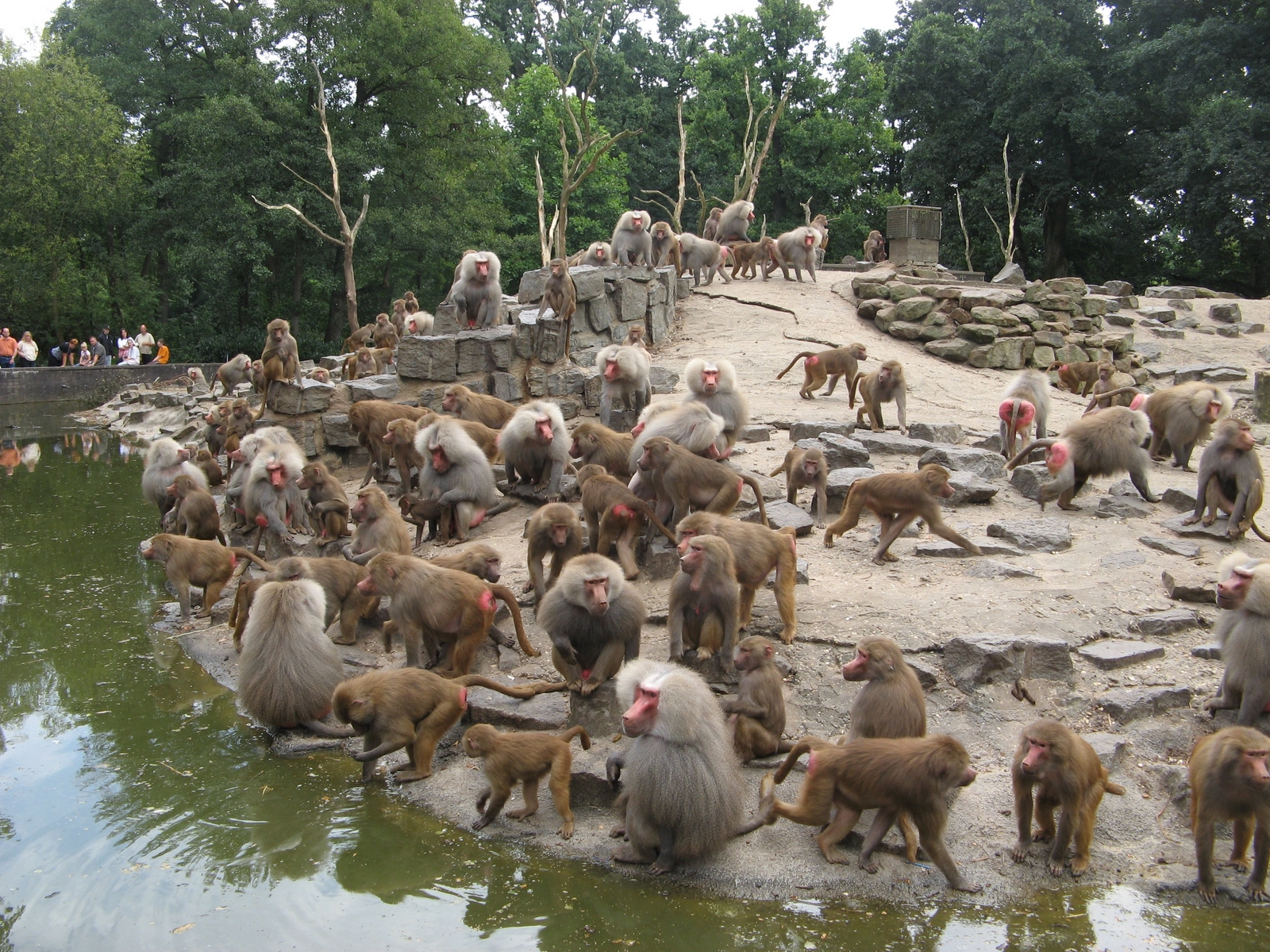
P. robustus could have lived in multi-male groups like Hamadryas baboons (above troop at Dierenpark Emmen).

However, in 2011, palaeoanthropologist Sandi Copeland and colleagues studied the strontium isotope ratio of P. robustus teeth from the dolomite Sterkfontein Valley, and found that like other hominins, but unlike other great apes, P. robustus females were more likely to leave their place of birth (patrilocal). This discounts the plausibility of a harem society, which would have resulted in a matrilocal society due to heightened male–male competition. Males did not seem to have ventured very far from the valley, which could either indicate small home ranges, or that they preferred dolomitic landscapes due to perhaps cave abundance or factors related to vegetation growth. Similarly, in 2016, Polish anthropologist Katarzyna Kaszycka rebutted that, among primates, delayed maturity is also exhibited in the rhesus monkey which has a multi-male society, and may not be an accurate indicator of social structure. If P. robustus preferred a savanna habitat, a multi-male society would have been more conducive in defending the troop from predators in the more exposed environment, much like baboons which live in the savanna. Even in a multi-male society, it is still possible that males were more likely to be evicted, explaining male-skewed mortality with the same mechanism.

In 2017, anthropologist Katharine Balolia and colleagues postulated that, because male non-human great apes have a larger sagittal crest than females (particularly gorillas and orangutans), the crest may be influenced by sexual selection in addition to supporting chewing muscles. Further, the size of the sagittal crest (and the gluteus muscles) in male western lowland gorillas has been correlated with reproductive success. Balolia et al. extended their interpretation of the crest to the males of Paranthropus species, with the crest and resultantly larger head (at least in P. boisei) being used for some kind of display. This contrasts with other primates which flash the typically enlarged canines in agonistic display (Paranthropus likely did not do this as the canines are comparatively small), though it is also possible that the crest is only so prominent in male gorillas and orangutans because they require larger temporalis muscles to achieve a wider gape to better display the canines.

=== Technology ===
Cave sites in the Cradle of Humankind often have stone and bone tools, with the former attributed to early Homo and the latter generally to P. robustus, as bone tools are most abundant when P. robustus remains far outnumber Homo remains. Australopithecine bone technology was first proposed by Dart in the 1950s with what he termed the "osteodontokeratic culture", which he attributed to A. africanus at Makapansgat dating to 3–2.6 million years ago. These bones are no longer considered to have been tools, and the existence of this culture is not supported. The first probable bone tool was reported by Robinson in 1959 at Sterkfontein Member 5. Excavations led by South African palaeontologist Charles Kimberlin Brain at Swartkrans in the late 1980s and early 1990s recovered 84 similar bone tools, and excavations led by Keyser at Drimolen recovered 23. These tools were all found alongside Acheulean stone tools, except for those from Swartkrans Member 1 which bore Oldowan stone tools. Thus, there are 108 bone tool specimens from the region in total, and possibly an additional two from Kromdraai B. The two stone tools (either "Developed Oldowan" or "Early Acheulean") from Kromdraai B could possibly be attributed to P. robustus, as Homo has not been confidently identified in this layer, though it is possible that the stone tools were reworked (moved into the layer after the inhabitants had died). Bone tools may have been used to cut or process vegetation, process fruits (namely marula fruit), strip tree bark, or dig up tubers or termites. The form of P. robustus incisors appears to be intermediate between H. erectus and modern humans, which could possibly mean it did not have to regularly bite off mouthfuls of a large food item due to preparation with simple tools. The bone tools were typically sourced from the shaft of long bones from medium- to large-sized mammals, but tools sourced from mandibles, ribs, and horn cores have also been found. They were not manufactured or purposefully shaped for a task, but since they display no weathering, and there is a preference displayed for certain bones, raw materials were likely specifically hand picked. This contrasts with East African bone tools which appear to have been modified and directly cut into specific shapes before using.

In 1988, Brain and South African archaeologist A. Sillent analysed the 59,488 bone fragments from Swartkrans Member 3, and found that 270 had been burnt, mainly belonging to medium-sized antelope, but also zebra, warthog, baboon, and P. robustus. They were found across the entire depth of Member 3, so fire was a regular event throughout its deposition. Based on colour and structural changes, they found that 46 were heated to below 300 °C (572 °F), 52 to 300–400 °C (572–752 °F), 45 to 400–500 °C (752–932 °F), and 127 above this. They concluded that these bones were, "the earliest direct evidence of fire use in the fossil record", and compared the temperatures with those achieved by experimental campfires burning white stinkwood which commonly grows near the cave. Though some bones had cut marks consistent with butchery, they said it was also possible hominins were making fire to scare away predators or for warmth instead of cooking. Because both P. robustus and H. ergaster/H. erectus were found in the cave, they were unsure which species to attribute the fire to. As an alternative to hominin activity, because the bones were not burnt inside the cave, it is possible that they were naturally burnt in cyclically occurring wildfires (dry savanna grass as well as possible guano or plant accumulation in the cave may have left it susceptible to such a scenario), and then washed into what would become Member 3. The now-earliest claim of fire usage is 1.7 million years ago at Wonderwerk Cave, South Africa, made by South African archaeologist Peter Beaumont in 2011, which he attributed to H. ergaster/H. erectus.

=== Development ===
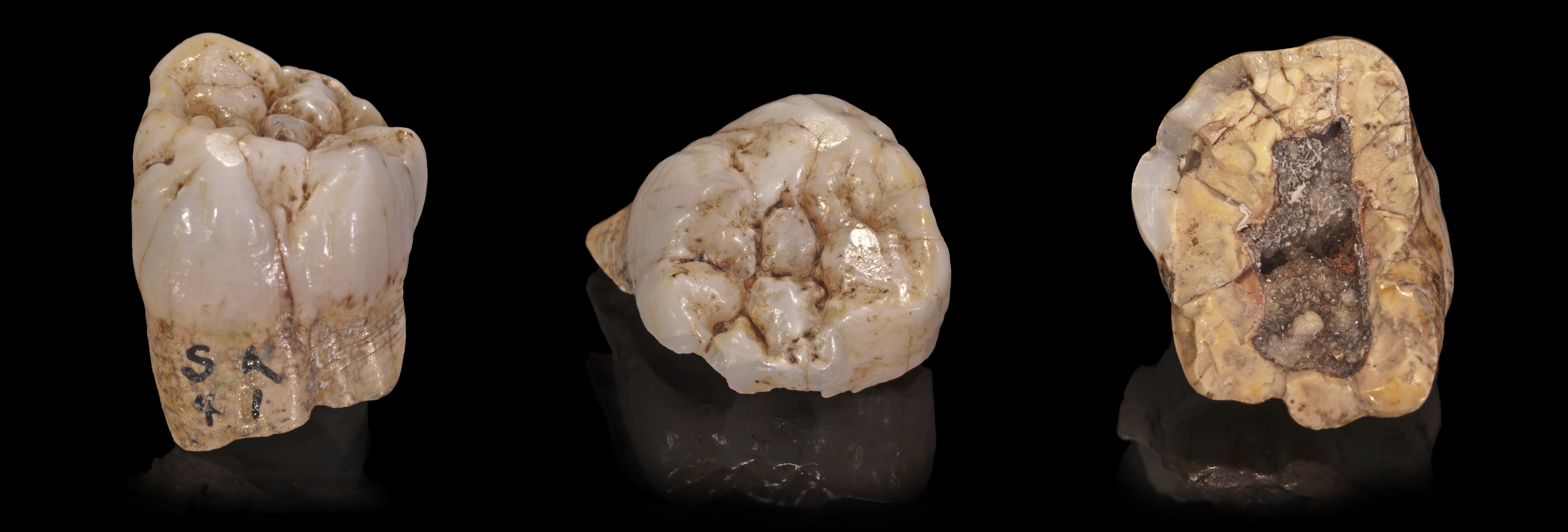
SKX 11 tooth

Australopithecines are generally considered to have had a faster, apelike growth rate than modern humans largely due to dental development trends. Broadly speaking, the emergence of the first permanent molar in early hominins has been variously estimated anywhere from 2.5 to 4.5 years, which all contrast markedly with the modern human average of 5.8 years. The 1st permanent molar of SK 63, which may have died at 3.4–3.7 years of age, possibly erupted at 2.9–3.2 years. In modern apes (including humans), dental development trajectory is strongly correlated with life history and overall growth rate, but it is possible that early hominins simply had a faster dental trajectory but a slower life history due to environmental factors, such as early weaning age as is exemplified in modern indriid lemurs. In TM 1517, fusion of the elements of the distal humerus (at the elbow joint) occurred before the fusion of the elements in the distal big toe phalanx, much like in chimps and bonobos, but unlike humans, which could also indicate an apelike growth trajectory.

While growing, the front part of the jaw in P. robustus is depository (so it grows) whereas the sides are resorptive (so they recede). For comparison, chimp jaws are generally depository reflecting prognathism, and modern humans resorptive reflecting a flat face. In Paranthropus, this may have functioned to thicken the palate. Unlike other apes and gracile australopithecines, but like humans, the premaxillary suture between the premaxilla and the maxilla (on the palate) formed early in development. At early stages, the P. robustus jawbone was somewhat similar to that of modern humans, but the breadth grew in P. robustus, as to be expected from its incredible robustness in adulthood. By the time the first permanent molar erupts, the body of the mandible and the front jaw broadened, and the ramus of the mandible elongated, diverging from the modern human trajectory. Because the ramus was so tall, it is suggested that P. robustus experienced more anterior face rotation than modern humans and apes. Growth was most marked between the eruptions of the first and second permanent molars, most notably in terms of the distance from the back of the mouth to the front of the mouth, probably to make room for the massive postcanine teeth. Like humans, jaw robustness decreased with age, though it decreased slower in P. robustus. Regardless if P. robustus followed a human or non-human ape dental development timeframe, the premolars and molars would have had an accelerated growth rate to achieve their massive size. In contrast, the presence of perikymata on the incisors and canines (growth lines which typically are worn away after eruption) could indicate these teeth had a reduced growth rate. The tooth roots of P. robustus molars may have grown at a faster rate than gracile australopithecines; the root length of SK 62's 1st molar, which was reaching emergence from the dental alveolus, is about 6 mm (0.24 in). In contrast, those of other hominins reach 5–6 mm (0.20–0.24 in) after the tooth has emerged not only from the gums (a later stage of dental development). SK 62's growth trajectory is more similar to that of gorillas, whose roots typically measure 7 mm (0.28 in) when emerging from the gums.

Females may have reached skeletal maturity by the time the third molar erupted, but males appear to have continued growing after reaching dental maturity, during which time they become markedly more robust than females (sexual bimaturism). Similarly, male gorillas complete dental development about the same time as females, but continue growing for up to 5 or 6 years; and male mandrills complete dental development before females, but continue growing for several years more. It is debated whether or not P. robustus had a defined growth spurt in terms of overall height during adolescence, an event unique to humans among modern apes.

=== Life history ===
In 1968, American anthropologist Alan Mann, using dental maturity, stratified P. robustus specimens from Swartkrans into different ages, and found an average of 17.2 years at death (they did not necessarily die from old age), and the oldest specimen was 30–35 years old. He also reported an average of 22.2 years for A. africanus. Using these, he argued these hominins had a humanlike prolonged childhood. In response, in 1971, biologist Kelton McKinley repeated Mann's process with more specimens, and (including P. boisei) reported an average of 18 years. McKinley agreed with Mann that P. robustus may have had a prolonged childhood. McKinley also speculated that sexual maturity was reached at approximately 11 years because it is about halfway between the averages for chimps (9 years) and humans (13). Based on this, he concluded babies were birthed at intervals of 3 to 4 years using a statistical test to maximise the number of children born.

In 1972, after estimating a foetal size of 1,230–1,390 g (2.7–3.1 lb) based on an adult female weight of 50 kg (110 lb), anthropologist Walter Leutenegger estimated foetal head size at about 110–160 cc (6.7–9.8 cu in), similar to a chimp. In 1973, using this and an equation between foetal head size and gestation (assuming foetal growth rate of 0.6 for all mammals), biologist John Frazer estimated a gestation of 300 days for P. robustus. In response, Leutenegger pointed out that apes have highly variable foetal growth rates, and "estimates on gestation periods based on this rate and birth weight are useless."

In 1985, British biologists Paul H. Harvey and Tim Clutton-Brock came up with equations relating body size to life history events for primates, which McHenry applied to australopithecines in 1994. For P. robustus, he reported newborn brain size of 175 cc and weight of 1.9 kg (4.2 lb), gestation 7.6 months, weaning after 30.1 months of age, maturation age 9.7 years, breeding age 11.4 years, birth interval 45 months, and lifespan 43.3 years. These roughly aligned with other australopithecines and chimps. However, for chimps, he got strongly inaccurate results when compared to actual data for newborn brain size, weaning age, and birth interval, and for humans all metrics except birth interval.

Modern analyses based on enamel cuspal thickness, first molar eruption, and long-period line periodicity suggest that P. robustus had a significantly faster life history than modern humans, but also suggest that its life history was not analogous to living non-human apes. The δ^{44/42}Ca values in P. robustus enamel show that very shortly after birth, individuals of this species began to consume significant quantities of food other than breastmilk.

=== Pathology ===
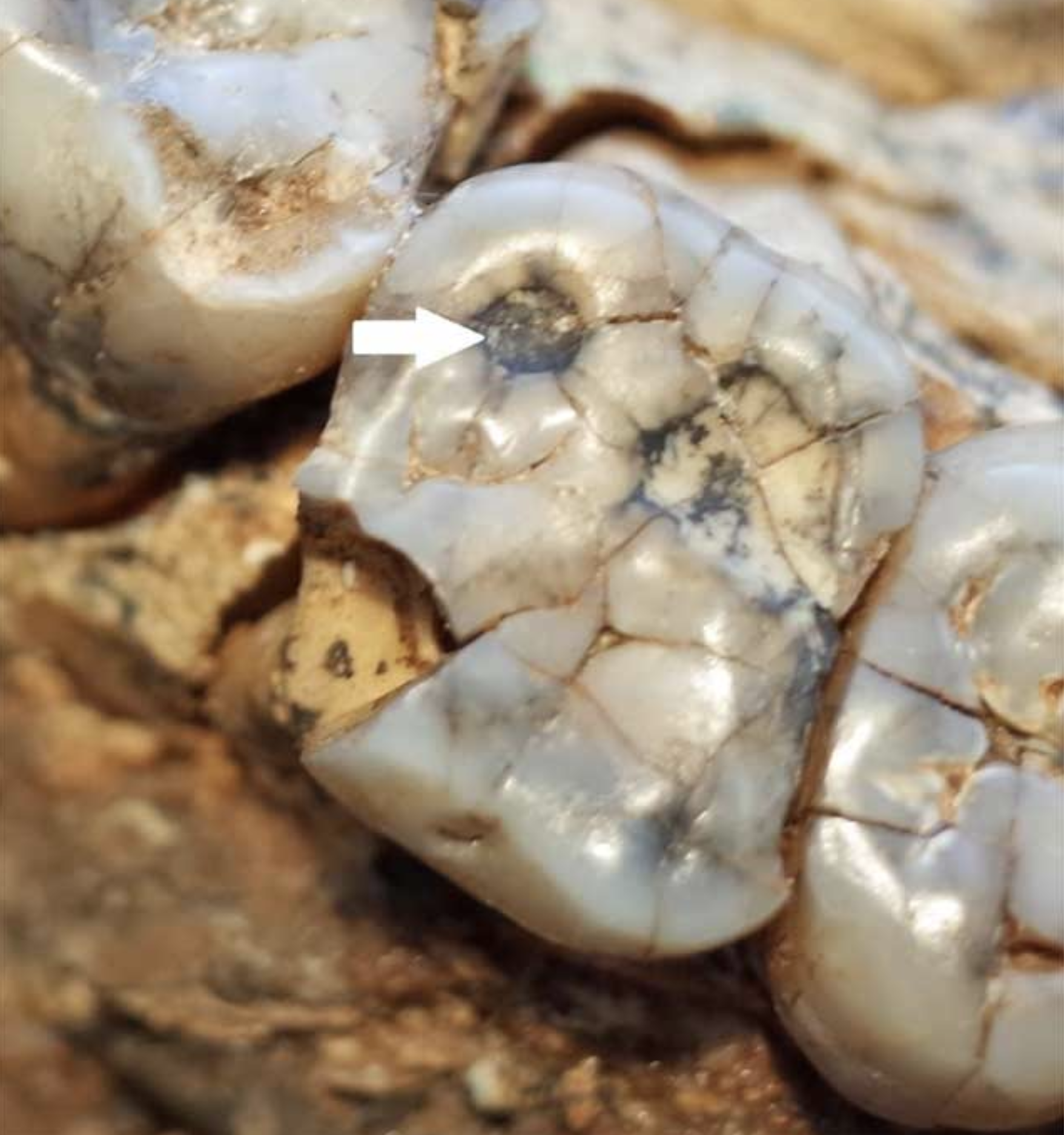
The left upper 1st molar of SK 57 with tertiary dentin (white arrow)

Based on a sample of 402 teeth, P. robustus seems to have had a low incidence rate of about 12–16% for tertiary dentin, which forms to repair tooth damage caused by excessive wearing or dental cavities. This is similar to what was found for A. africanus and H. naledi (all three inhabited the Cradle of Humankind at different points in time). In contrast, chimpanzees have an incidence rate of 47%, and gorillas as much as 90%, probably due to a diet with a much higher content of tough plants.

P. robustus seems to have had notably high rates of pitting enamel hypoplasia (PEH), where tooth enamel formation is spotty instead of mostly uniform. In P. robustus, about 47% of baby teeth and 14% of adult teeth were affected, in comparison to about 6.7% and 4.3%, respectively, for the combined teeth of A. africanus, A. sediba, early Homo, and H. naledi. The condition of these holes covering the entire tooth is consistent with the modern human ailment amelogenesis imperfecta. Since circular holes in enamel coverage are uniform in size, only present on the molar teeth, and have the same severity across individuals, the PEH may have been a genetic condition. It is possible that the coding region concerned with thickening enamel also increased the risk of developing PEH.

As many as four P. robustus individuals have been identified as having had dental cavities, indicating a rate similar to non-agricultural modern humans (1–5%). This is odd as P. robustus is thought to have had a diet high in gritty foods, and gritty foods should decrease cavity incidence rate, so P. robustus may have often consumed high-sugar cavity-causing foods. PEH may have also increased susceptibility to cavities. A molar from Drimolen showed a cavity on the tooth root, a rare occurrence in fossil great apes. In order for cavity-creating bacteria to reach this area, the individual would have also presented either alveolar resportion, which is commonly associated with gum disease; or super-eruption of the tooth which occurs when it becomes worn down and has to erupt a bit more in order to maintain a proper bite, exposing the root in the process. The latter is most likely, and the exposed root seems to have caused hypercementosis to anchor the tooth in place. The cavity seems to have been healing, possibly due to a change in diet or mouth microbiome, or the loss of the adjacent molar.

In a sample of 15 P. robustus specimens, all of them exhibited mild to moderate alveolar bone loss resulting from periodontal disease (the wearing away of the bone which supports the teeth due to gum disease). In contrast, in a sample of 10 A. africanus specimens, three exhibited no pathologies of the alveolar bone. Measuring the distance between the alveolar bone and the cementoenamel junction, P. robustus possibly suffered from a higher rate of tooth-attachment loss, unless P. robustus had a higher cervical height (the slightly narrowed area where the crown meets the root) in which case these two species had the same rate of tooth-attachment loss. If the former is correct, then the difference may be due to different dietary habits, chewing strategies, more pathogenic mouth microflora in P. robustus, or some immunological difference which made P. robustus somewhat more susceptible to gum disease.

While removing the matrix encapsulating TM 1517, Schepers noted a large rock, which would have weighed 75 g (2.6 oz), which had driven itself into the braincase through the parietal bone. He considered this evidence that another individual had killed TM 1517 by launching the rock as a projectile in either defense or attack, but the most parsimonious explanation is that the rock was deposited during the fossilisation process after TM 1517 had died. In 1961, science writer Robert Ardrey noted two small holes about 2.5 cm (an inch) apart on the child skullcap SK 54, and believed this individual had been killed by being struck twice on the head in an assault; in 1970, Brain reinterpreted this as evidence of a leopard attack.

== Palaeoecology ==
The Pleistocene Cradle of Humankind was mainly dominated by the springbok Antidorcas recki, but other antelope, giraffes, and elephants were also seemingly abundant megafauna. The carnivore assemblage comprises the sabertoothed cats Dinofelis spp. and Megantereon spp., and the hyena Lycyaenops silberbergi. Overall, the animal assemblage of the region broadly indicates a mixed, open-to-closed landscape featuring perhaps montane grasslands and shrublands. Australopithecines and early Homo likely preferred cooler conditions than later Homo, as there are no australopithecine sites that were below 1,000 m (3,300 ft) in elevation at the time of deposition. This would mean that, like chimps, they often inhabited areas with an average diurnal temperature of 25 °C (77 °F), dropping to 10 or 5 °C (50 or 41 °F) at night.

P. robustus also cohabited the Cradle of Humankind with H. ergaster/H. erectus. In addition, these two species resided alongside Australopithecus sediba which is known from about 2 million years ago at Malapa. The most recent A. africanus specimen, Sts 5, dates to about 2.07 million years ago, around the arrival of P. robustus and H. erectus. It has been debated whether or not P. robustus would have had symbiotic, neutral, or antagonist relations with contemporary Australopithecus and Homo. It is possible that South Africa was a refugium for Australopithecus until about 2 million years ago with the beginning of major climatic variability and volatility, and potentially competition with Homo and Paranthropus.

=== Fossil-bearing deposits ===
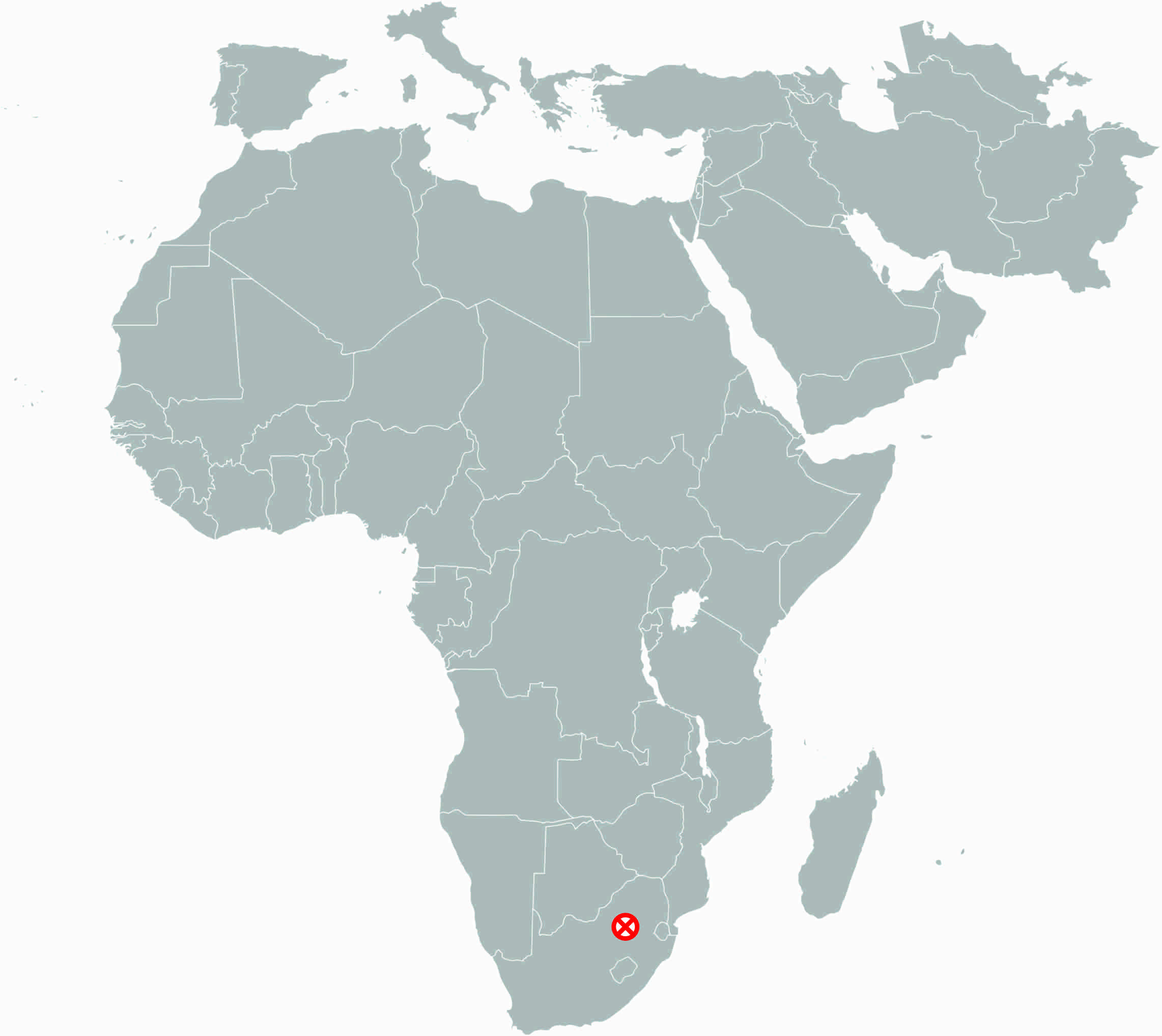
Location of the Cradle of Humankind

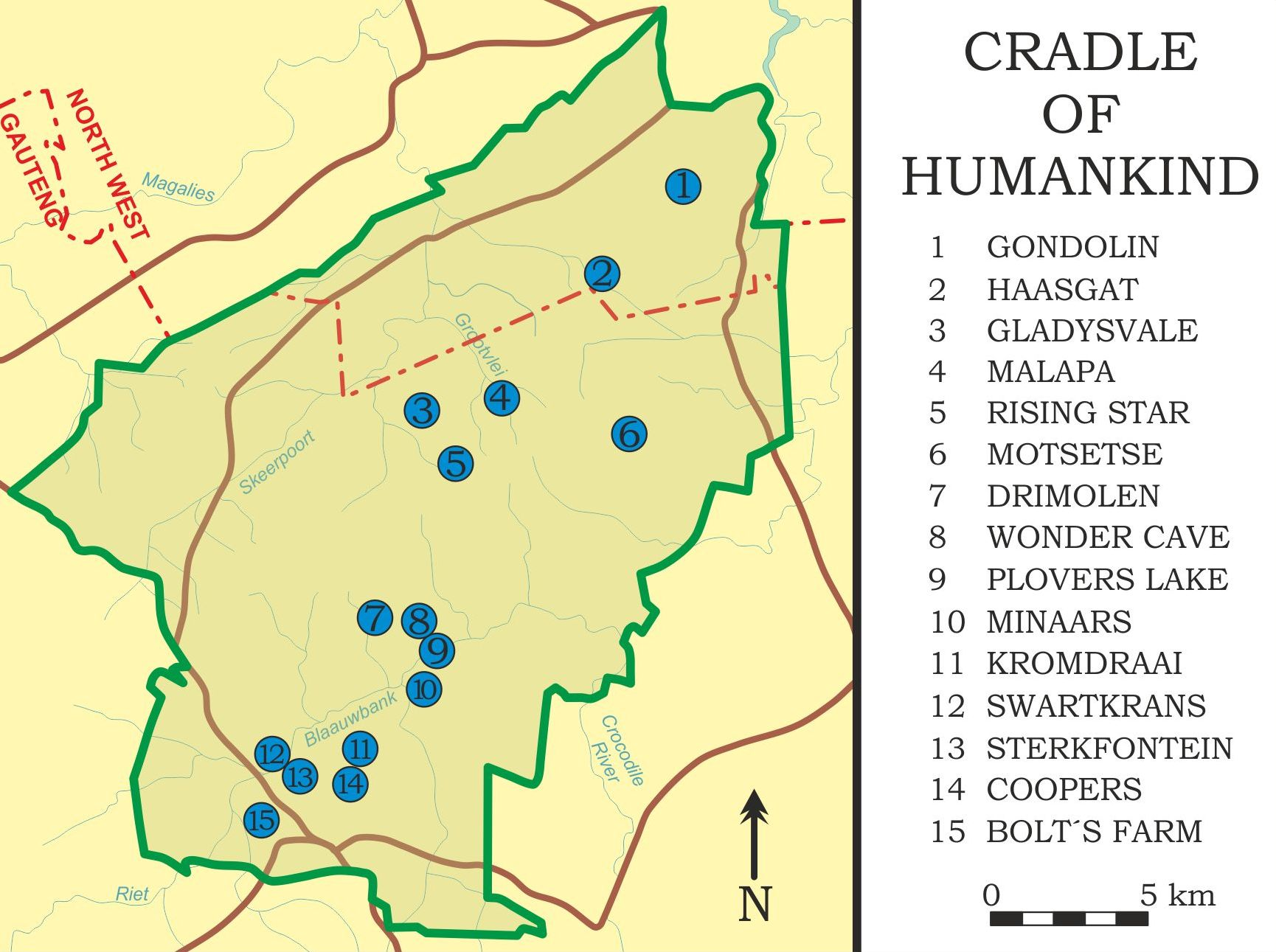
Fossil-bearing caves (P. robustus is known from 1, 7, and 11–14)

Swartkrans

At Swartkrans, P. robustus has been identified from Members 1–3. Homo is also found in these deposits, but species identification in Members 1 and 2 is debated between H. ergaster/H. erectus, H. habilis, H. rudolfensis, or multiple species. In total, over 300 P. robustus specimens representing over 130 individuals, predominantly isolated teeth, have been recovered from Swartkrans.

Member 1 and Member 3 have several mammal species in common, making dating by animal remains (biostratigraphy) yield overlapping time intervals. Like the East African Olduvai Bed I (2.03–1.75 million years ago) and Lower Bed II (1.75–1.70 million years ago), Member 1 preserved the antelope Parmularius angusticornis, the wildebeest, and the Cape buffalo. The presence of the Hamadryas baboon and Dinopithecus could mean Members 1–3 were deposited 1.9–1.65 million years ago, though the presence of warthogs suggests some sections of the deposits could date to after 1.5 million years ago. Uranium–lead dating reports intervals of 3.21–0.45 million years ago for Member 1 (a very large error range), 1.65–1.07 million years ago for Member 2, and 1.04–0.62 million years ago for Member 3, though more likely the younger side of the estimate; this could mean P. robustus outlived P. boisei.

Cosmogenic nuclide geochronology has reported much more constrained dates of 2.2–1.8 million years ago for Member 1, and 0.96 million years ago for Member 3. No suitable section of Member 2 could be identified to date.

Sterkfontein

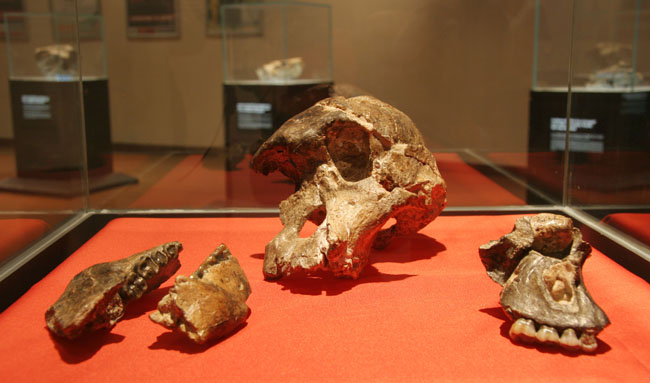
Ronald J. Clarke suggested StW 505 (above) is ancestral to P. robustus.

At Sterkfontein, only the specimens StW 566 and StW 569 are firmly assigned to P. robustus, coming from the "Oldowan infill" dating to 2–1.7 million years ago in a section of Member 5. Earlier members yielded A. africanus. In 1988, palaeoanthropologist Ronald J. Clarke suggested StW 505 from the earlier Member 4 was an ancestor to P. robustus. The specimen is still generally assigned to A. africanus, though the Sterkfontein hominins are known to have an exceedingly wide range of variation, and it is debated whether or not the materials represent multiple species instead of just A. africanus.

The appearance of the baboon Theropithecus oswaldi, zebras, lions, ostriches, springhares, and several grazing antelope in Member 5 indicates the predominance of open grasslands, but sediment analysis indicates the cave opening was moist during deposition, which could point to a well-watered wooded grassland.

Kromdraai

At Kromdraai, P. robustus has been unearthed at Kromdraai B, and almost all P. robustus fossils discovered in the cave have been recovered from Member 3 (out of 5 members). A total of 31 specimens representing at least 17 individuals have been recovered. The only potential Homo specimen from Member 3 is KB 5223, but its classification is debated. The ear bones of the juvenile KB 6067 from Member 3 is consistent with that of P. robustus, but the dimensions of the cochlea and oval window better align with the more ancient StW 53 from Sterkfontein Member 4 with undetermined species designation. KB 6067, therefore, may possibly be basal to (more ancient than) other P. robustus specimens, at least those for which ear morphology is known.

Palaeomagnetism suggests Member 3 may date to 1.78–1.6 million years ago, Member 2 to before 1.78 million years ago, and Member 1 to 2.11–1.95 million years ago.

The animal remains of Kromdraai A suggest deposition occurred anywhere between 1.89 and 1.63 million years ago, and the presence of Oldowan or Achulean tools indicates early Homo activity. The biostratigraphic dating of Kromdraai B is less clear as there are no animal species which are known to have existed in a narrow time interval, and many non-hominin specimens have not been assigned to a species (left at genus level). About 75% of mammalian remains other than P. robustus are monkeys, including leaf-eating colobine monkeys, possibly the earliest record of the Hamadryas baboon, Gorgopithecus, and Papio angusticeps in South Africa. The absence of the baboons T. oswaldi and Dinopithecus could potentially mean Member 3 is older than Sterkfontein Member 5 and Swartkrans Member 1; which, if correct, would invalidate the results from palaeomagnetism, and make these specimens among the oldest representatives of the species.

Gondolin Cave

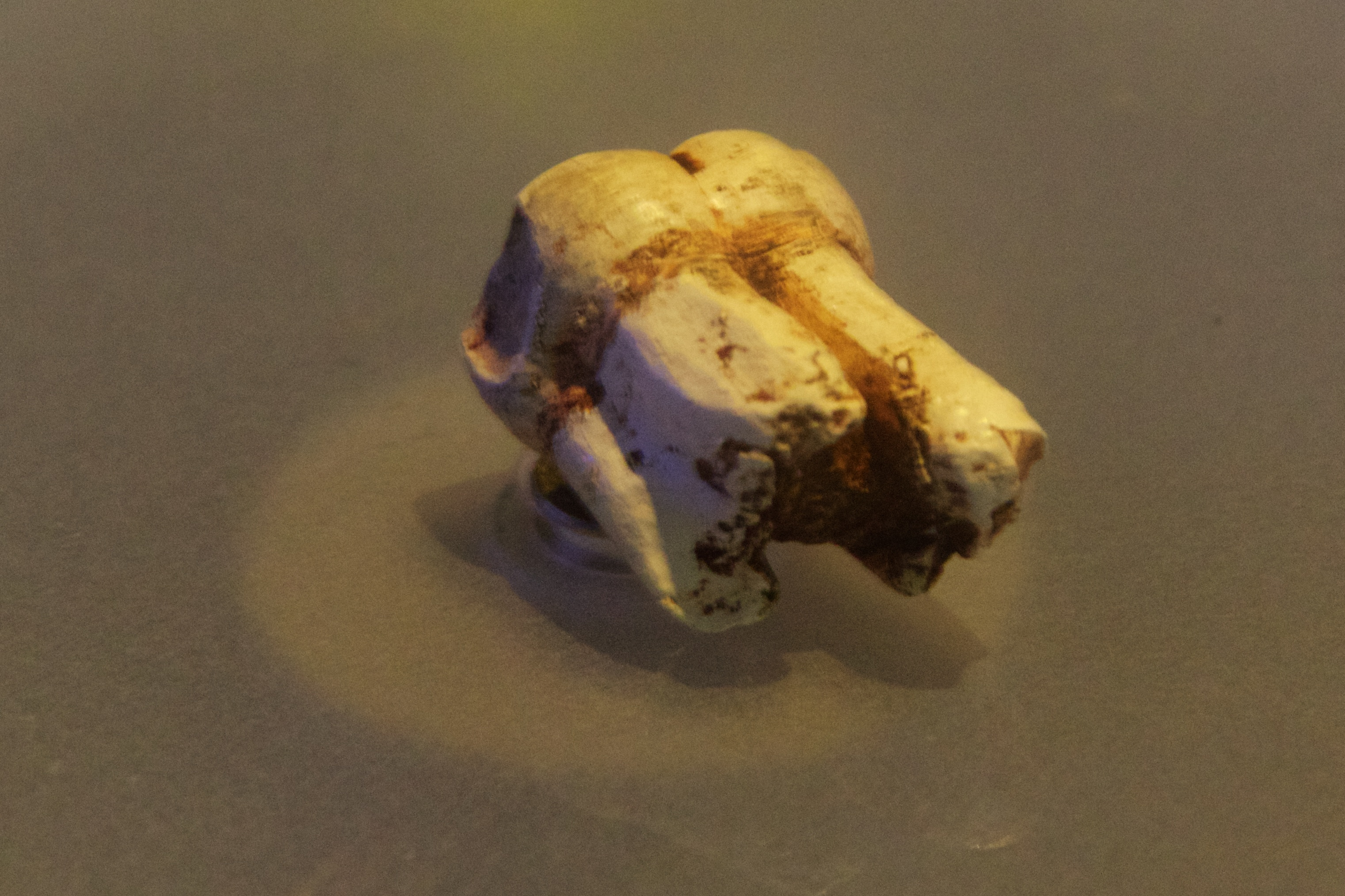
GDA-2 from Gondolin Cave

Gondolin Cave has yielded 3 hominin specimens: a right third premolar assigned to early Homo (G14018), a partial left gracile australopithecine first or second molar (GDA-1), and a robust australopithecine second molar (GDA-2). The first hominin specimen (G14018) was found by German palaeontologist Elisabeth Vrba in 1979, and the other two specimens were recovered in 1997 by, respectively, South African palaeoanthropologist Andre Keyser and excavator L. Dihasu. GDA-2—measuring 18.8 mm × 18.1 mm (0.74 in × 0.71 in), an area of 340 mm^{2} (0.53 sq in)—is exceptionally large for P. robustus, which has a recorded maximum of 290 mm^{2} (0.45 sq in). This falls within the range of P. boisei 278–378 mm^{2} (0.431–0.586 sq in), so the discoverers assigned it to an indeterminate species of Paranthropus rather than P. robustus.

GDA-2 was found alongside the pig Metridiochoerus andrewsi, which means the tooth must be 1.9–1.5 million years old. Using this and palaeomagnetism, it may date to roughly 1.8 million years ago.

Cooper's Cave

Cooper's Cave was first reported to yield P. robustus remains in 2000 by South African palaeoanthropologists Christine Steininger and Lee Rogers Berger. Specimens include a crushed partial right face (COB 101), three isolated teeth, a juvenile jawbone, and several skull fragments.

The animal remains in the hominin-bearing deposit are similar to those of Swartkrans and Kromdraai A, so the Cooper's Cave deposits may date to 1.87–1.56 million years ago.

Drimolen Cave

Drimolen Cave was first discovered to have yielded hominin remains by Keyser in 1992, who, in eight years, oversaw the recovery of 79 P. robustus specimens. Among these are the most complete P. robustus skulls: the presumed female DNH-7 (which also preserved articulated jawbone with almost all the teeth), and presumed male DNH 155. It was also associated with the H. ergaster/H. erectus skull DNH 134. The Drimolen material preserves several basal characteristics relative to the Swartkrans and Kromdraai remains (meaning it may be older).

The site is thought to be roughly 2–1.5 million years old based on animal remains which have also been recovered from Swartkrans Member 1. The animal assemblage is broadly similar to that of Cooper's Cave, meaning they probably are about the same age. In 2020, DNH 152 was palaeomagnetically dated to 2.04–1.95 million years ago, making it the oldest identified P. robustus specimen.

African Hominin timeline

=== Predation ===
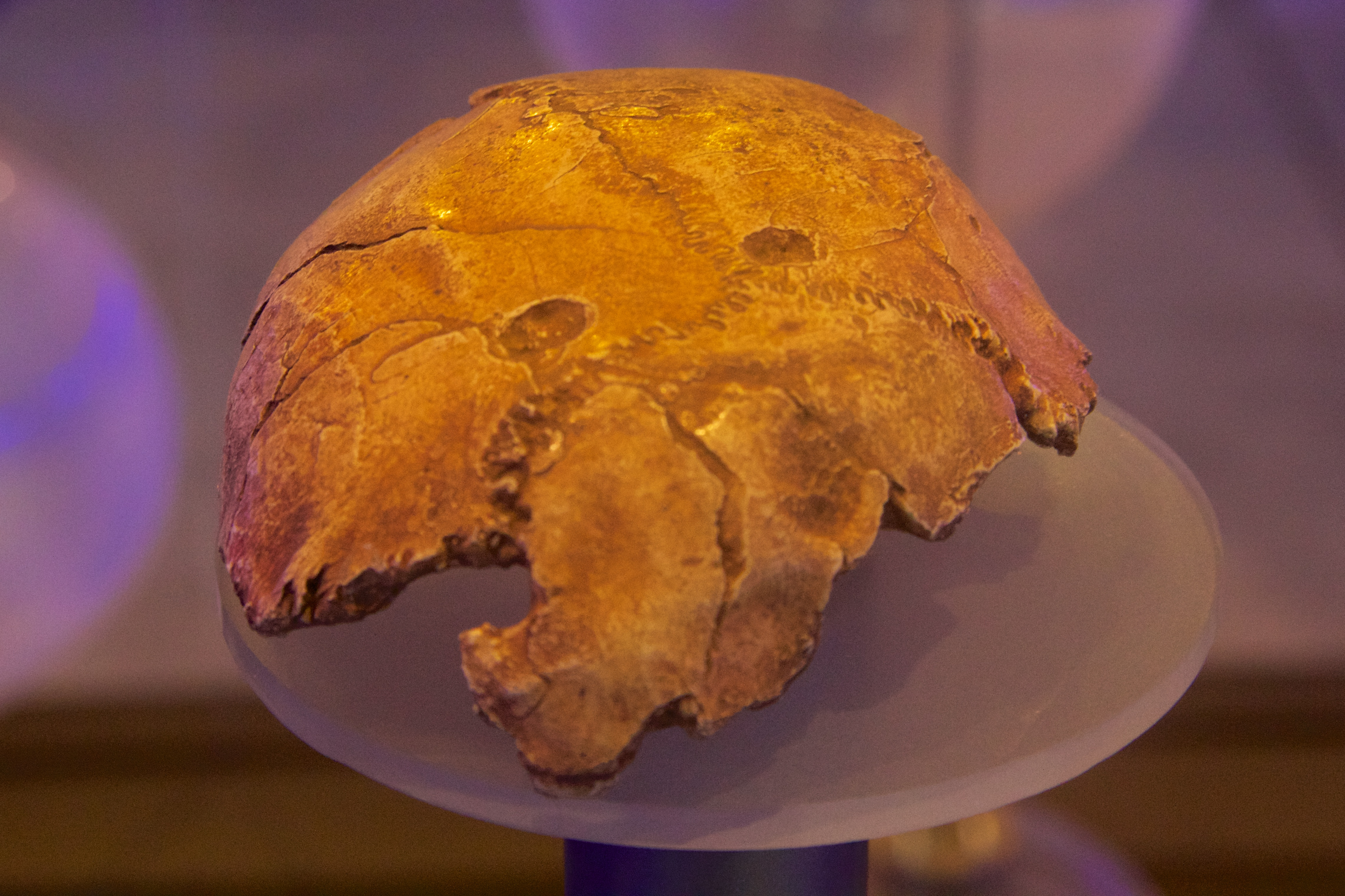
SK 54 skullcap with two holes probably inflicted by a leopard attack

Australopithecine bones may have accumulated in caves due to large carnivores dragging in carcasses, which was first explored in detail by Brain in his 1981 book The Hunters or the Hunted?: An Introduction to African Cave Taphonomy. The juvenile P. robustus skullcap SK 54 has two puncture marks consistent with the lower canines of the leopard specimen SK 349 from the same deposits. Brain hypothesised that Dinofelis and perhaps also hunting hyenas specialised on killing australopithecines, but carbon isotope analysis indicates these species predominantly ate large grazers, while the leopard, the sabertoothed Megantereon, and the spotted hyena were more likely to have regularly consumed P. robustus. Brain was unsure if these predators actively sought them out and brought them back to the cave den to eat, or inhabited deeper recesses of caves and ambushed them when they entered. Modern-day baboons in this region often shelter in sinkholes especially on cold winter nights, though Brain proposed that australopithecines seasonally migrated out of the Highveld and into the warmer Bushveld, only taking up cave shelters in spring and autumn.

As an antipredator behaviour, baboons often associate themselves with medium-to-large herbivores, most notably impalas, and it is possible that P. robustus as well as other early hominins which lived in open environments did so also, given they are typically associated with an abundance of medium-to-large bovid and horse remains.

=== Extinction ===
P. robustus has been dated to about 2.27 to 0.87 (or, more conservatively, 2 to 1) million years ago. Though P. robustus was a rather hardy species with a tolerance for environmental variability, it seems to have preferred wooded environments, and similarly most P. robustus remains date to a wet period in South Africa 2–1.75 million years ago conducive to such biomes. The extinction of P. robustus coincided with the Mid-Pleistocene Transition, and the doubling of glacial cycle duration. During glacial events, with more ice locked up at the poles, the tropical rain belt contracted towards the equator, subsequently causing the retreat of wetland and woodland environments. Before the transition, P. robustus populations possibly contracted to certain wooded refuge zones over 21,000-year cycles, becoming regionally extinct in certain areas until the wet cycle whereupon it would repopulate those zones. The continual prolonging of dry cycles may have caused its extinction, with the last occurrence in the fossil record 1–0.6 million years ago (though more likely 0.9 million years ago). Homo possibly was able to survive by inhabiting a much larger geographical range, more likely to find a suitable refuge area during unfavourable climate swings.

However, the geographical range of P. robustus in the fossil record is roughly 500 km^{2} (190 sq mi), whereas the critically endangered eastern gorilla (with the smallest range of any African ape) inhabits 70,000 km^{2} (27,000 sq mi), the critically endangered western gorilla 700,000 km^{2} (270,000 sq mi), and the endangered chimpanzee 2.6 million km^{2} (1 million mi^{2}). Therefore, fossil distribution very unlikely represents the true range of the species; consequently, P. robustus possibly went extinct much more recently somewhere other than the Cradle of Humankind (Signor–Lipps effect).

== See also ==
- African archaeology
- Australopithecus africanus – Extinct hominid from South Africa
- Australopithecus sediba – Extinct hominin from South Africa
- Homo ergaster – Extinct species or subspecies of archaic human
- Homo habilis – Archaic human species from 2.4 to 1.65 mya
- Homo naledi – South African archaic human species
- Homo rudolfensis – Extinct hominin from the Early Pleistocene of East Africa
- Paranthropus aethiopicus – Extinct species of hominin of East Africa
- Paranthropus boisei – Extinct species of hominin of East Africa
