= TM 1517 =

Hominin fossil

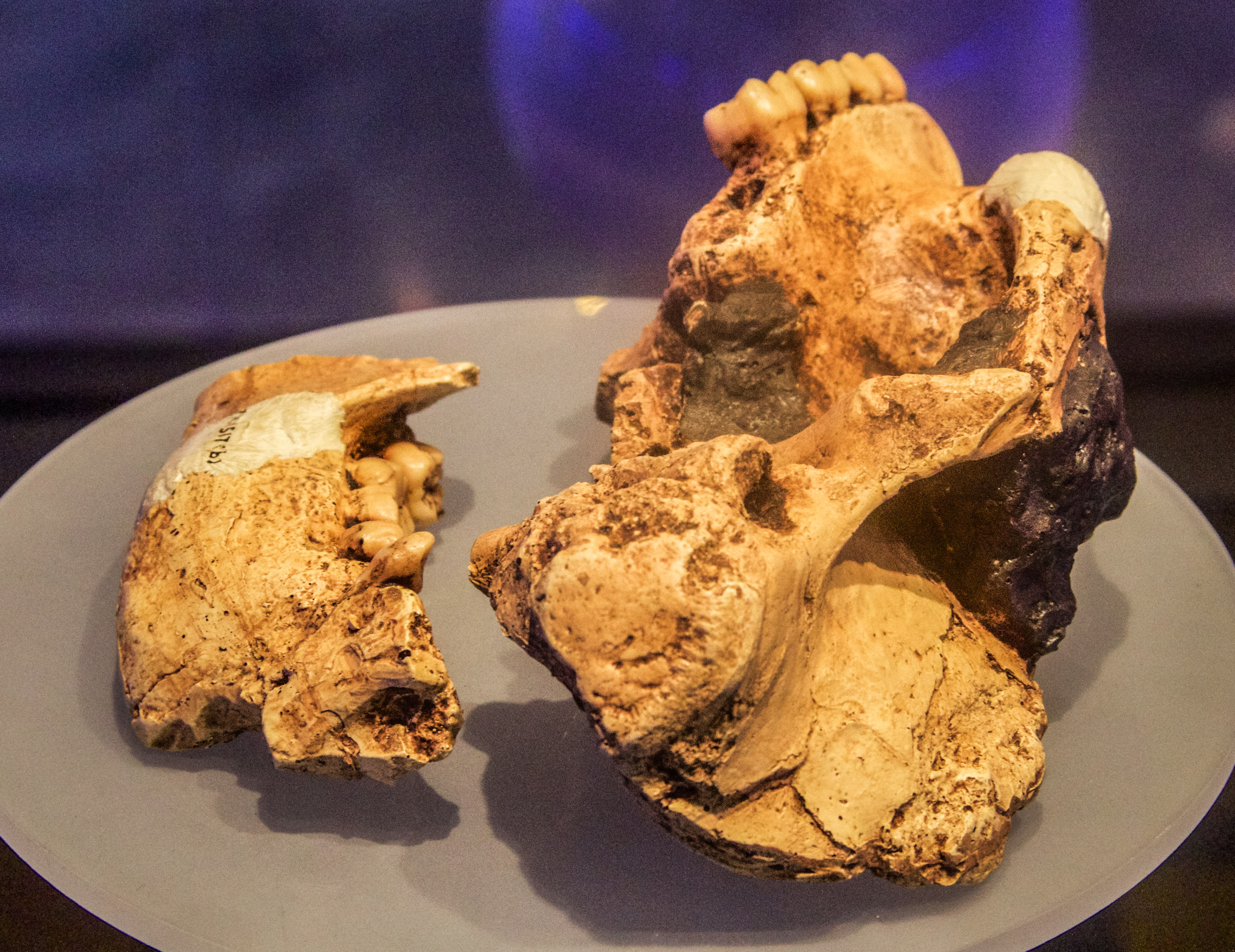
- Catalog no.: TM 1517
- Species: Paranthropus robustus
- Age: 2 million years
- Place discovered: Kromdraai, South Africa
- Date discovered: 1938
- Discovered by: Robert Broom

TM 1517 is a fossilized skull and lower mandible of the species Paranthropus robustus. It was discovered at Kromdraai, South Africa in 1938 by Robert Broom.

Its characteristics include bony ear tubes positioned below the plane of the cheek bones (more like humans than apes), and a forward set foramen magnum indicating a more erect posture than African apes. In comparison to the genus Australopithecus, TM 1517 is a bit larger, more robust with a flatter face and smaller canines.

== See also ==
- List of fossil sites (with link directory)
- List of hominina (hominid) fossils (with images)
