= SK 46 =

Hominin fossil

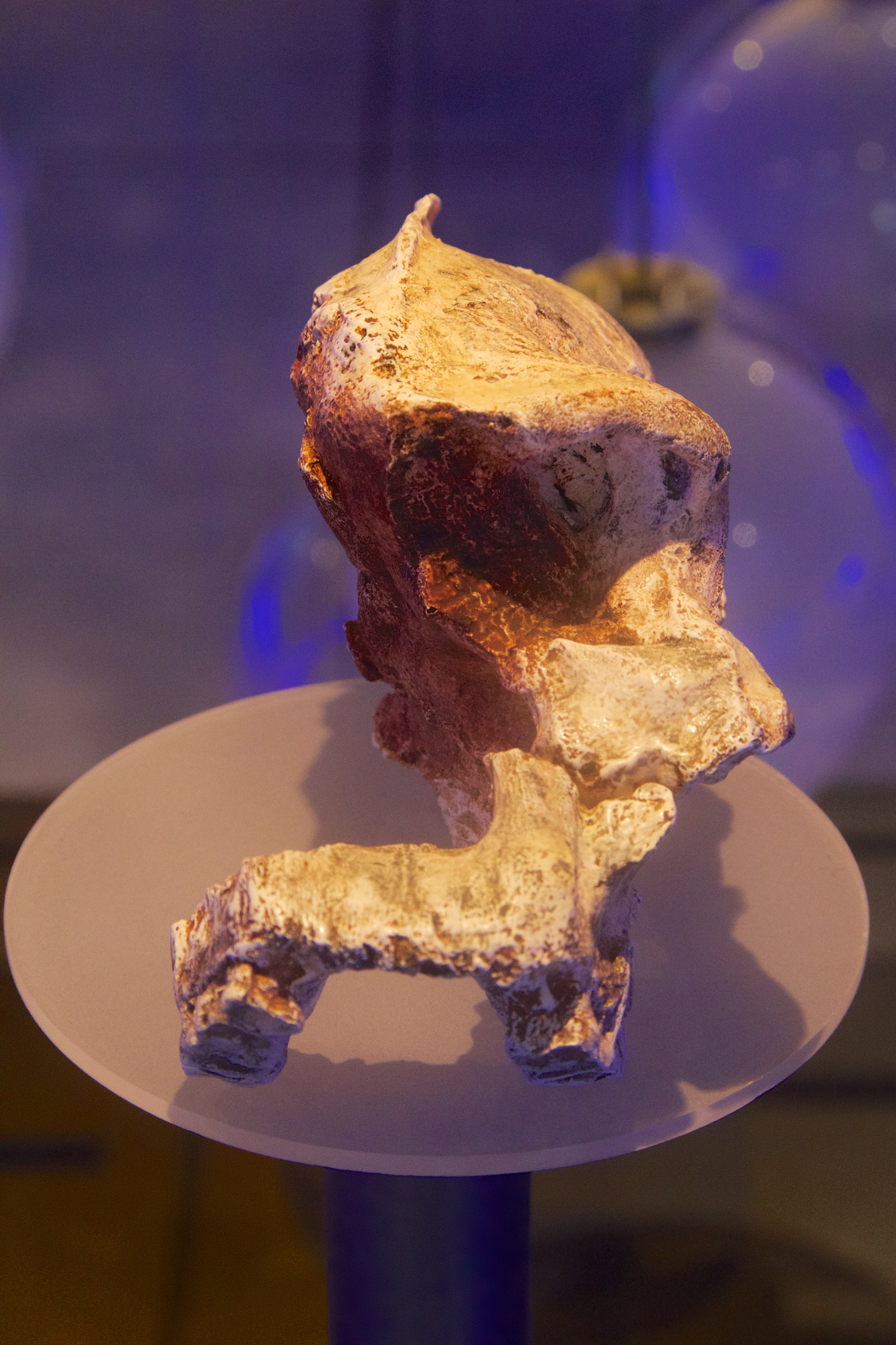
- Catalog no.: SK 46
- Species: Paranthropus robustus
- Age: 1.65 million years
- Place discovered: Gauteng, South Africa
- Date discovered: 1949
- Discovered by: Robert Broom

SK 46 is the fossilized partial cranium and palate of the species Paranthropus robustus. It was discovered in Swartkrans, South Africa by local quarrymen and Robert Broom in 1949.

It is estimated to be 1.5-1.8 million years old.

Its characteristics include large cheek teeth and a sagittal crest. The large teeth and crest for attaching chewing muscles indicate a diet consisting mainly of coarse vegetable matter.

== See also ==
- List of fossil sites (with link directory)
- List of hominina (hominid) fossils (with images)
