= SK 48 =

Fossilised skull of the species Paranthropus robustus

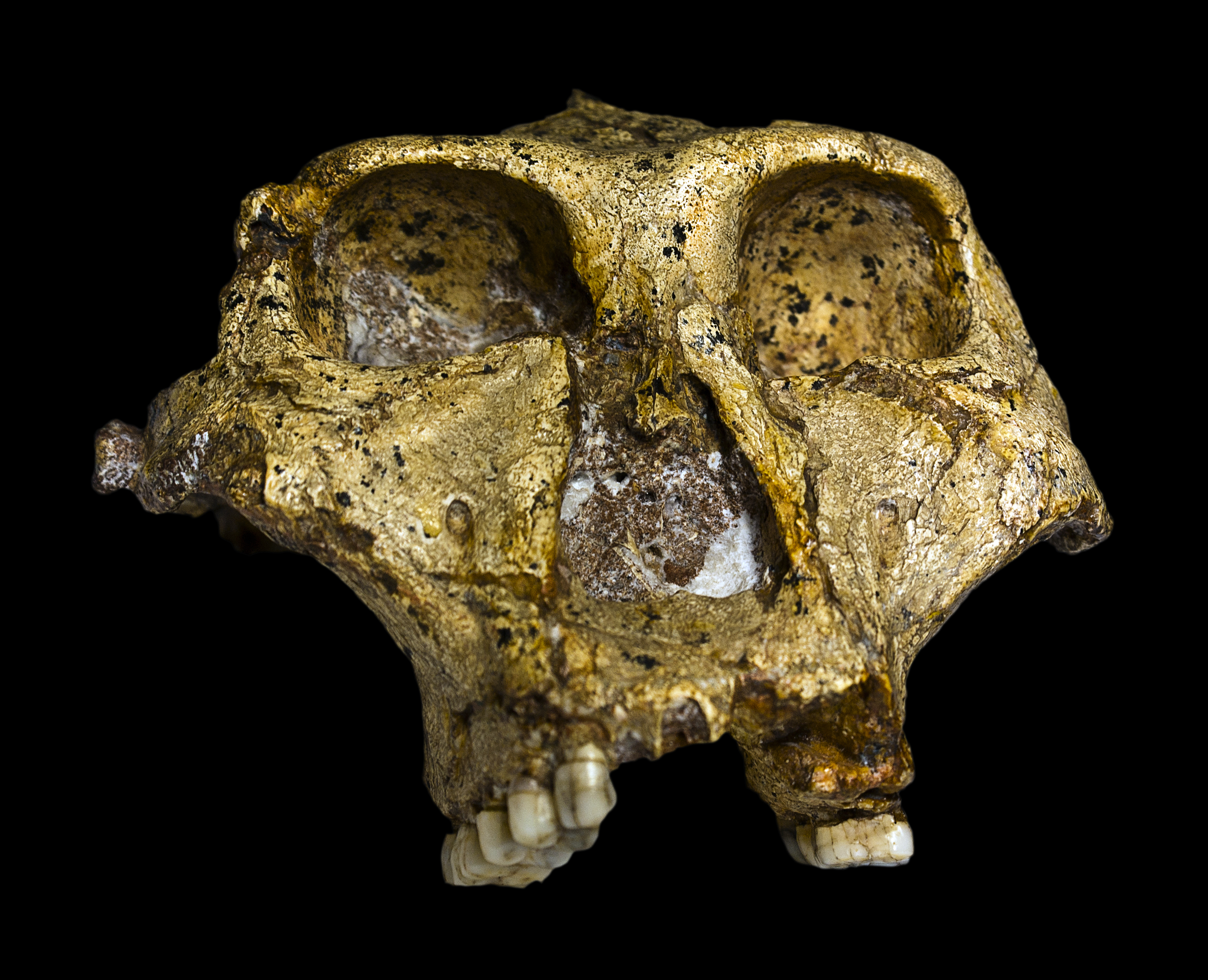
- Catalog no.: SK 48
- Species: Paranthropus robustus
- Age: 1.8 mya
- Place discovered: Swartkrans, South Africa
- Date discovered: 1948
- Discovered by: Robert Broom

SK 48 is a fossilized skull of the species Paranthropus robustus. It was found at Swartkrans, South Africa, in 1950 by a quarry-worker. Estimated to be about 1.8 million years old, it is characterized by a robust appearance, bulging and continuous brow, broad flat face and a deep jaw with large chewing teeth/muscle attachments. It retained a canine, premolar and three molars. SK 48 was an adult at the time of death, indicated by all three molars being present. In 1952, paleontologist Robert Broom inferred that it is a female due to the diminutive sagittal crest.

The mandible SK 23 was discovered at the same time and in the same location. Even though studies indicate that it came from a separate individual, the two fossils are considered so closely related that they can be studied together. The mandible is also very robust and contains a complete dentition.

== See also ==
- List of fossil sites (with link directory)
- List of hominina (hominid) fossils (with images)
