= Peter Elliott (British actor) =

English actor (born 1956)

Peter Elliott (born 1956 in Yorkshire, England) is a British actor best known for playing apes and other non-human characters in film and television.

== Early life ==
Elliott grew up in Hertfordshire; one parent was a woodwork teacher. He was trained as a Method actor at East 15 Acting School. His interests as an early-career performer were in highly physical forms of acting, doing acrobatics, martial arts, and boxing.

== Acting career ==
Elliott's specialization in ape roles began in 1978, when he auditioned for the film Greystoke: The Legend of Tarzan, Lord of the Apes (released 1984). Producers on the film, disappointed by a pre-production attempt to create ape movement using mime and animatronics, instead hired Elliott on the strength of a "very apelike" screen test. Tasked with determining whether costumed human actors should be mixed with real apes on the production, Elliott spent two years as a head of research and development for the film (eventually opting for an all-human cast), and was sent out to study simian movement at the Institute for Primate Studies at the University of Oklahoma. Elliott spent several months at the institute, observing chimpanzee behavior and conversing in American Sign Language with the chimpanzee Washoe. He brought his findings back to the forty some actors who played apes in the film, and appeared onscreen himself as Silverbeard, Tarzan's adoptive chimpanzee father. When Dino de Laurentiis decided to produce the sequel King Kong Lives in 1986, Elliott came back to the screen under the giant ape's suit created and worn by Rick Baker for the first movie instead of him.

Elliott went on to be cast in numerous prominent Hollywood ape roles in the 1980s and 1990s, including Simba in Gorillas in the Mist (1988) and the title roles in Missing Link (1988) and Buddy (1997). Film workers and journalists have frequently nicknamed Elliott the industry's "primary primate".

== Movement directing work ==
Elliott's later career has mixed acting work with jobs as a movement director, movement-based drama teacher, and animal-role choreographer. Jobs coaching and choreographing other actors' movement for non-human characters include work on the films Quest for Fire (1981), Congo (1995), The Hitchhiker's Guide to the Galaxy (2005), Where the Wild Things Are (2009), Snow White and the Huntsman (2012), and Jack the Giant Slayer (2013), and on Birmingham Stage Company's theatrical adaptations of Rudyard Kipling's The Jungle Book (2004) and Michael Morpurgo's Kensuke's Kingdom (2005).
