= Gondolin Cave =

South African cave system

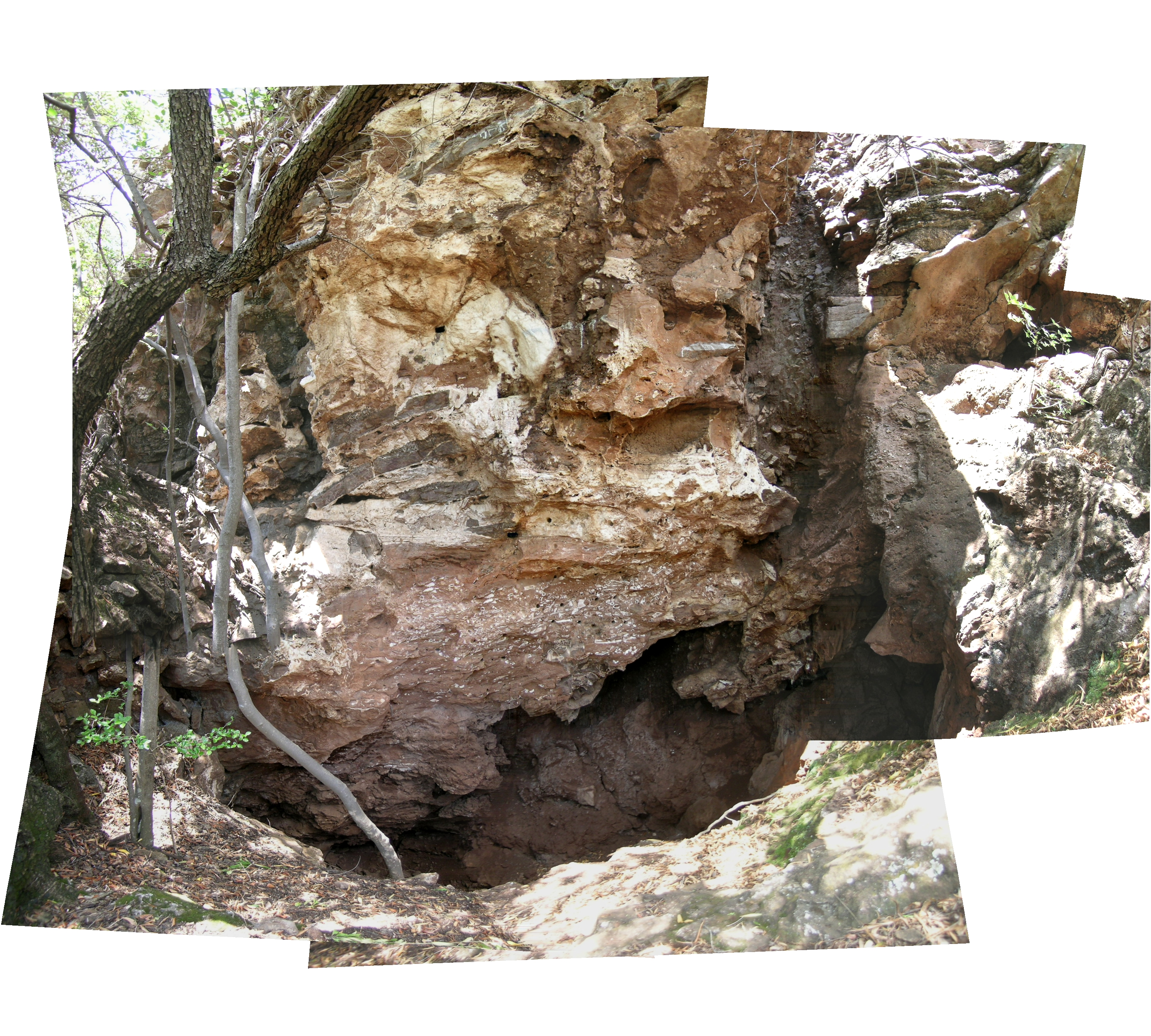
- Composite view

- location in South Africa
- 25°49′37″S 27°50′49″E
- Location: Northwest Province
- Region: South Africa

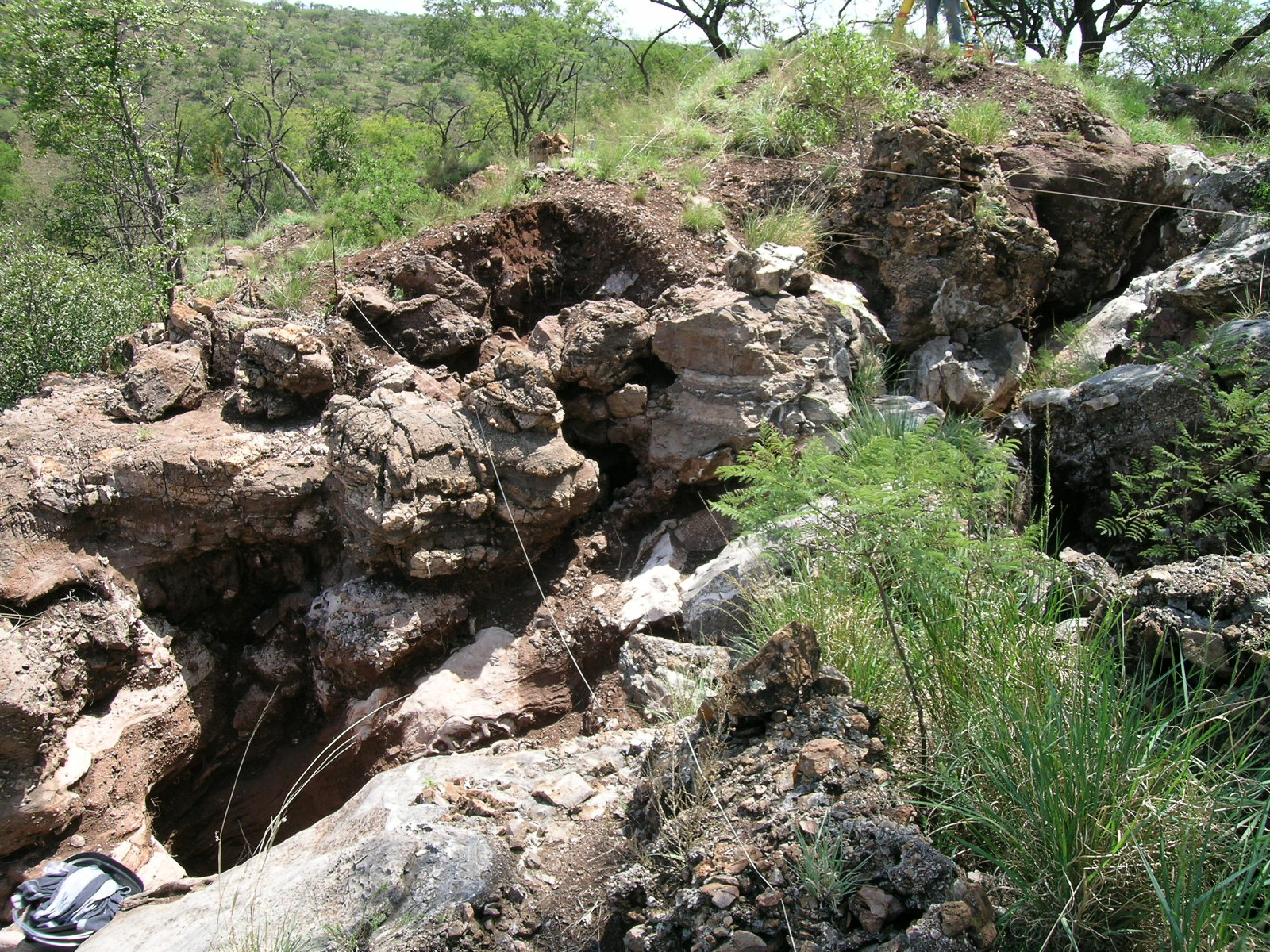
GD 1 deposit region excavated in 2003/2004

Gondolin Cave is a fossiliferous dolomitic paleocave system in the Northwest Province, South Africa. The paleocave formed in the Eccles Formation dolomites (Malmani Subgroup, Chuniespoort Group carbonate-banded iron formation marine platform). Gondolin is currently the only described hominin-bearing fossil site in the Northwest Province-portion of the designated Cradle of Humankind UNESCO World Heritage Site. The cave is located on privately owned land and is not accessible to the public. As is the case with other South African Paleo-cave systems with Pliocene and/or Pleistocene fossil deposits, the system was mined for lime during the early 20th century. As a result, the system has been heavily disturbed and consists of only a small active cave, a series of in situ remnant cave deposits, and extensive dumpsites of ex situ calcified sediments produced during mining activities.

== Site history and excavations ==
No records of the date of lime mining activities at Gondolin, maps or photographs of the cave prior to mining are known to exist. Long-term residents near Gondolin report that the system was mined prior to the 1950s. The cave was named after J.R.R. Tolkien's Gondolin by the early 1970s. (Note: The story of the Fall of Gondolin was published only in 1977, in The Silmarillion, but the name Gondolin had been published already in The Lord of the Rings as part of Song of Durin's Awakening in The Fellowship of the Ring in the context of the underground city of Moria.) Exposed fossils in the cave system were noted at least as early as the 1970s and brought to the attention of Elisabeth Vrba and David Panagos at the (then) Transvaal Museum (now the Ditsong National Museum of Natural History), who initiated excavations in early 1979. The first phase of excavation addressed the extremely fossiliferous in situ remnant deposits adhering to the northern wall of the cave system (the GD 2 deposits sensu). The three-week 1979 excavation removed approximately 2 m^{3} (71 cu ft) of calcified sediments from the northern cave wall. While two distinct sediment phases were recognized during the original excavation, later work with the fossil fauna and geology of the GD 2 deposits did not find any basis for multiple depositional phases within the sampled sequence. The removed sediment blocks were organised into 43 blocks/trays and processed using acetic acid at the Transvaal Museum. A significant gap in research at Gondolin occurred in the 1980s, during which time all of the excavated blocks were processed (but no further in situ or ex situ sampling is known to have occurred). The first description of the result fossil assemblage in 1993 only partially described 4,344 individual specimens that could be assigned to a specific taxonomic levels (out of the 90,663 total specimens recovered from acetic acid processing of the 43 trays/blocks).

In 1997 a survey of the sediments at Gondolin included the first sampling of the extensive ex situ dumpsite deposits at the locality via a test trench (Trench A). Materials removed from Trench A included fossiliferous breccia blocks from most, if not all, of the stratigraphic units present at the site (as well as loose fossil specimens sifted from decalcified sediments). From this sampled material (the GD A faunal assemblage), two isolated hominin teeth (representing two different individuals) were recovered. The first, GA 1, is a worn and fractured left molar that has not been confidently attributed to either genus or species (but resembles Homo in some features. In contrast, GA 2 is a complete left m2 that has been recently analysed and attributed to Paranthropus robustus (if from a large individual). (Note: Although Menter et al. 1999 and Grine et al. 2012 describe the two hominin teeth as 'GDA-1' and 'GDA-2', neither specimen (or any of the other Trench A fossils) were formally numbered or accessioned prior to cataloging by Adams 2006. Following museum guidelines, the Trench A fossils were given the prefix 'GA' and not 'GDA-'; hence the specimens are more accurately referred to as 'GA 1' and 'GA 2'.)

The most recent excavations at Gondolin were undertaken in 2003 and 2004 to explore the largely decalcified GD 1 deposits along the northwestern rim of the Gondolin locality. A four-week excavation season produced a sample of 4,863 fossil specimens from approximately 50 m^{3} (1,800 cu ft) of soil overburden and naturally decalcified sediments that were screened with 1mm mesh. Critically, integration of taphonomic and geologic data from the GD 1 excavations indicated that fundamentally different processes of fossil record formation were occurring at Gondolin during the formation of the GD 1 and GD 2 fossil assemblages. This result highlighted the complex, heterogenous geologic processes that can influence fossil deposition and assemblage composition in South African cave systems during the late Pliocene and early Pleistocene.

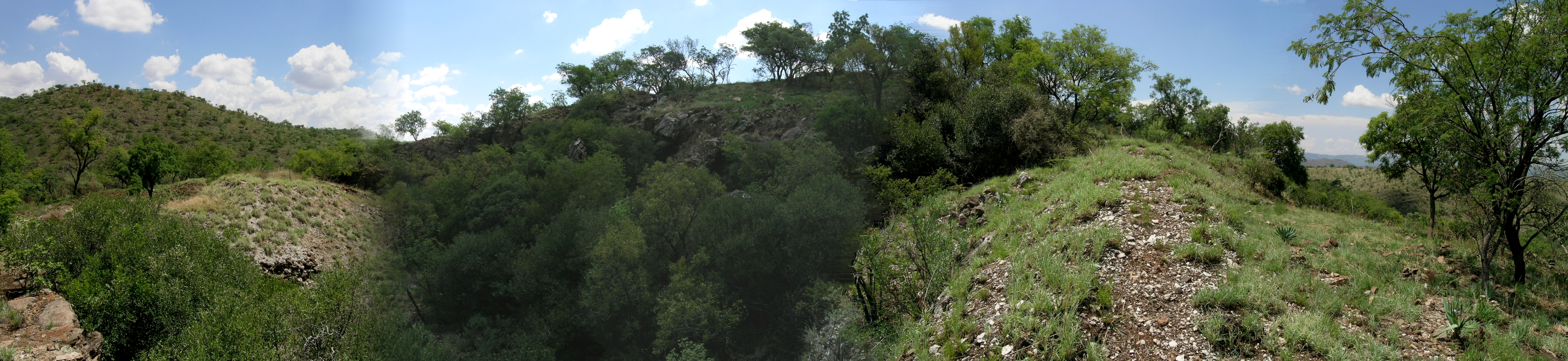
A 180 degree panorama of the Gondolin Cave system

== Fossil fauna ==
The original description of fossil specimens from the GD 2 deposits only addressed a small portion of the assemblage. A single hominin tooth that was originally thought to have been derived from the GD 2 sampling was later determined to be an intrusive modern Homo tooth. A comprehensive reanalysis of the Gondolin GD 2 assemblage undertaken from 2002 to 2004 led to the identification of 95,549 total individual specimens (in contrast to the 90,663 specimens originally noted in 1993), of which 16,477 are identifiable craniodental (3,484) or postcranial (12,993) specimens; with the remaining 79,076 specimens being unidentifiable (primarily long bone diaphysis) fragments.

The assemblage composition described from this reanalysis differs in key respects from that of the initial 1993 description, including significant shifts in the specimen counts attributed to individual taxonomic categories (both numbers of individual specimens and minimum numbers of individuals) and the removal of several species (Hippopotamus sp., Antidorcas australis/marsupialis, Procavia transvaalensis). The revised description of the GD 2 assemblage also reinforced several unique features of the collection compared to other South African late Pliocene and Pleistocene:

- The numerical dominance of two rarely encountered antelope species - klipspringer (Oreotragus oreotragus) and a species of reduncin (Redunca sp.) similar to the extant mountain reedbuck (Redunca fulvorufula).
- The first described occurrence of the extinct porcupine (Hystrix makapanensis) from an assemblage other than the Makapansgat Member 3 deposits (including the first postcrania attributed to the species).
- The first comprehensive taphonomic analysis of a South African early Pleistocene assemblage solely derived from in situ deposits.
- A robust sample of directly associated cranial and postcranial remains for many fossil species, including several groupings of articulated fossils.
- The recovery of fragile elements including hyoids and fetal/neonatal remains.
- The absence of any identificable primate remains within the assemblage.

== Age of the deposits ==
The Gondolin Palaeo-cave deposits have been dated using a combination of biostratigraphy and palaeomagnetism which indicate an age of around 1.8 million years.
