= STS 14 =

Hominin fossil

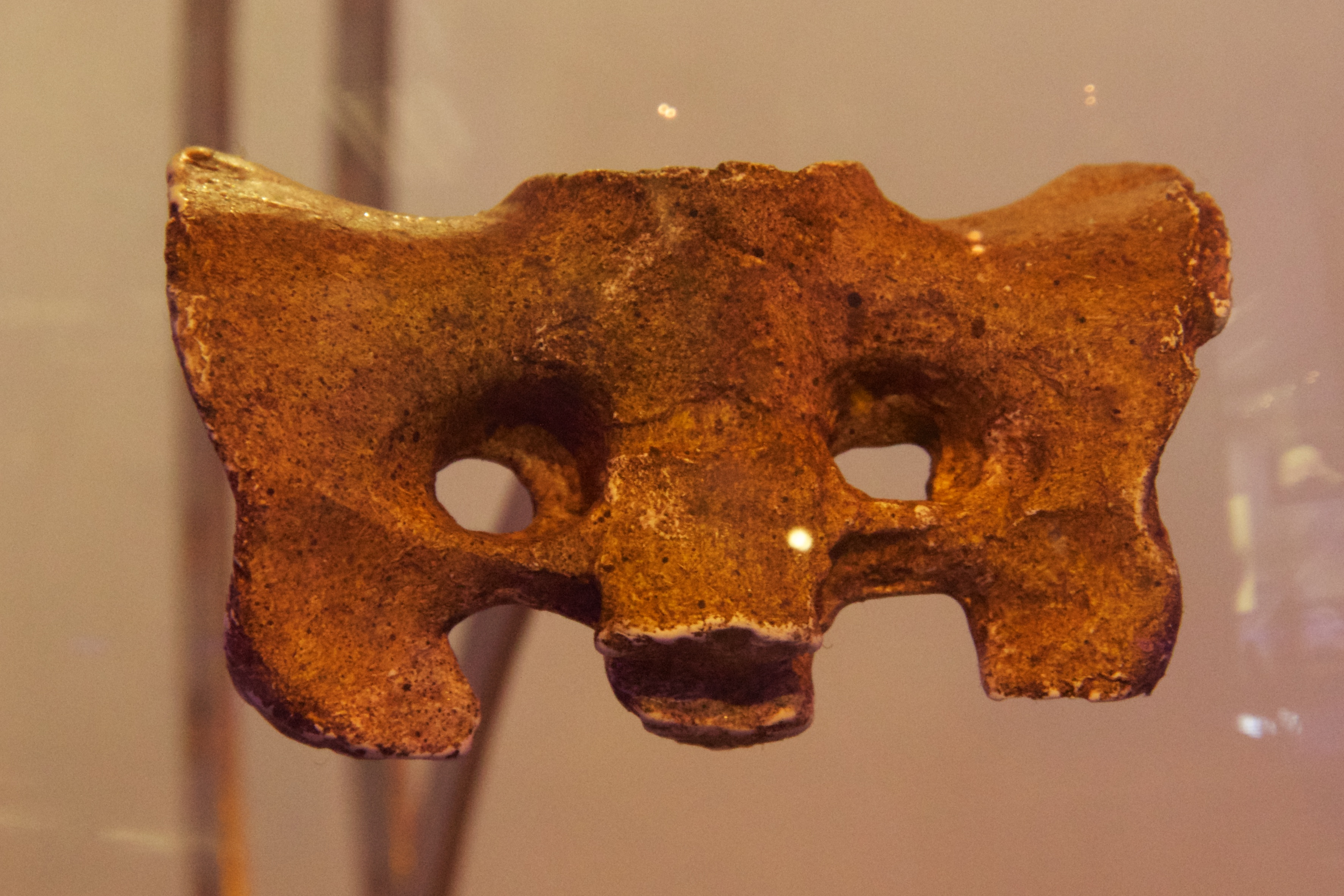
- Catalog no.: STS 14
- Species: Australopithecus africanus
- Age: 2.5 million years old
- Discovered by: Robert Broom and John T. Robinson

STS 14 is a fossilized partial skeleton of the species Australopithecus africanus. It was discovered at Sterkfontein, South Africa by Robert Broom and John T. Robinson in August 1947, and is estimated to be about 2.5 million years old.

Some scientists have proposed that STS 14 may have come from the same individual as STS 5 though that fossil is considered only 2.15 million years old.

== Description ==
The specimen consists of a pelvis, vertebral column and fragmentary rib and femur. Notable characteristics include the distinctly human-like shape of its pelvic blades, indicating a type of bipedalism. This find was the first to demonstrate, without a doubt, pre-Homo bipedality.

Curiously, the specimen has six lumbar vertebrae, more than either most humans, who have five, or modern apes, which may have five or fewer.

The specimen's sacrum contains an unfused intervertebral disk between the first and second sacral vertebrae, suggesting that the individual died before reaching maturity.

== See also ==
- List of human fossils
- List of fossil sites (with link directory)
- List of hominina (hominid) fossils (with images)
- StW 505
