= StW 505 =

Hominin fossil

Mr. Ples
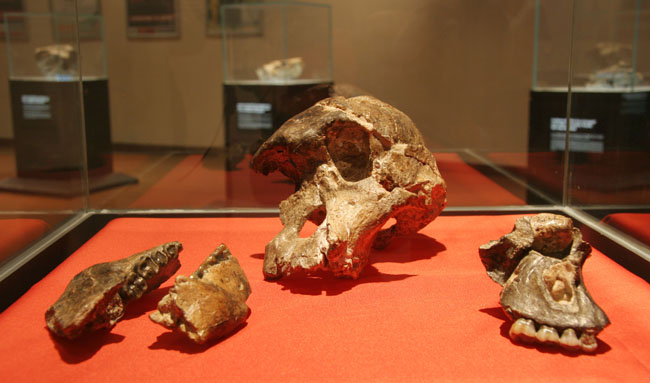
- Catalog no.: StW 505
- Common name: Mr. Ples
- Species: Australopithecus africanus
- Age: c. 2.333 million years
- Place discovered: Gauteng, South Africa
- Date discovered: 1989

StW 505 is the most complete hominin cranium discovered in Sterkfontein Member 4 since Broom's excavations. It was found in situ in Member 4 breccia in 1989 and is larger, on the whole, than any other cranium from Sterkfontein that has comparable parts.

Displacement due to breakage, as well as plastic deformation, has affected Stw 505 in several areas, especially the face and the vault. Diagnosticmorphology is nevertheless abundant in the specimen. In several areas the distinct anterior pillar, the straight inferior border of the zygoma, the pattern of cresting on the naso-alveolar clivus, the basal aspect of the temporal bone-Stw 505 closely matches the morphology of specimens of Australopithecus africanus and is distinct from other hominins. Some isolated characters overlap with other groups, mainly early Homo and/or A. robustus. However, only the hypodigm of A. africanus can encompass the full range of morphology. In some instances, Stw 505 adds more variation to the Sterkfontein sample. For example, prominent superciliary eminences are located in the medial portions of the supraorbital region and extend medially into a strongly protruding glabellar mound. These characteristics are probably attributable to sexual dimorphism. In many respects, Stw 505 highlights similarities between A. africanus and early Homo. Comparison with other species suggests that males of A. africanus do not show derived features of A. robustus that are not also present in females, and that cranial differences between A. afarensis and A. africanus have, if anything, been understated.

== See also ==
- List of human evolution fossils
- STS 14

== Bibliography ==
- Lockwood, CA; Tobias, PV (Jun 1999). "A large male hominin cranium from Sterkfontein, South Africa, and the status of Australopithecus africanus". J Hum Evol. 36 (6): 637–85. doi:10.1006/jhev.1999.0299. PMID 10330332.
- Reed, K; Fleagle, JG; Leakey, RE (2013). The Paleobiology of Australopithecus (Google Books). Vertebrate Paleobiology and Paleoanthropology. Springer. ISBN 9789400759190.
