= Ictidodraco =

Ictidodraco Temporal range: Late Permian

Scientific classification
- Domain: Eukaryota
- Kingdom: Animalia
- Phylum: Chordata
- Clade: Synapsida
- Clade: Therapsida
- Clade: †Therocephalia
- Superfamily: †Baurioidea
- Genus: †Ictidodraco; Broom and Robinson, 1948

Type species
- †Ictidodraco longiceps Broom and Robinson, 1948

Extinct genus of therapsids from the Late Permian of South Africa

Ictidodraco is an extinct genus of therocephalian therapsids from the Late Permian of South Africa. The type species Ictidodraco longiceps was named by South African paleontologists Robert Broom and John T. Robinson in 1948 from the Cistecephalus Assemblage Zone. Ictidodraco was once classified as a scaloposaurian in the family Silpholestidae. Scaloposauria and Silpholestidae are no longer regarded as valid groups, and Ictidodraco is now classified as a basal member of the clade Baurioidea.

== Description ==
Ictidodraco is a small therocephalian with a long, pointed snout. It has large orbits or eye sockets that are enclosed by complete postorbital bars at the back margin of the sockets. The temporal openings behind the orbits are relatively small. At the top of the skull, between the two temporal openings, the parietal region is wide. Unlike those of other therocephalians, the parietal does not form a distinctive sagittal crest.

As in other advanced therocephalians Ictidodraco has a small secondary palate. A secondary palate is a derived feature that gives advanced therocephalians a very mammal-like appearance, although it developed independently in the group as a result of convergence.
