= Silpholestes =

Silpholestes Temporal range: Late Permian

Scientific classification
- Domain: Eukaryota
- Kingdom: Animalia
- Phylum: Chordata
- Clade: Synapsida
- Clade: Therapsida
- Clade: †Therocephalia
- Family: †Silpholestidae; Watson and Romer, 1956
- Genus: †Silpholestes; Broom, 1948

Type species
- †Silpholestes jackae Broom, 1948

Extinct genus of therapsids from the Late Permian of South Africa

Silpholestes is an extinct genus of therocephalian therapsids from the Late Permian of South Africa. The type species Silpholestes jackae was named by South African paleontologist Robert Broom in 1948 from the Cistecephalus Assemblage Zone.

== Classification ==
Silpholestes lends its name to Silpholestidae, a family that traditionally encompassed many small therocephalians. Silpholestidae was first named by paleontologists D. M. S. Watson and Alfred Romer in 1956. In addition to Silpholestes, the genera Ictidodraco, Scaloporhinus, Silphictidoides, and Tetracynodon were all classified in Silpholestidae. Therocephalians that were once classified in this family are all very small, and have elongated and pointed snouts. Silpholestids were characterized by their short temporal openings at the back of the skull; in most therocephalians, these openings are very large and occupy much of the skull. Silpholestids were also distinguished by their wide parietal region between the temporal openings, which did not form a sagittal crest as in other therocephalians. Silpholestids were also characterized by their prominent angular bones at the back of the jaw, which are very deep and covered in radiating ridges. Another traditional group of small therocephalians, the scaloposaurids, have a small angular bone that does not stand out from the curvature of the jaw. Therocephalians that were grouped in Silpholestidae all have thin zygomatic arches and complete postorbital bars that enclose the back margin of the eye sockets. Most have six incisors, a pair of larger canines, and about ten postcanine teeth.

Silpholestids and scaloposaurids comprised the larger group Scaloposauria, which included nearly all small-bodied therocephalians. Most scaloposaurians are now thought to represent juvenile forms of larger therocephalians, and both Silpholestidae and Scaloposauridae are no longer regarded as valid groupings. Most scaloposaurians, including Silpholestes, are now regarded as basal members of the clade Baurioidea. Since there has never been a comprehensive phylogenetic analysis including all scaloposaurian taxa, it is unclear whether the therocephalians once classified as silpholestidae form their own clade.
