= Henry McHenry =

Henry McHenry may refer to:

- Henry McHenry (anthropologist) (born 1944), professor of anthropology
- Henry D. McHenry (1826–1890), U.S. representative from Kentucky
- Henry McHenry (baseball) (1910–1981), American pitcher and outfielder in Negro league baseball
