= Mrs. Ples =

Hominin fossil

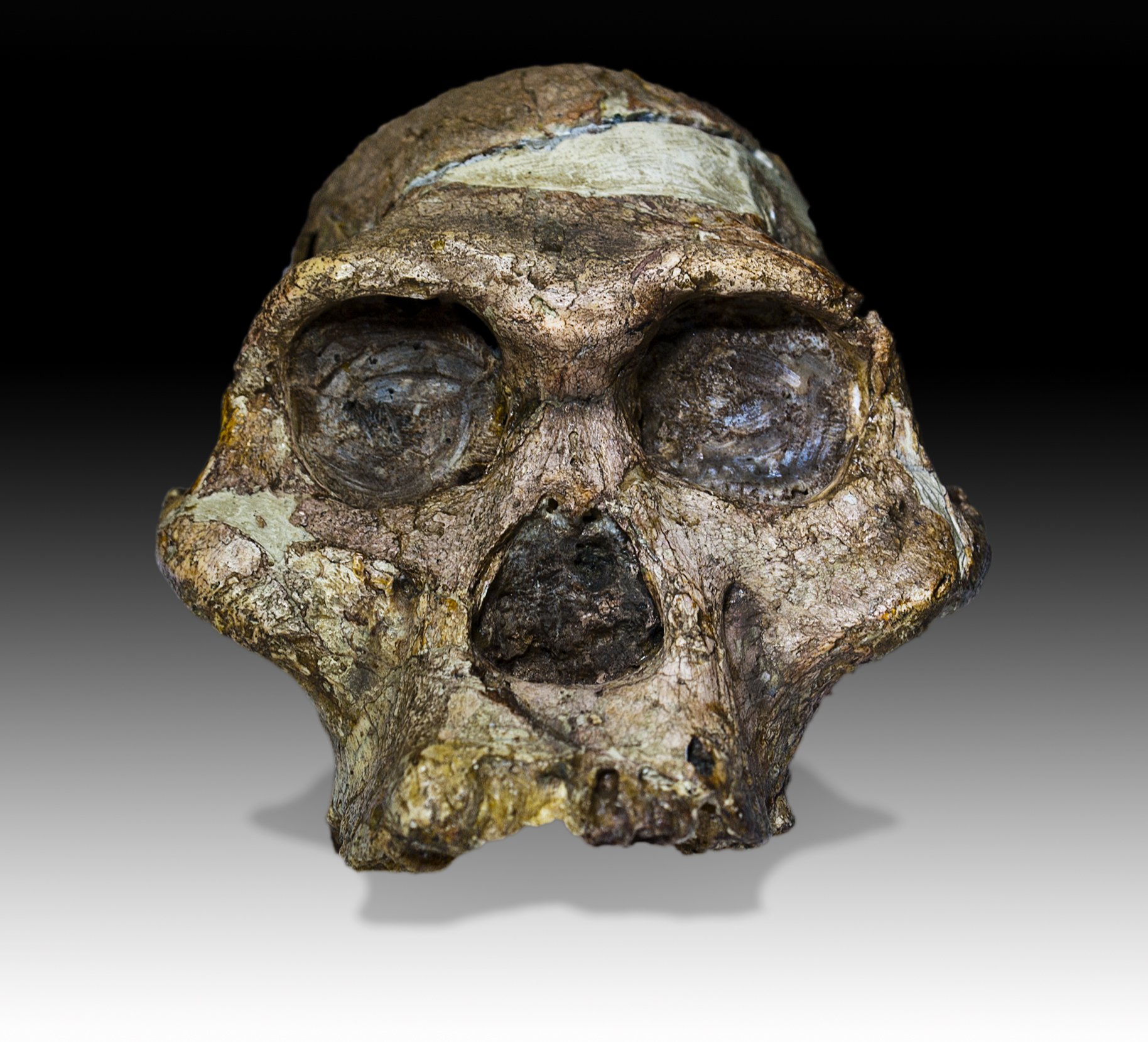
- Catalog no.: STS 5
- Common name: Mrs. Ples
- Species: Australopithecus africanus
- Age: c. 2.35 million years
- Place discovered: Sterkfontein, South Africa
- Date discovered: 18 April 1947
- Discovered by: Robert Broom and John T. Robinson

Mrs. Ples is the popular nickname for the most complete skull of an Australopithecus africanus ever found in South Africa. Many Australopithecus fossils have been found near Sterkfontein, about 40 kilometres (25 mi) northwest of Johannesburg, in a region of Gauteng (part of the old Transvaal) now designated as the Cradle of Humankind World Heritage Site. Mrs. Ples was discovered by Robert Broom and John T. Robinson on April 18, 1947. Because of Broom's use of dynamite and pickaxe while excavating, Mrs. Ples's skull was blown into pieces and some fragments are missing. Nonetheless, Mrs./Mr. Ples is one of the most "perfect" pre-human skulls ever found. The skull is currently held at the Ditsong National Museum of Natural History in Pretoria.

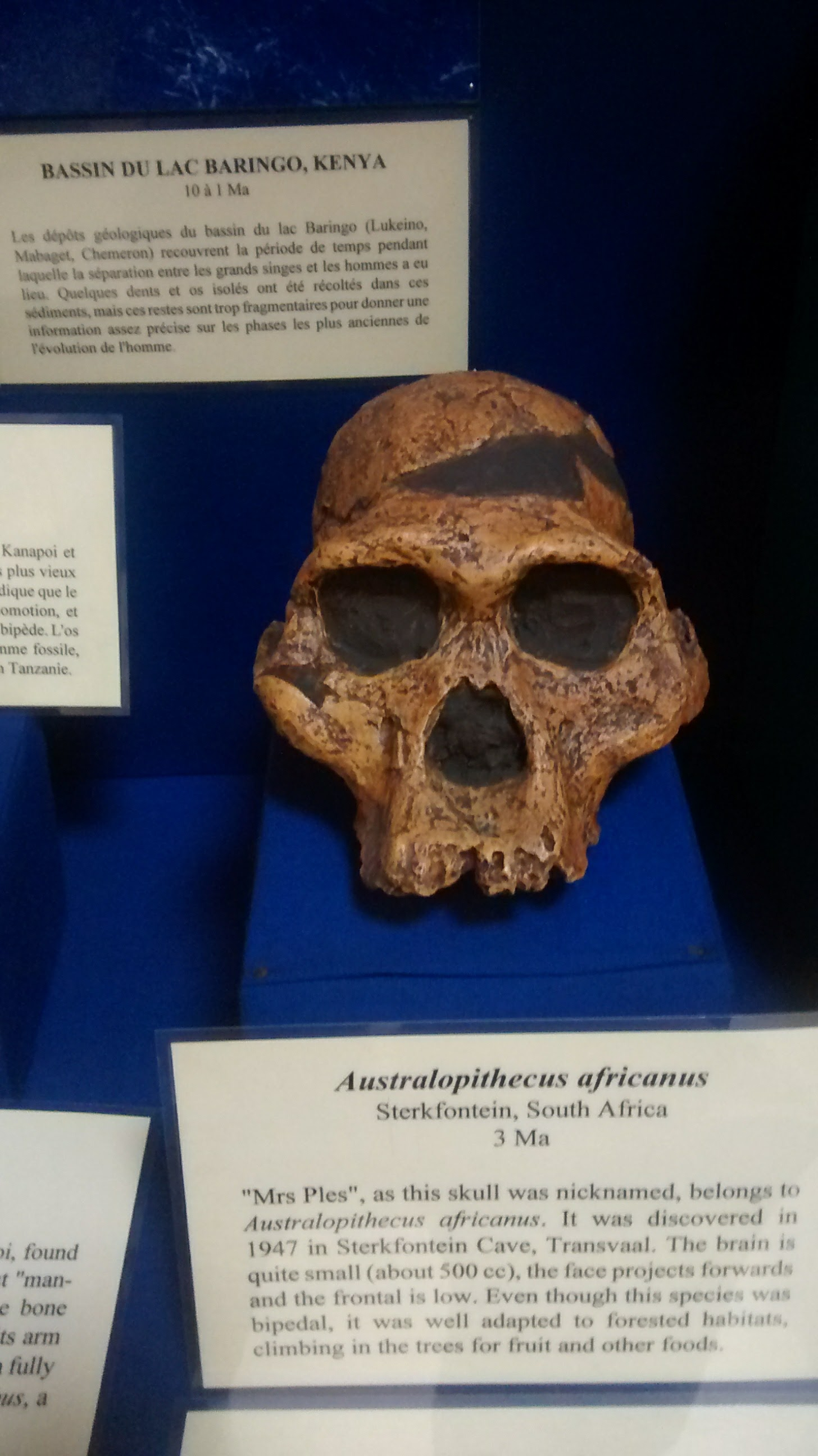
Australopithecus africanus at Ugandan National Museum

The nickname "Mrs. Ples" was coined by Broom's young co-workers. It derives from the scientific name Plesianthropus transvaalensis (near-man from the Transvaal), that Broom initially gave the skull, later subsumed (synonymized) into the species Australopithecus africanus. In scientific publications, the specimen is referred to by its catalogue number, STS 5.

The genus Australopithecus, of which there are several species, is considered the likely precursor of the genus Homo. Though its cranium is comparable to a chimpanzee's, Australopithecus walked upright, as humans do. This was a surprise to anthropologists at the time, because it had been assumed that the big brain of Homo had preceded, or at least evolved in tandem with, our upright gait. Mrs. Ples, whose cranial capacity is only about 485 cubic centimetres (29.6 cubic inches), was one of the first fossils to reveal that upright walking had evolved well before any significant growth in brain size.

The sex of the specimen is not completely certain and so Mrs. Ples may in fact be Mr. Ples. Moreover, X-ray analysis of the specimen's teeth (see below) has suggested it was an adolescent. Hence a designation of Miss Ples or Master Ples is also possible.

The paleoanthropologist Prof. Frederick E. Grine has studied the dental morphology of Mrs./Mr. Ples with a view to finally establishing Mrs./Ms. Ples's sex. Using the Computed Tomography (CT) scans of STS 5 from the experiments of Weber et al., (2012) they compared them to CT scans of more recently discovered A. africanus skulls from Sterkfontein. These scans allowed Grine to reconstruct the roots of the teeth, in order to see how the molar and canine teeth developed. This study concluded that Mrs./Mr. Ples was indeed a middle-aged female. However, the question is not entirely settled, since other studies have come to the opposite conclusion.

Some experts have suggested that a partial skeleton, known only by its catalogue number of STS 14, which was discovered in the same year, in the same geological deposit and in proximity to Mrs. Ples, may belong to this skull. If correct, this would make Mrs. Ples the South African counterpart to the famous Lucy fossil. This skull, along with others discovered at Taung, Sterkfontein, and Makapansgat offered compelling evidence in favour of Charles Darwin's hypothesis that humanity's origin lay in Africa.

The fossil was originally dated by a combination of palaeomagnetism and uranium-lead techniques to 2.1-2.6 million years ago. A 2022 study dating surrounding rocks with a new methodology, stated their age as 3.4-3.7 million years old.

In 2004, Mrs. Ples was voted 95th in the SABC 3's and e.tv's Great South Africans Top 100 list.

== See also ==
- List of human evolution fossils
- Taung Child
