= Silphictidoides =

Silphictidoides Temporal range: Late Permian

Scientific classification
- Domain: Eukaryota
- Kingdom: Animalia
- Phylum: Chordata
- Clade: Synapsida
- Clade: Therapsida
- Clade: †Therocephalia
- Superfamily: †Baurioidea
- Genus: †Silphictidoides; Huene, 1950

Type species
- †Silphictidoides ruhuhuensis Huene, 1950

Extinct genus of therapsids from the Late Permian of Tanzania

Silphictidoides is an extinct genus of therocephalian therapsids from the Late Permian of Tanzania. The type species Silphictidoides ruhuhuensis was named by German paleontologist Friedrich von Huene in 1950 from the Tropidostoma Assemblage Zone. Silphictidoides was once classified within the family Silpholestidae. Silphedolestids are no longer recognized as a valid grouping, and Silphictidoides is now considered a basal member of the clade Baurioidea.
