= Henry McHenry (anthropologist) =

Henry Malcolm McHenry (born May 19, 1944) is a professor of anthropology at the University of California, Davis, specializing in studies of human evolution, the origins of bipedality, and paleoanthropology.

McHenry has published on the comparative relationships among primate fossils. His findings have been featured in scholarly journals, and in publications including Science, The New York Times, Discover and National Geographic. McHenry earned bachelor's and master's degrees at UC Davis before earning his Ph.D. at Harvard.

== Efficient Walker theory ==
Attempting to explain the evolutionary advent of bipedalism among hominids, McHenry and Peter Rodman have advanced the Efficient Walker theory, based on energetic analysis. The scientists compared the efficiency of chimpanzees walking on two versus four legs, finding two legged locomotion was far more efficient. They concluded bipedalism was selected simply because it allowed for a further range of travel for hominids. As Miocene forests decreased and hominids were forced into the savannas, the scientists reason, bipedalism enabled greater access to resources.

== Study of African ancestors ==
McHenry travels regularly to Africa to extend his knowledge of human origins, focusing his studies on the fossil remains of australopithecines. The best-known of which are the 3.2-million-year-old remains of 'Lucy', discovered in 1974 by Donald Johanson of the Institute for Human Origins. According to McHenry, "The earlier species (Lucy) is more primitive in its skull and teeth, but has human-like body proportions," whereas "the later species, africanus, with more human-like skull and teeth, has the more ape-like body proportions--big arms, small legs."

== Publications ==
McHenry has produced over 130 publications, comprising papers, reviews, and contributions to books.

=== Papers ===
Among the papers which McHenry has written or contributed to are the following:

- McHenry, Henry M (1968), "Transverse lines in the long bones of California Indians" (PDF), American Journal of Physical Anthropology, 29 (1): 1–17, doi:10.1002/ajpa.1330290110, PMID 5686934, archived from the original (PDF) on 2010-06-11
- McHenry, Henry M (18 May 1973), "Early hominid humerus from East Rudolf, Kenya" (PDF), Science, 180 (4087): 739–741, Bibcode:1973Sci...180..739M, doi:10.1126/science.180.4087.739, PMID 4702570, S2CID 34626869, archived from the original (PDF) on 12 June 2010
- McHenry, Henry M (24 August 1973), "Australopithecine anatomy. Book review of Early Hominid Posture and Locomotion" (PDF), Science, 181 (4101): 738–739, Bibcode:1973Sci...181..738R, doi:10.1126/science.181.4101.738, archived from the original (PDF) on 12 June 2010
- Henry M. McHenry (1979), "Fore- and Hindlimb Proportions in Plio-Pleistocene Hominids" (PDF), American Journal of Physical Anthropology, 49 (1): 15–22, doi:10.1002/ajpa.1330490104, PMID 98053, archived from the original (PDF) on 2010-06-12
- McHenry, Henry M. (October 1982), "The pattern of human evolution: Studies on bipedalism, mastication, and encephalization" (PDF), Annual Review of Anthropology, 11: 151–173, doi:10.1146/annurev.an.11.100182.001055, archived from the original (PDF) on 2010-06-12
- McHenry, Henry M (March 1991), "Book review of The Human Career: Human biological and cultural origins" (PDF), Evolution, 45 (2): 465–466, doi:10.2307/2409685, ISSN 0014-3820, JSTOR 2409685, archived from the original (PDF) on 2010-06-12
- McHenry, Henry M (1996), "Book review of Human Evolution" (PDF), American Journal of Physical Anthropology, 101 (2): 301–302, doi:10.1002/(sici)1096-8644(199610)101:2<301::aid-ajpa14>3.0.co;2-3, archived from the original (PDF) on 2010-06-12
- Henry M. McHenry (1997), "Book Review (of): Function, Phylogeny, and Fossils: Miocene Hominoid Evolution and Adaptations" (PDF), International Journal of Primatology, 18 (6): 1053–1056, doi:10.1023/A:1026312617465, S2CID 24021738, archived from the original (PDF) on 2010-04-15
- Henry M. McHenry; Catherine Coffing (October 2000), "Australopithecus to Homo: Transformations in Body and Mind" (PDF), Annual Review of Anthropology, 29: 125–46, doi:10.1146/annurev.anthro.29.1.125, archived from the original (PDF) on 2010-06-10
- Henry M. McHenry (2001), "Media Reviews: Encyclopedia of Human Evolution and Prehistory" (PDF), American Journal of Primatology, 55 (2): 131–132, doi:10.1002/ajp.1045, S2CID 84353376, archived from the original (PDF) on 2010-06-12
- McHenry, Henry M (2004), "Book reviews: Origin of human bipedality" (PDF), Evolutionary Anthropology, 13 (3): 116–119, doi:10.1002/evan.20000, archived from the original (PDF) on 2010-06-13
- McHenry, Henry M (2005), "Book review of Walking Upright (2003)" (PDF), International Journal of Primatology, 26 (5): 1209–1211, doi:10.1007/s10764-005-6470-4, S2CID 3234915, archived from the original (PDF) on 2010-06-12
- Henry M. McHenry; Cassandra C. Brown; Lindsay J. McHenry (2007), "Fossil Hominin Ulnae and the Forelimb of Paranthropus" (PDF), American Journal of Physical Anthropology, 134 (2): 209–218, Bibcode:2007AJPA..134..209M, doi:10.1002/ajpa.20656, PMID 17596856, archived from the original (PDF) on 2010-06-12
- McHenry, Henry M.; Cassandra C. Brown (2008), "Side steps: The erratic pattern of hominin postcranial change through time" (PDF), Journal of Human Evolution, 55 (4): 639–651, Bibcode:2008JHumE..55..639M, doi:10.1016/j.jhevol.2008.03.012, PMID 18572223, archived from the original (PDF) on 2010-06-11

=== Books ===
Among the books which McHenry has written or contributed to are the following:

- McHenry, Henry M (1991), "Human evolution" (PDF), in Renato Dulbecco (ed.), Encyclopedia of Human Biology, vol. 3, San Diego: Academic Press, pp. 487–493, ISBN 978-0-12-226756-7, archived from the original (PDF) on 2010-06-12
- Strasser, Elizabeth; John Fleagle; Alfred Rosenberger & Henry M. McHenry, eds. (1998), Primate Locomotion: Recent Advances, New York: Plenum Publishing, ISBN 978-0-306-46022-7 Book review
- McHenry, Henry M (2002), "Introduction to the fossil record of human ancestry" (PDF), in Walter C. Hartwig (ed.), In The Primate Fossil Record, Cambridge: University of Cambridge Press, pp. 401–406, ISBN 978-0-521-66315-1, archived from the original (PDF) on 2010-06-11
- Henry M. McHenry (2009), "Human Evolution" (PDF), in Michael Ruse; Joseph Travis (eds.), Evolution: The First Four Billion Years, Harvard University Press, pp. 256–280, ISBN 978-0-674-03175-3
