= John Talbot Robinson =

South African paleontologist (1923–2001)

- Born: 10 January 1923; Elliot, South Africa
- Died: 12 October 2001 (aged 78); Madison, Wisconsin, US
- Education: University of Cape Town
- Spouse: Sybil Clara Frances Robinson (née Dee)
- Children: Richard John Robinson; Peter Francis Robinson
- Scientific career
- Fields: Hominin paleontologist
- Workplaces: University of Wisconsin–Madison
- Thesis: The Dentition of the Australopithecinae (1955)

John Talbot Robinson FRSSAf (10 January 1923 – 12 October 2001) was a distinguished South African hominin paleontologist. His most famous discovery (with Robert Broom) was the nearly complete fossil skull of the hominin species Australopithecus africanus, known as Mrs. Ples.

== Education and career ==
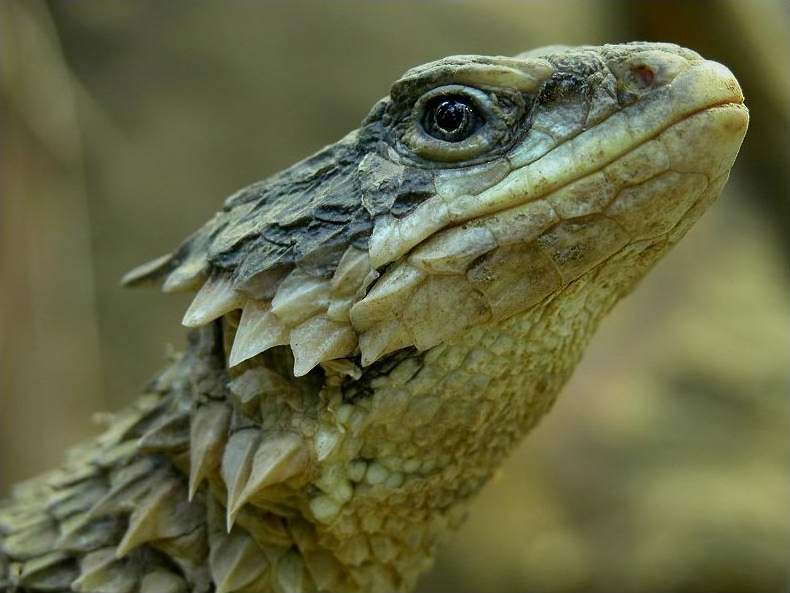
Giant girdled lizard

Robinson was born in Elliot, South Africa to Theodore Clement Robinson and Florence Harriett Robinson (née Selby), both descendants of the British 1820 Settlers. He attended the University of Cape Town where he obtained a BSc in zoology and bacteriology in 1943 and an MSc (zoology) in 1944, with a thesis on the giant girdled lizard (Cordylus giganteus). He contributed to two dissection manuals, one on the clawed frog (Xenopus) and the other on the spiney dogfish shark (Squalus).

He started his doctorate in marine biology in Cape Town and even went so far as to publish descriptions of new diatoms and copepods but he interrupted it by moving to the Transvaal Museum in Pretoria at the end of 1945 to take up the position of "assistant professional officer". He became the assistant to Anthonie Johannes Theodorus Janse, a Lepidoptera specialist (a moth specialist).

The pre-eminent paleontologist Robert Broom was working at the Transvaal Museum at that time and the museum felt that he needed a collection manager as Broom had gotten into the habit of merely memorising contextual information about fossil specimens instead of physically recording the provenance information systematically. It was the Canadian geologist H. B. S. Cooke who suggested that Robinson should assist Broom. This did not please Janse.

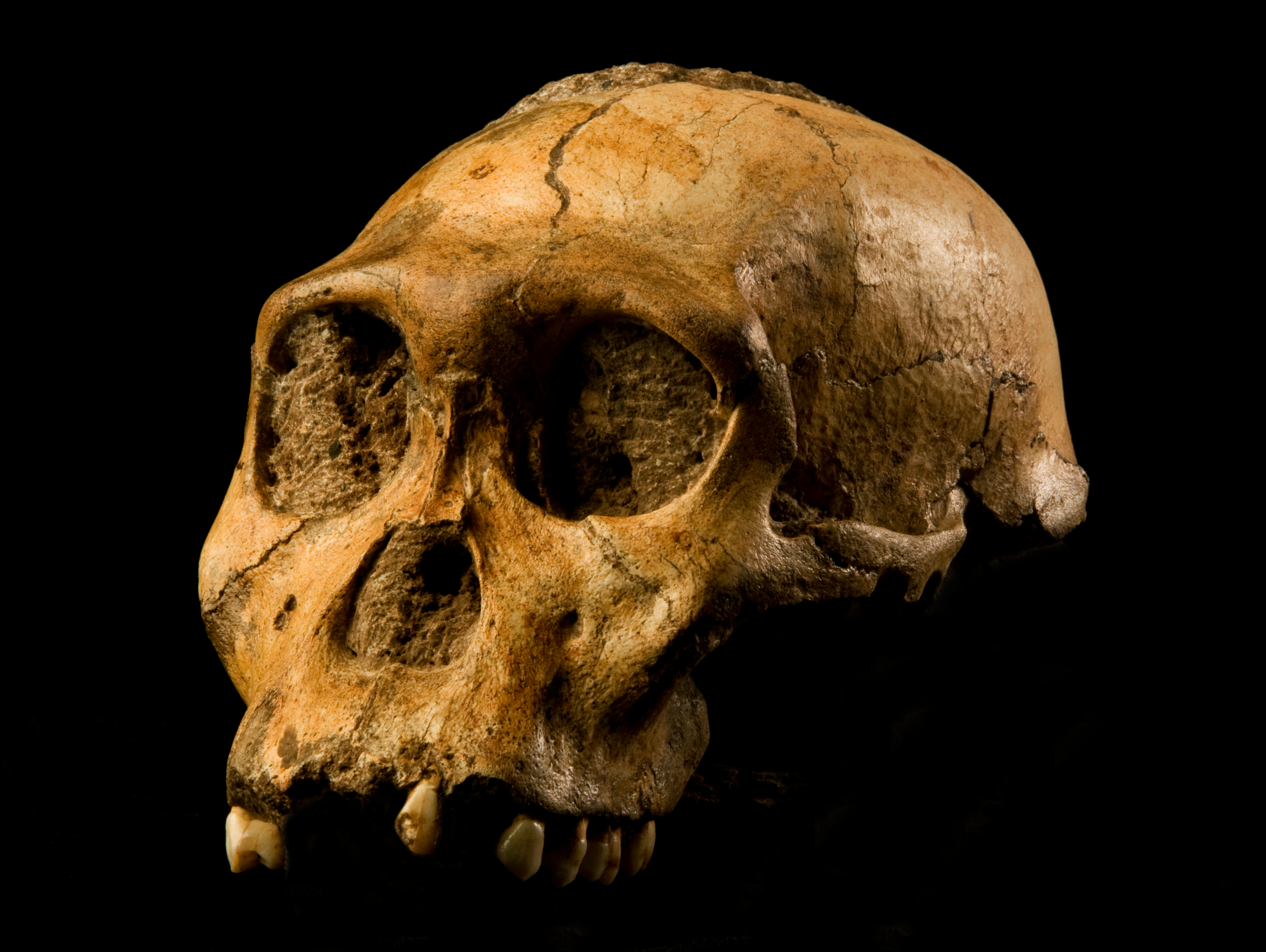
Australopithecus sediba

In April 1946 Robinson became the assistant to Robert Broom and he worked with him for four years until Broom's death in 1951. They focused on excavations at the caves of Sterkfontein (where they discovered "Mrs. Ples" a specimen of Australopithecus africanus, in 1947), Swartkrans (which yielded several fossils of Paranthropus robustus and Telanthropis capensis) and Kromdraai. They discovered over 300 specimens of early humans, the Australopithecinae. Between 1946 and 1952 they jointly published twenty-three books and articles. After Broom's death, Robinson worked with C.K. Brain.

In 1955 Robinson completed his PhD in zoology at the University of Cape Town but with a dissertation "The Dentition of the Australopithecinae", published 1956 and arguably his most important work. He took over as head of the Department of Vertebrate Paleontology and Physical Anthropology and eventually became assistant director of the Transvaal Museum.

In 1963 Robinson began a professorship in zoology and anthropology at the University of Wisconsin–Madison where he remained until his retirement in 1983. He taught courses in evolutionary theory and human origins, zoology and anthropology. He was director of the University of Wisconsin Zoological Museum from 1979 to 1981. Robinson continued to make trips back to South Africa to carry out research.

== Significance of discoveries ==
When Robinson first started collaborating with Broom in 1946 the scientific community was just beginning to accept the fossil ancestors of modern humans that had been found in South Africa but the nature of our early ancestors and the evolutionary trajectory from early primates to australopithecines to modern humans remained unknown. The only substantial australopithecine samples known at that time were excavated by Robinson and Broom since Louis Leakey did not find any fossils in Olduvai Gorge until 1959.

The discovery in 1947 of "Mrs Ples", an essentially complete adult australopithecine skull, led to the conclusion that australopithecines were ancestral to modern humans. Robinson went on to explain the biological adaptations of the australopithecines and put their morphological characteristics into a comprehensive picture of hominid adaptation and evolution. He also established the two lineages of hominids that had existed in the past.

Robinson made the first broad functional analysis of the postcranial anatomy of the australopithecines which established that australopithecines were committed bipeds. He published his finding in the book Early Hominid Posture and Locomotion (1976).

The presence of both Paranthropus robustus and Telanthropis capensis at Swartkrans provided the first evidence of the co-existence of two hominid species in the Pleistocene in Africa. This was later confirmed by other paleontological sites in Africa.

== Personal life ==
He died in Madison, Wisconsin in 2001. He was survived by his wife, Sybil Robinson who was Professor Emeritus of the University of Wisconsin-Madison Department of Theatre and Drama. Their two sons predeceased him.

== See also ==
- Missing link (human evolution)
