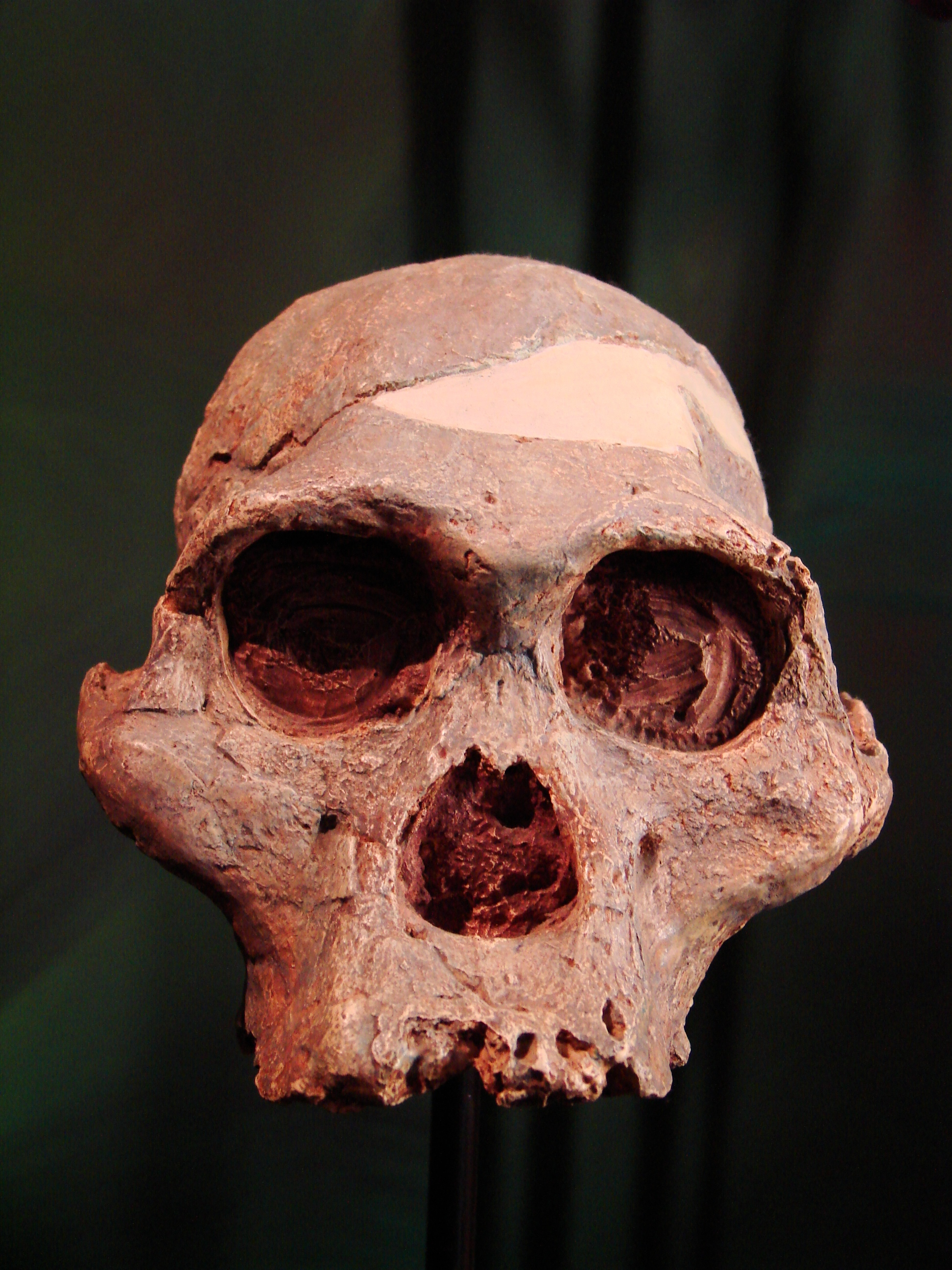
- Mrs. Ples, at the University of Zurich

Scientific classification
- Kingdom: Animalia
- Phylum: Chordata
- Class: Mammalia
- Order: Primates
- Superfamily: Hominoidea
- Family: Hominidae
- Genus: †Australopithecus
- Species: †A. africanus

Binomial name
- †Australopithecus africanus Dart, 1925

Synonyms
- Australopithecus transvaalensis Broom, 1936; Plesianthropus transvaalensis Broom, 1938; Australopithecus prometheus? Dart, 1949

= Australopithecus africanus =

Australopithecus africanus Temporal range: 3.3-2.1 Ma Late Pliocene - Early Pleistocene

Extinct hominid from South Africa

Australopithecus africanus is an extinct species of australopithecine which lived between about 3.3 and 2.1 million years ago in the Late Pliocene to Early Pleistocene of South Africa. The species has been recovered from Taung, Sterkfontein, Makapansgat, and Gladysvale. The first specimen, the Taung Child, was described by anatomist Raymond Dart in 1924, and was the first early hominin found. However, its closer relations to humans than to other apes would not become widely accepted until the middle of the century because most had believed humans evolved outside of Africa. It is unclear how A. africanus relates to other hominins, being variously placed as ancestral to Homo and Paranthropus, to just Paranthropus, or to just P. robustus. The oldest known South African australopith specimen "Little Foot", representing the most completely preserved early hominin with 90% of the skeleton intact, has been controversially suggested to represent A. africanus, its probable junior synonym A. prometheus, or neither of the two taxa.

A. africanus brain volume was about 420–510 cc (26–31 cu in). Like other early hominins, the cheek teeth were enlarged and had thick enamel. Male skulls may have been more robust than female skulls. Males may have been on average 140 cm (4 ft 7 in) in height and 40 kg (88 lb) in weight, and females 125 cm (4 ft 1 in) and 30 kg (66 lb). A. africanus was a competent biped, albeit less efficient at walking than humans. A. africanus also had several upper body traits in common with arboreal non-human apes. This is variously interpreted as either evidence of a partially or fully arboreal lifestyle, or as a non-functional vestige from a more apelike ancestor. The upper body of A. africanus is more apelike than that of the East African A. afarensis.

A. africanus, unlike most other primates, seems to have exploited C4 foods such as grasses, seeds, rhizomes, underground storage organs, or potentially creatures higher up on the food chain. Nonetheless, the species had a highly variable diet, making it a generalist. It may have eaten lower quality, harder foods, such as nuts, in leaner times. To survive, children may have needed nursing during such periods until reaching perhaps 4 to 5 years of age. The species appears to have been patrifocal, with females more likely to leave the group than males. A. africanus lived in a gallery forest surrounded by more open grasslands or bushlands. South African australopithecine remains probably accumulated in caves due to predation by large carnivores (namely big cats), and the Taung child appears to have been killed by a bird of prey. A. africanus probably went extinct due to major climatic variability and volatility and possibly competition with Homo and P. robustus.

== Research history ==
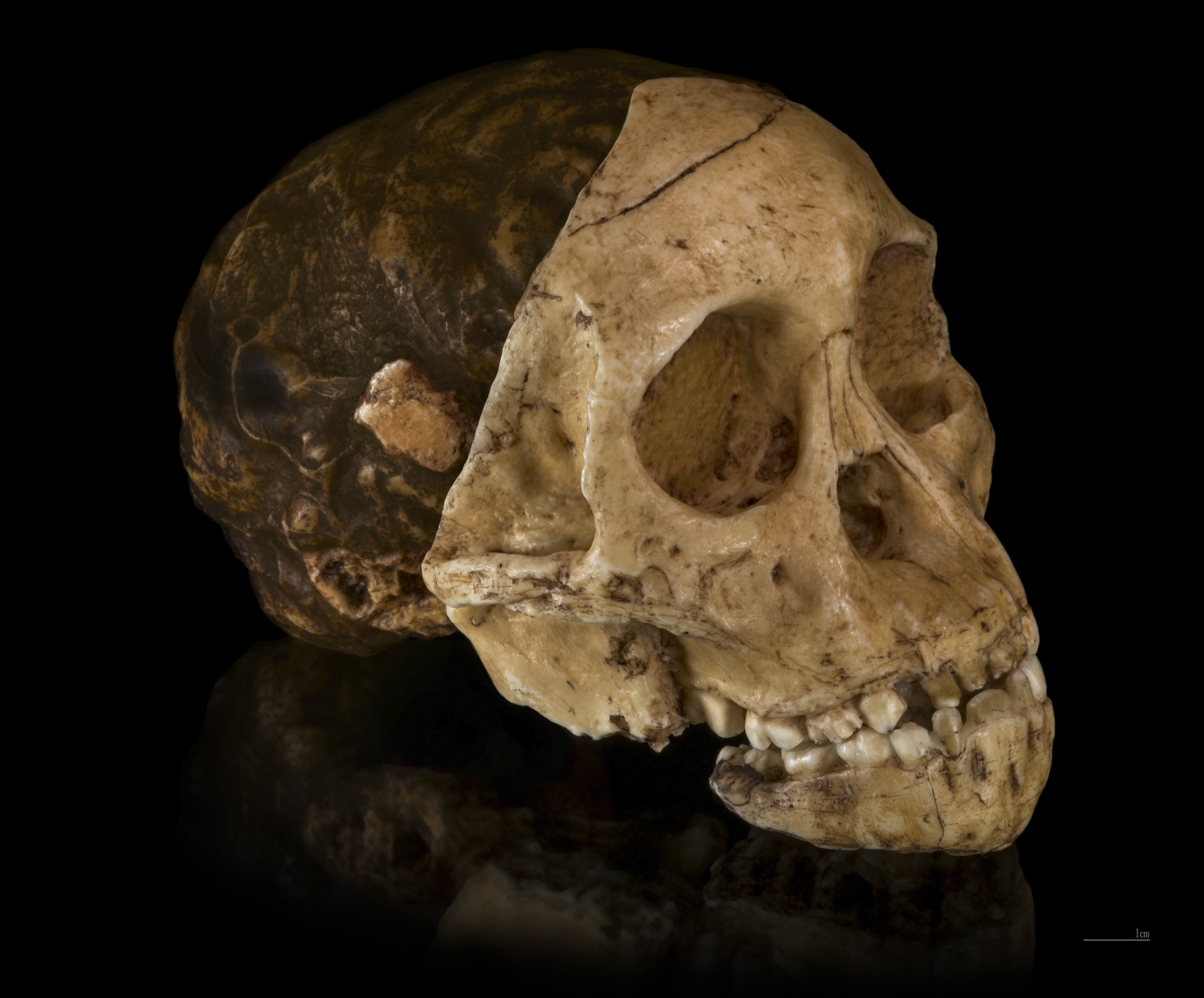
Cast of Taung child from the collection of the University of the Witwatersrand

=== Discovery ===
In 1924, Australian anatomist Professor Raymond Dart, since 1923 working in South-Africa, was informed by one of his students, Josephine Salmons, that monkey fossils (of Papio izodi) had been discovered by shotfirer M.G. de Bruyn in a limestone quarry in Taung, South Africa, operated by the Northern Lime Company. Knowing that Scottish geologist Professor Robert Burns Young was at the time carrying out excavations in the area in search of archaic human remains like Homo rhodesiensis from Kabwe, Zambia (at the time Broken Hill, Northern Rhodesia) discovered in 1921, he asked his colleague to send him some primate remains from the quarry.

On 24 November 1924, Dart received two boxes with fossils collected by De Bruyn. In them, he noticed a natural brain endocast and a face of a, now known to be 2.8 million year old, juvenile skull, the Taung child, that he immediately recognised as a transitional fossil between apes and humans. Most notably, it had a small brain size yet was, as shown by the position of the foramen magnum, bipedal. Dart, after hastily freeing the fossil from its matrix, already in January 1925 named the specimen as a new genus and species: Australopithecus africanus.

=== Classification ===
At the time of discovery, great apes were classified into the family Pongidae encompassing all non-human fossil apes, and Hominidae encompassing humans and ancestors. Dart felt the Taung child fit into neither, and erected the family "Homo-simiadæ" ("man-apes"). This family name was soon abandoned, and Dart proposed "Australopithecidae" in 1929. In 1933, South African palaeoanthropologist Robert Broom suggested moving A. africanus into Hominidae, which at the time contained only humans and their ancestors.

A. africanus was the first evidence that humans evolved in Africa, as Charles Darwin had postulated in his 1871 The Descent of Man. However, Dart's claim of the Taung child as the transitional stage between apes and humans was at odds with the-then popular model of human evolution which held that large brain size and humanlike characteristics had developed rather early on, and that large brain size evolved before bipedalism. Resultantly, A. africanus was generally cast aside as a member of the gorilla or chimpanzee lineages, most notably by Sir Arthur Keith.

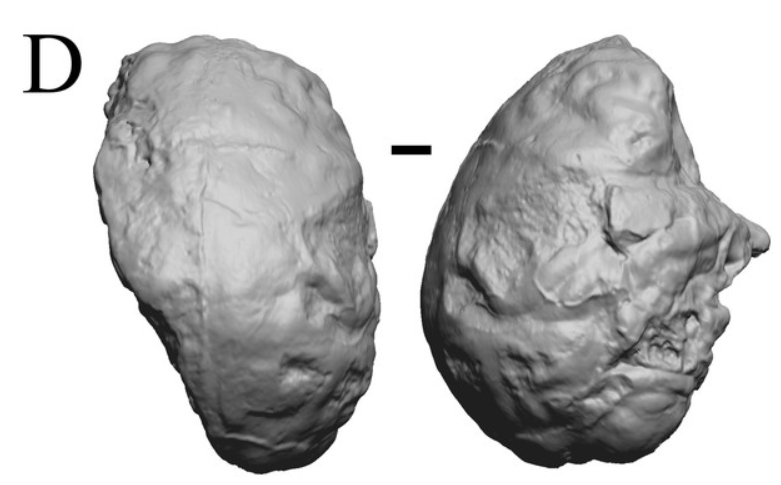
Partial digital endocast of Taung 1.

This view was perpetuated by Charles Dawson's 1912 hoax Piltdown Man hailing from Britain. Further, the discovery of the humanlike Peking Man (Homo erectus pekinensis) in China also seemed to place the origins of humankind outside of Africa. Humanlike characteristics of the Taung child were attributed to the specimen's juvenile status, meaning they would disappear with maturity. Nonetheless, Dart and Broom continued to argue that Australopithecus was far removed from chimpanzees, showing several physical and claiming some behavioural similarities with humans. To this extent, Dart made note of the amalgamations of large mammal bone fragments in australopithecine-bearing caves which are now attributed to hyena activity. However, Dart proposed that the bones were instead evidence of what he named the "osteodontokeratic culture" produced by australopithecine hunters, who manufactured weapons using the long bones, teeth, and horns of large hoofed prey:

On this thesis man's predecessors differed from living apes in being confirmed killers: carnivorous creatures, that seized living quarries by violence, battered them to death, tore apart their broken bodies, dismembered them limb from limb, slaking their ravenous thirst with the hot blood of victims and greedily devouring livid writhing flesh.

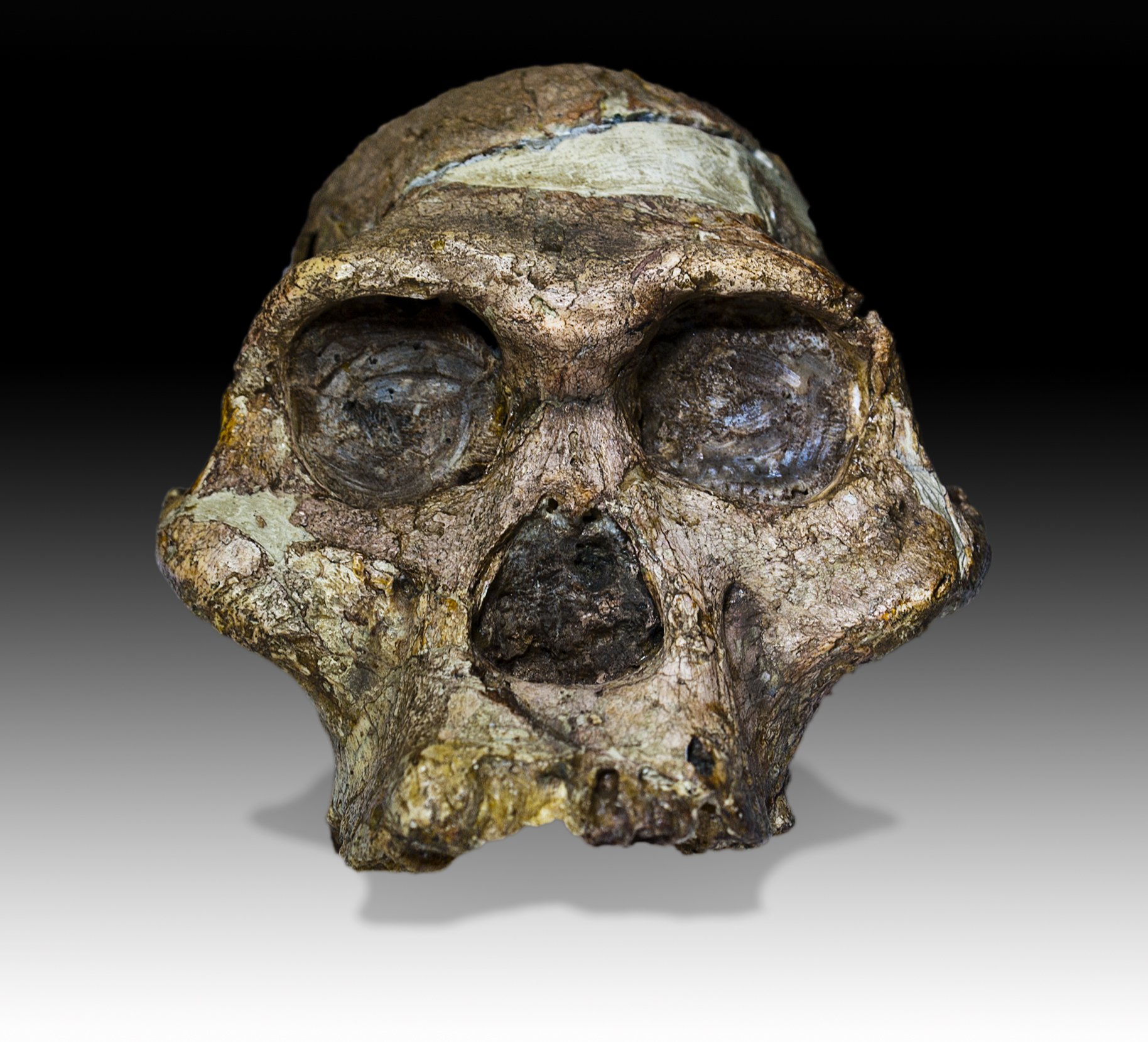
Mrs. Ples at the Ditsong National Museum of Natural History, Pretoria

Broom was one of the few scientists defending the close human affinities of Australopithecus africanus. In 1936, he was informed by two of Dart's students, Trevor R. Jones and G. Schepers, that human-like remains had been discovered in the Sterkfontein Cave quarries. On 9 August 1936, he asked G.W. Barlow to provide him with any finds. On 17 August 1936 he received an adult skull including a natural endocast, specimen Sts 60. However, Broom classified it as a new species, "A. transvaalensis", and in 1938 moved it into a new genus as "Plesianthropus transvaalensis". He also discovered the robust australopithecine Paranthropus robustus, showing evidence of a wide diversity of Early Pleistocene "man-apes". Before World War II, several more sites bore A. africanus fossils. A detailed monograph by Broom and palaeoanthropologist Gerrit Willem Hendrik Schepers in 1946 regarding these australopithecines from South Africa, as well as several papers by British palaeoanthropologist Sir Wilfrid Le Gros Clark, had turned around scientific opinion, garnering wide support for A. africanus' classification as a human ancestor. In 1947, the most complete skull was discovered, STS 5 ("Mrs. Ples"). Wider acceptance of A. africanus prompted re-evaluation of Piltdown Man in 1953, revealing its falsehood.

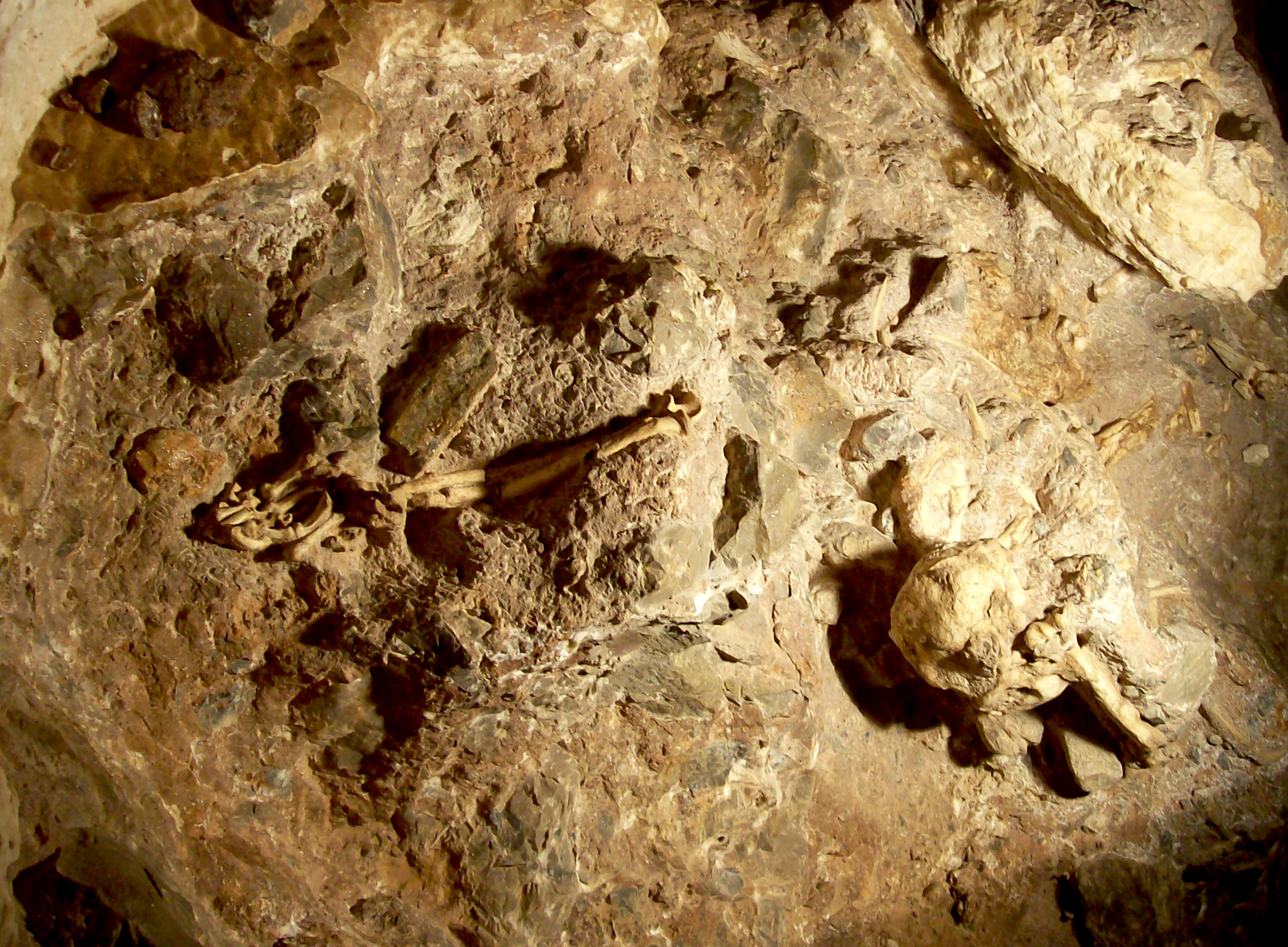
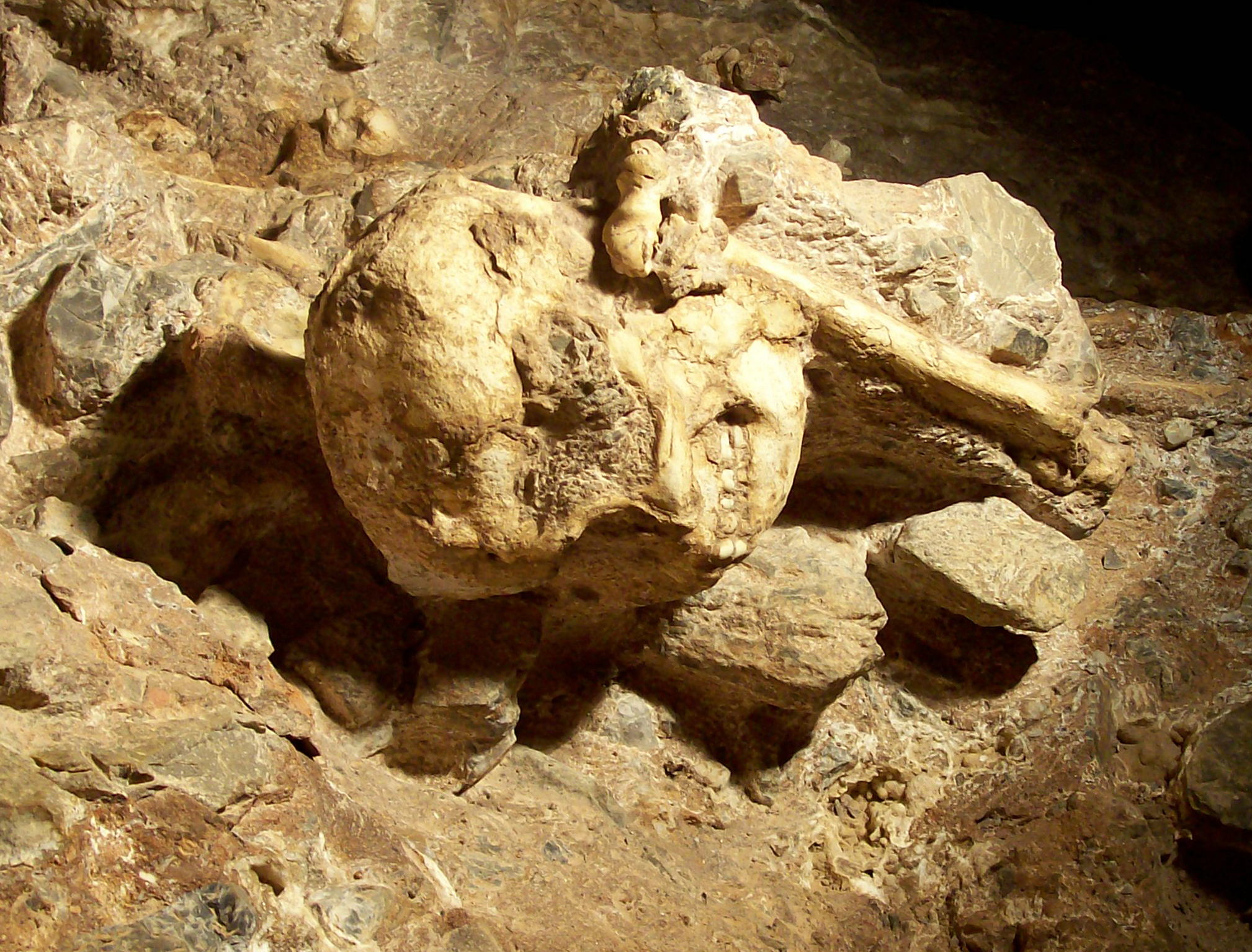
Little Foot skeleton in situ; view of the entire skeleton above and of the skull below

In 1949, Dart recommended splitting a presumed-female facial fragment from Makapansgat, South Africa, (MLD 2) into a new species as "A. prometheus". In 1954, he referred another presumed-female specimen from Makapansgat (a jawbone fragment). However, in 1953, South African palaeontologist John Talbot Robinson believed that splitting species and genera on such fine hairs was unjustified, and that australopithecine remains from East Africa recovered over the previous couple of decades were indistinguishable from "Plesianthropus"/A. africanus. Based on this, in 1955, Dart agreed with synonymising "A. prometheus" with A. africanus because they are already quite similar to each other, and if speciation did not occur across a continent, then it quite unlikely occurred over a couple tens of kilometres according to Dart. The East African remains would be split off into A. afarensis in 1978. In 2008, palaeoanthropologist Ronald J. Clarke recommended reviving "A. prometheus" to house the StW 573 nearly-complete skeleton ("Little Foot"), StS 71 cranium, StW 505 cranium, StW 183 maxilla, StW 498 maxilla and jawbone, StW 384 jawbone, StS 1 palate, and MLD 2. In 2018, palaeoanthropologists Lee Rogers Berger and John D. Hawks considered "A. prometheus" a nomen nudum ("naked name"), and has not been properly described with diagnostic characteristics which separate it from A. africanus. At the time, these remains were dated to 3.3 million years ago in the Late Pliocene. In 2019, Clarke and South African palaeoanthropologist Kathleen Kuman redated StW 573 to 3.67 million years ago, making it the oldest Australopithecus specimen from South Africa. They considered its antiquity further evidence of species distinction, drawing parallels with A. anamensis and A. afarensis from Middle Pliocene East Africa. Little foot is the most complete early hominin skeleton ever recovered, with about 90% preserved.

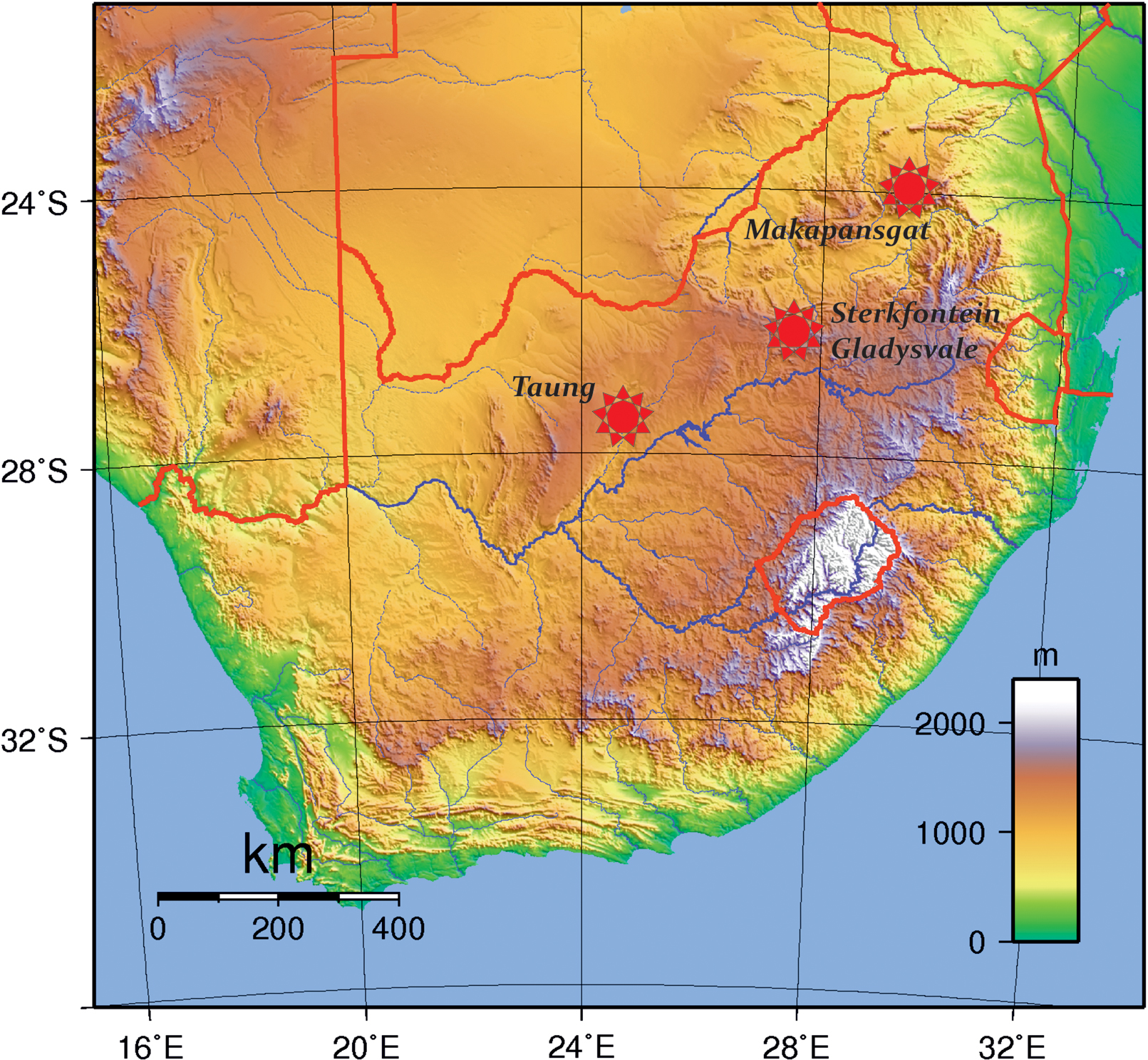
Locations of A. africanus discoveries

In addition to Taung, Sterkfontein, and Makapansgat, A. africanus was in 1992 discovered in Gladysvale Cave. The latter three are in the Cradle of Humankind. Many hominin specimens traditionally assigned to A. africanus have been recovered from Sterkfontein Member 4 (including Mrs. Ples and 2 partial skeletons), previously dated to 2.8 to 2.15 million years ago. But in 2022 a team including Clarke and Kuman used cosmogenic nuclide techniques to date Member 4 at 3.4 million years, which it says discredits the assumption that A. africanus descended from A. afarensis. However, given the wide range of variation exhibited by these specimens, it is debated if all these elements can be confidently assigned to only A. africanus.

At present, the classification of australopithecines is in disarray. Australopithecus is considered a grade taxon, whose members are united by their similar physiology rather than close relations with each other over other hominin genera. It is unclear how A. africanus relates to other hominins. The discovery of Early Pleistocene Homo in Africa during the latter half of the 20th century placed humanity's origins on the continent and A. africanus as ancestral to Homo. The discovery of A. afarensis in 1978, at the time the oldest known hominin, prompted a hypothesis that A. africanus was ancestral to P. robustus, and A. afarensis was the last common ancestor between Homo and A. africanus/P. robustus. It is also suggested that A. africanus is closely related to P. robustus but not to the other Paranthropus species in East Africa, or that A. africanus is ancestral to all Paranthropus. A. africanus has also been postulated to have been ancestral to A. sediba which also inhabited the Cradle of Humankind, perhaps contemporaneously. A. sediba is also postulated to have been ancestral to Homo, which if correct would indeed put A. africanus in an ancestral position to Homo.

African Hominin timeline

== Anatomy ==
=== Skull ===
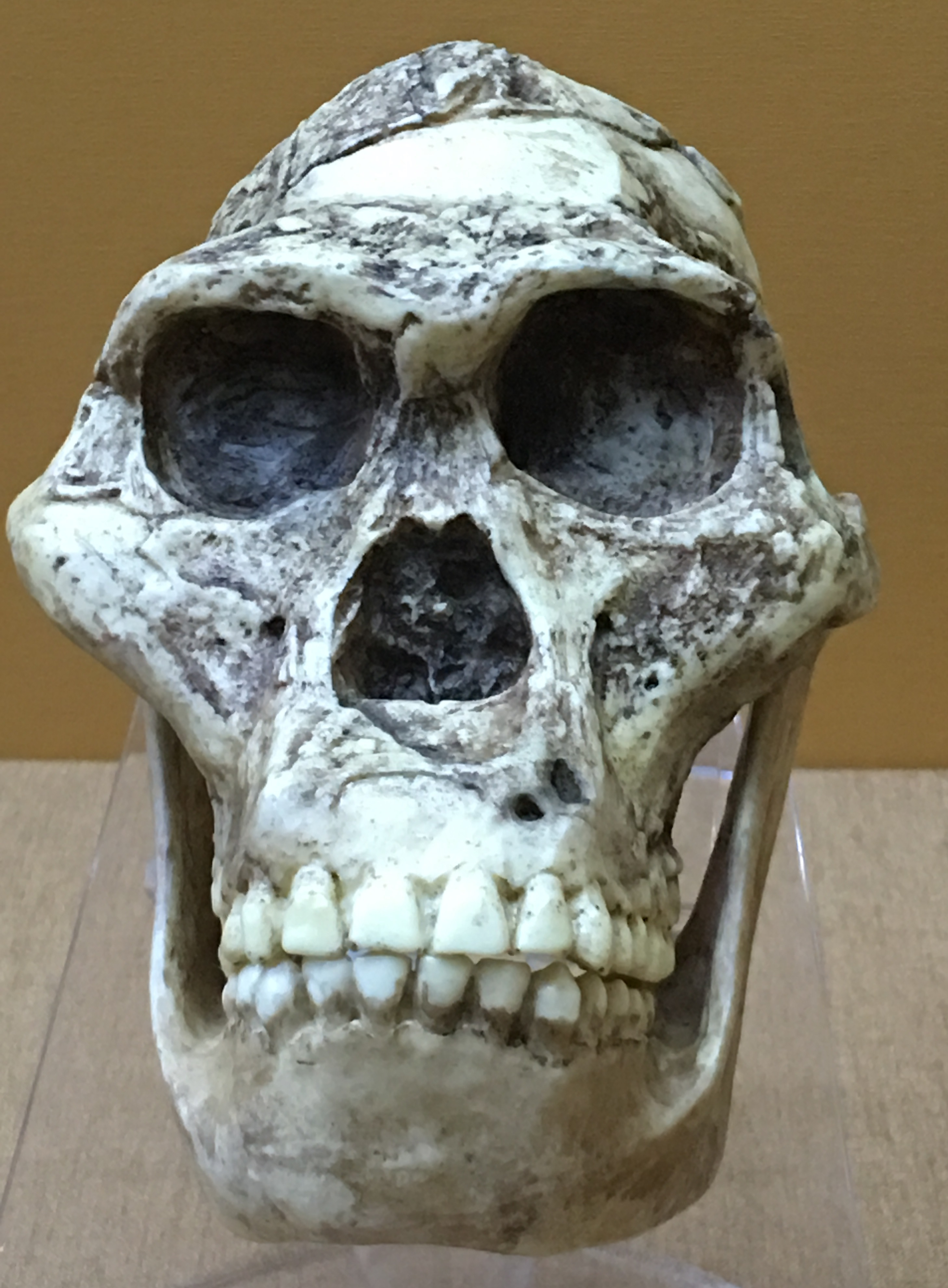
Reconstructed skull of Mrs. Ples at the Beijing Museum of Natural History

Based on 4 specimens, the A. africanus brain volume averaged about 420–510 cc (26–31 cu in). Based on this, neonatal brain size was estimated to have been 165.5–190 cc (10.10–11.59 cu in) using trends seen in adult and neonate brain size in modern primates. If correct, this would indicate that A. africanus was born with about 38% of its total brain size, which is more similar to non-human great apes at 40% than humans at 30%. The inner ear has wide semicircular canals like non-human apes, as well as loose turns at the terminal end of the cochlea like humans. Such a mix may reflect habitual locomotion both in the trees and walking while upright because inner ear anatomy affects the vestibular system (sense of balance).

A. africanus had a prognathic jaw (it jutted out), a somewhat dished face (the cheek were inflated, causing the nose to be at the bottom of a dip), and a defined brow ridge. The temporal lines running across either side of the braincase are raised as small crests. The canines are reduced in size compared to non-human apes, though still notably bigger than those of modern humans. Like other early hominins, the cheek teeth are large and feature thick enamel. In the upper jaw the third molar is the largest molar, and in the lower jaw it is the second molar. A. africanus had a fast, apelike dental development rate. According to Clarke, the older "A. prometheus" is distinguished by larger and more bulbous cheek teeth, larger incisors and canines, more projecting cheeks, more widely spaced eye sockets, and a sagittal crest. A. africanus has a wide range of variation for skull features, which is typically attributed to moderate to high levels of sexual dimorphism in that males were more robust than females.

=== Build ===
In 1992, American anthropologist Henry McHenry estimated an average weight (when assuming humanlike or apelike body proportions, respectively) of 40.8 or 52.8 kg (90 or 116 lb) for males based on five partial leg specimens, and 30.2 or 36.8 kg (67 or 81 lb) for females based on seven specimens. In 2015, American anthropologist William L. Jungers and colleagues similarly reported an average weight (without attempting to distinguish males from females) of 30.7 kg (68 lb) with a range of 22.8–43.3 kg (50–95 lb) for weight based on 19 specimens. Based on seven specimens, McHenry estimated that males, on average, grew to 138 cm (4 ft 6 in) tall and females 125 cm (4 ft 1 in). In 2017, based on 24 specimens, anthropologist Manuel Will and colleagues estimated a height of 124.4 cm (4 ft 1 in) with a range of 110–142 cm (3 ft 7 in – 4 ft 8 in). The elderly, probably female StW 573 was estimated to have stood about 130 cm (4 ft 3 in).

Based on the A. afarensis skeleton DIK-1-1, australopiths are thought to have had a humanlike spine, with 7 neck vertebrae, 12 thoracic vertebrae, and (based on other early australopith skeletons) 5 flexible lumbar vertebrae. In StW 573, the atlas bone in the neck, important for swiveling and stabilising the head, is more similar to non-human apes and indicates greater mobility to swivel up and down than in humans. Such motion is important for arboreal species to locate and focus on climbable surfaces. The StW 573 atlas shows similar mechanical advantages for the muscles which move the shoulder girdle as chimps and gorillas, which may indicate less lordosis (normal curvature of the spine) in A. africanus neck vertebrae. However, the later StW 679 has some similarities to human atlases, which could potentially indicate gradual evolution away from the ape condition. StW 573 has a narrow thoracic inlet unlike A. afarensis and humans. The clavicle is proportionally quite long, with a similar absolute length to that of modern humans.

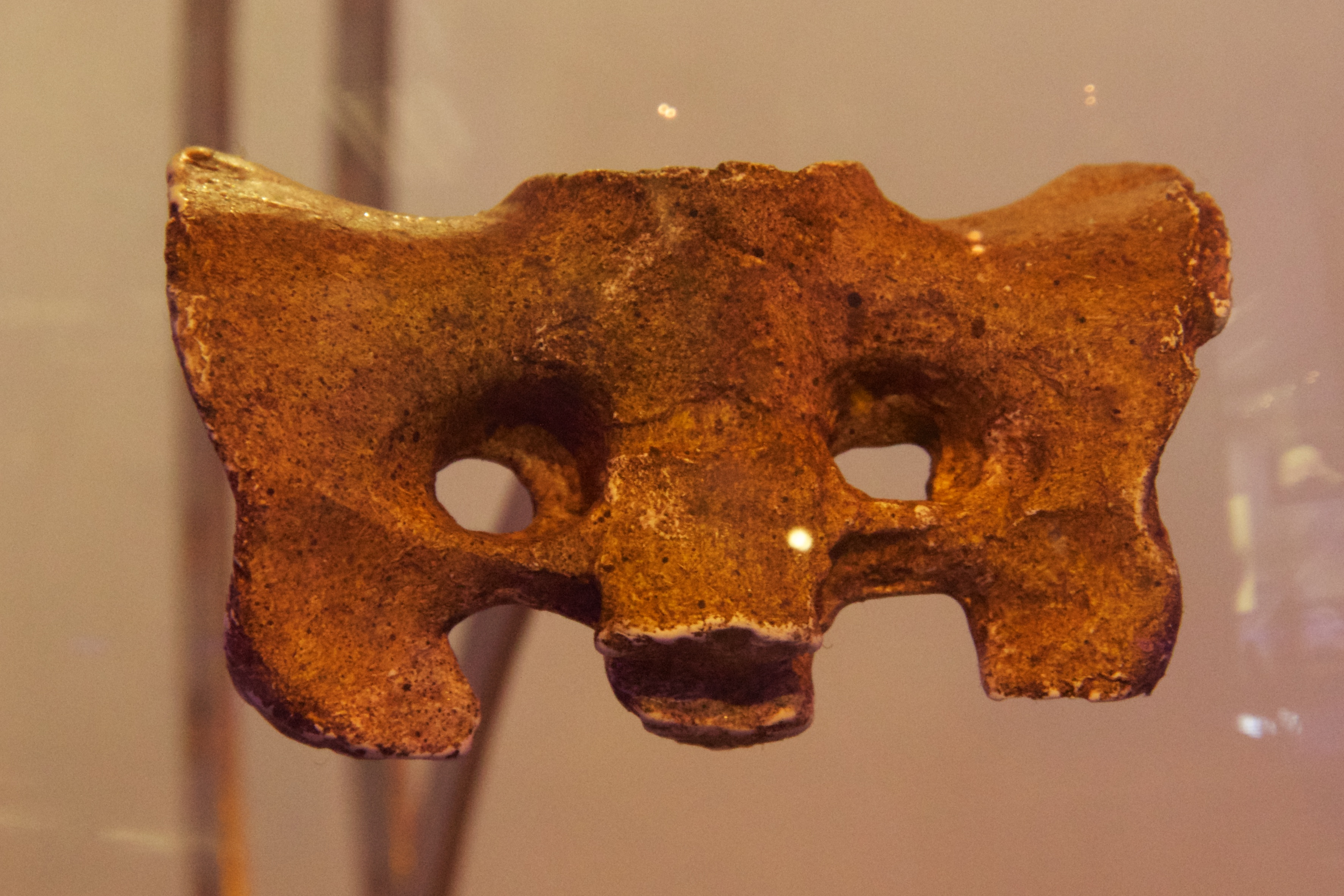
Sts 14 sacrum

Like in modern women, L3–L5 curve outwards in specimen StS 14, whereas these are straighter in StW 431 as in modern men. This probably reflects reinforcement of the female spine to aid in walking upright while pregnant. The StS 14 partial skeleton preserves a rather complete pelvis. Like in the restored pelvis of the Lucy specimen (A. afarensis), the sacrum was relatively flat and orientated more towards the back than in humans, and the pelvic cavity had an overall platypelloid shape. This could indicate a broad birth canal compared to neonate head size, and thus a non-rotational birth (unlike humans), though this is debated. When standing, the angle between the sacrum and the lumbar vertebrae was reconstructed to have been about 148.7°, which is much more similar to that of chimps (154.6°) than humans (118.3°). This would indicate A. africanus standing posture was not as erect as in humans.

=== Limbs ===
The A. africanus hand and arm exhibit a mosaic anatomy, with some aspects more similar to humans and others to non-human apes. It is unclear if this means australopiths were still arboreal to a degree, or if these traits were simply inherited from the human–chimpanzee last common ancestor. Nonetheless, A. africanus exhibits a more ape-like upper limb anatomy than A. afarensis, and is typically interpreted as having been, to some extent, arboreal. Like in arboreal primates, the fingers are curved, the arms relatively long and the shoulders are in a shrugging position. The A. africanus shoulder is most like that of orangutans, and well suited for maintaining stability and bearing weight while raised and placed overhead. However, the right clavicle of StW 573 has a distinctly S-shaped (sigmoid) curve like humans, which indicates a humanlike moment arm for stabilising the shoulder girdle against the humerus. The A. africanus arm bones are consistent with powerful muscles useful in climbing. Nonetheless, the brachial index (the forearm to humerus ratio) is 82.8–86.2 (midway between chimpanzees and humans), which indicates a reduction in forearm length from the more ancient hominin Ardipithecus ramidus. The thumb and wrist indicate humanlike functionality with a precision grip and forceful opposition between the thumb and fingers. The adoption of such a grip is typically interpreted as an adaptation for tool making at the expense of efficient climbing and arboreal habitation.

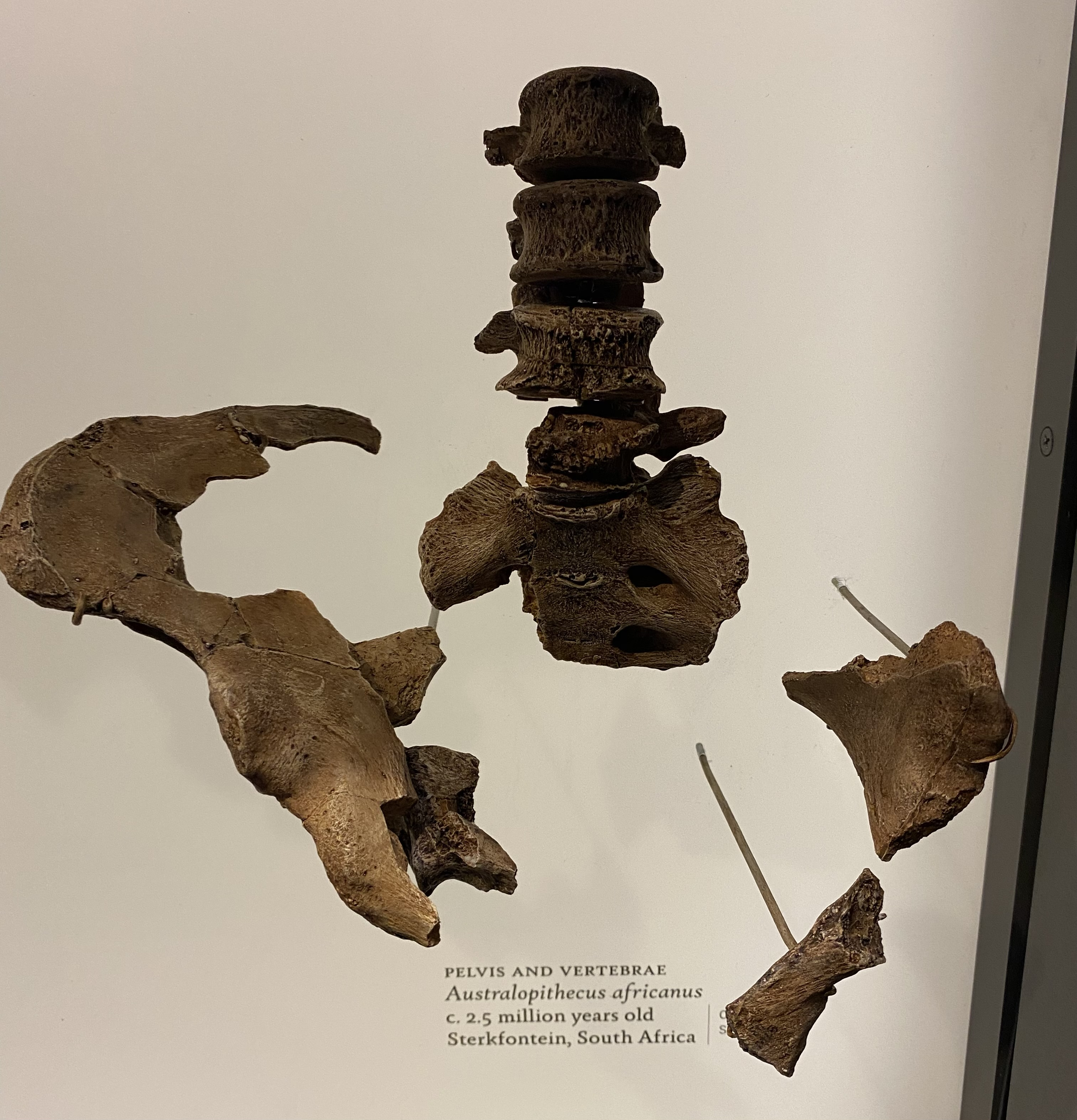
Australopithecus africanus pelvis and vertebrae at the American Museum of Natural History

The leg bones clearly show that A. africanus habitually engaged in bipedal locomotion, though some aspects of the tibiae are apelike, which could indicate that the leg musculature had not been fully reorganised into the human condition. If correct, its functional implications are unclear. The trabecular bone at the hip joint is distinctly humanlike, which would be inconsistent with the great degrees of hip loading required in prolonged arboreal activity. The tibia met the foot at a similar angle as it does in humans, which is necessary for habitual bipedalism. Consequently, the ankle was not as adept for climbing activities as it is in non-human apes. However, the modern Congo Twa hunter–gatherers can achieve a chimp-like angle with the ankle while climbing trees due to the longer fibres in the gastrocnemius (calf) muscle instead of specific skeletal adaptations. Some aspects of the ankle bone were apelike which may have affected walking efficiency. The foot elements of A. africanus are largely known from remains from Sterkfontein Member 4. The foot is humanlike with a stiff midfoot and lack of a midtarsal break (which allows non-human apes to lift the heel independently from the rest of the foot). Though A. africanus had an adducted big toe (it was not dextrous) like humans, A. africanus likely did not push off with the big toe, using the side of the foot instead. StW 573 is the oldest hominin specimen with an adducted big toe. The specimen StW 355 is the most curved proximal foot phalanx bone of any known hominin, more similar to that of orangutans and siamangs.

The arms of StW 573 were about 53.4 cm (1 ft 9 in), and her legs 61.5 cm (2 ft 0 in). This means the arm was 86.9% the length of the leg. She is the first and only early hominin specimen to definitively show that the arms were almost all long as the legs. Nonetheless, these proportion are more similar to humans than non-human apes, with humans at 64.5–78%, chimpanzees about 100%, gorillas 100–125%, and orangutans 135–150.9%.

== Palaeobiology ==
=== Diet ===
In 1954, Robinson proposed that A. africanus was a generalist omnivore whereas P. robustus was a specialised herbivore; and in 1981, American palaeoanthropologist Frederick E. Grine suggested that P. robustus specialised on hard foods such as nuts whereas A. africanus on softer foods such as fruits and leaves. Based on carbon isotope analyses, A. africanus had a highly variable diet which included a notable amount of C_{4} savanna plants such as grasses, seeds, rhizomes, underground storage organs, or perhaps grass-eating invertebrates (such as locusts or termites), grazing mammals, or insectivores or carnivores. Most primates do not eat C_{4} plants. More recent carbon and nitrogen isotope analysis of A. africanus specimens from Sterkfontein has suggested that mammal meat was not a significant component of their diet. A. africanus facial anatomy seems to suggest adaptations for producing high stress on the premolars, useful for eating small, hard objects such as seeds and nuts that need to be cracked open by the teeth, or for processing a large quantity of food at one time. However, like for P. robustus, microwear analysis on the cheek teeth indicate small, hard foods were infrequently eaten, probably as fall back foods during leaner times. Still, A. africanus, like chimps, may have required hammerstones to crack open nuts (such as marula nuts), though A. africanus is not associated with any tools.

A. africanus conspicuously lacks evidence of dental cavities, whereas P. robustus seems to have had a modern humanlike cavity rate; this could possibly indicate that A. africanus either did not often consume high-sugar cavity-causing foods—such as fruit, honey, and some nuts and seeds—or frequently consumed gritty foods which decrease cavity incidence rate. However, the 2nd right permanent incisor (STW 270) and right canine (STW 213) from the same individual show lesions consistent with acid erosion, which indicates this individual was regularly biting into acidic foods such as citrus. Tubers could have caused the same damage if some chewing was done by the front teeth.

Barium continually deposits onto A. africanus teeth until about 6–9 months of development, and then decreases until about 12 months. Because the barium was most likely sourced from breast milk, this probably reflects the weaning age. This is comparable to the human weaning age. Following this initial period, barium deposits stall and then restart cyclically every year for several years. In the first molar specimen StS 28 (from Sterkfontein), this occurred every 6–9 months, and in the lower canine specimen StS 51 every 4–6 months, and this carried on until 4–5 years of development. Lithium and strontium also deposit cyclically. Cyclical barium, lithium, and strontium bands occur in modern primates—for example, wild orangutans up to 9 years of age—which is caused by seasonal famine when a child has to rely on nursing to sustain themselves and less desirable fallback foods. However, it is unclear if this can be extended to A. africanus. δ^{44/42}Ca values in A. africanus enamel reveal that consumption of foods other than breastmilk began shortly after birth in this species, and that non-milk foods made up a significant proportion of the diet of even very young A. africanus.

=== Society ===
The group dynamics of australopithecines is difficult to predict with any degree of accuracy. A 2011 strontium isotope study of A. africanus teeth from the dolomite Sterkfontein Valley found that, assuming that especially small teeth represented female specimens and especially large teeth males, females were more likely to leave their place of birth (patrilocal). This is similar to the dispersal patterns of modern-day hominins which have a multi-male kinship-based society, as opposed to the harem society of gorillas and other primates. However, the small canines of males compared to those of females would seem to suggest a much lower degree of male–male aggression than non-human hominins. Males did not seem to have ventured very far from the valley, which could either indicate small home ranges, or that they preferred dolomitic landscapes due to perhaps cave abundance or factors related to vegetation growth.

=== Pathology ===
In a sample of ten A. africanus specimens, seven exhibited mild to moderate alveolar bone loss resulting from periodontal disease (the wearing away of the bone which supports the teeth due to gum disease). The juvenile specimen STS 24a was diagnosed with an extreme case of periodontal disease on the right side of the mouth, which caused pathological bone growth around the affected site, and movement of the first two right molars during cyclical periods of bacterial infection and resultant inflammation. Similarly, the individual appears to have preferred to chew using the left side of the jaw. The periodontal disease would have severely hindered chewing, particularly in the last year of life, and the individual potentially may have relied on group members to survive for as long as it did.

Evidence of dental erosion has been described in an individual of A. africanus in the form of grooves on the labial root surface of a lateral mandibular incisor and canine. This likely resulted from excess consumption of acidic foods by this individual.

In 1992, anthropologists Geoffrey Raymond Fisk and Gabriele Macho interpreted the left ankle bone Stw 363 as bearing evidence of a healed calcaneal fracture on the heel bone (which was not preserved), which they believed resulted from a fall from a tree. If correct, then the individual was able to survive for a long time despite losing a great deal of function in the left leg. However, they also noted that similar damage could potentially have also been inflicted by calcite deposition and crystallisation during the fossilisation process. Calcaneal fractures have been recorded in humans, and are present quite often in arboreal primates.

== Palaeoecology ==
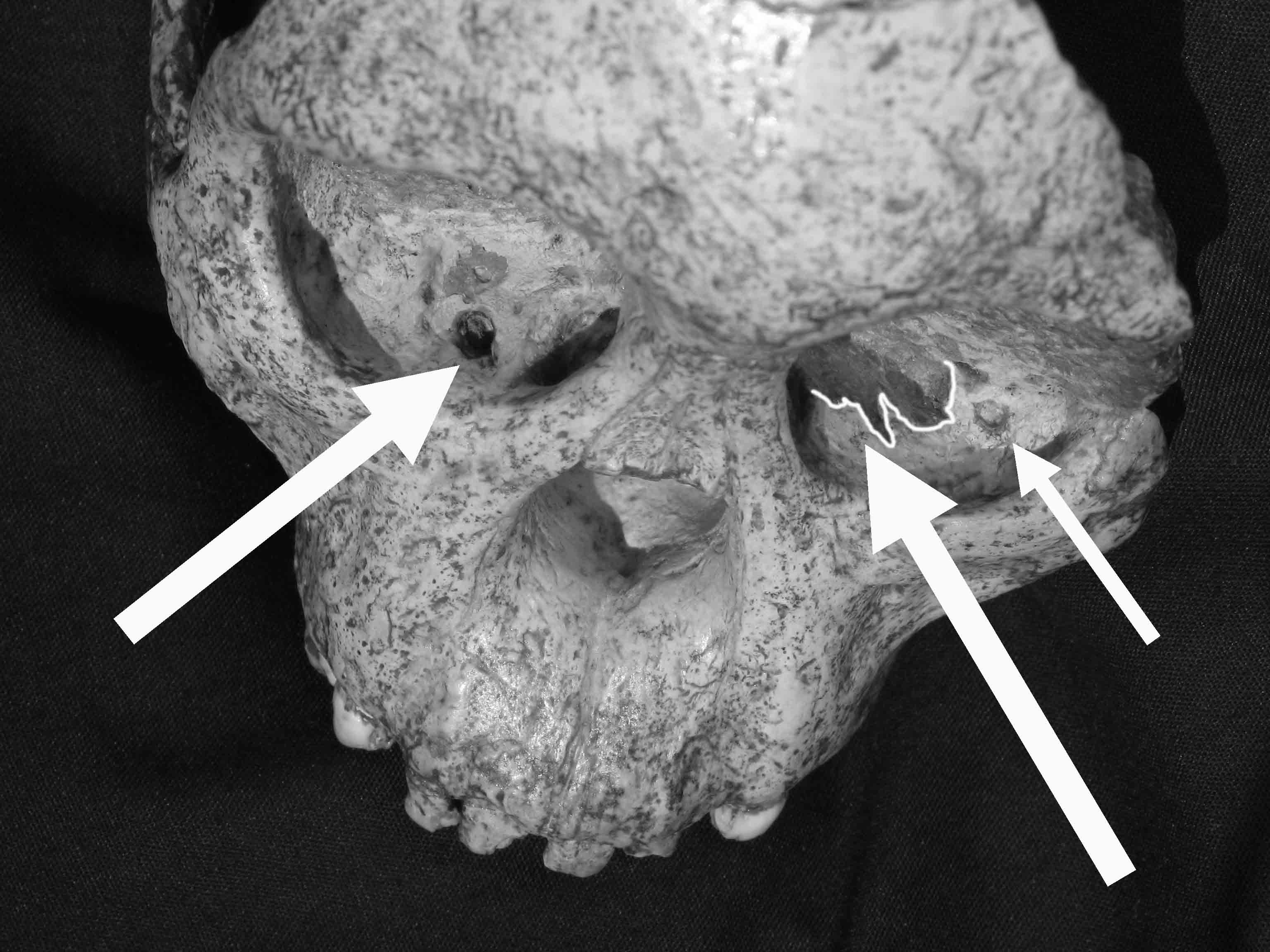
Taung child skull noting raptor-inflicted damage to the eye sockets

South African australopithecines appear to have lived in an area with a wide range of habitats. At Sterkfontein, fossil wood belonging to the liana Dichapetalum cf. mombuttense was recovered. The only living member of this tree genus in South Africa is Dichapetalum cymosum, which grows in dense, humid gallery forests. In modern day, D. mombuttense only grows in the Congolian rainforests, so its presence could potentially mean the area was an extension of this rainforest. The wildlife assemblages indicate a mix of habitats such as bush savanna, open woodland, or grassland. The shrub Anastrabe integerrima was also found, which today only grows on the wetter South African coastline. This could indicate the Cradle of Humankind received more rainfall in the Plio-Pleistocene. In total, the Cradle of Humankind may have featured gallery forests surrounded by grasslands. Taung also appears to have featured a wet, closed environment. Australopithecines and early Homo likely preferred cooler conditions than later Homo, as there are no australopithecine sites that were below 1,000 m (3,300 ft) in elevation at the time of deposition. This would mean that, like chimps, they often inhabited areas with an average diurnal temperature of 25 °C (77 °F), dropping to 10 or 5 °C (50 or 41 °F) at night.

In 1983, studying P. robustus remains, South African palaeontologist Charles Kimberlin Brain hypothesised that australopithecine bones accumulated in caves due to large carnivore activity, dragging in carcasses. He was unsure if these predators actively sought them out and brought them back to the cave den to eat, or inhabited deeper recesses of caves and ambushed them when they entered. Baboons in this region modern day often shelter in sinkholes especially on cold winter nights, though Brain proposed that australopithecines seasonally migrated out of the Highveld and into the warmer Bushveld, only taking up cave shelters in spring and autumn. The A. africanus fossils from Sterkfontein Member 4 were likely accumulated by big cats, though hunting hyenas and jackals may have also played a role. Scratches, gouges, and puncture marks on the Taung child similar to those inflicted by modern crowned eagles indicate this individual was killed by a bird of prey.

Around 2.07 million years ago, just before the arrival of P. robustus and H. erectus, A. africanus became extinct in the Cradle of Humankind. It is possible that South Africa was a refuge for Australopithecus until the beginning of major climatic variability and volatility, and, perhaps, competition with Homo and Paranthropus.

== See also ==
- African archaeology
- Australopithecus afarensis – Extinct hominid from the Pliocene of East Africa
- Australopithecus sediba – Extinct hominin from South Africa
- Homo ergaster – Extinct species or subspecies of archaic human
- Homo rudolfensis – Extinct hominin from the Early Pleistocene of East Africa
- Homo habilis – Archaic human species from 2.4 to 1.65 mya
- LD 350-1 – Earliest known specimen of the genus Homo
- Makapansgat pebble – Ancient stone found in South Africa
- Paranthropus robustus – Extinct species of hominin of South Africa
