= Sterkfontein =

Archaeological site in Gauteng, South Africa

Sterkfontein, Cradle of Humankind
- Location within Gauteng
- Location: Gauteng, South Africa
- Coordinates: 26°00′57″S 27°44′05″E
- Established: Declared a World Heritage Site in 2000
- Governing body: Cradle of Humankind

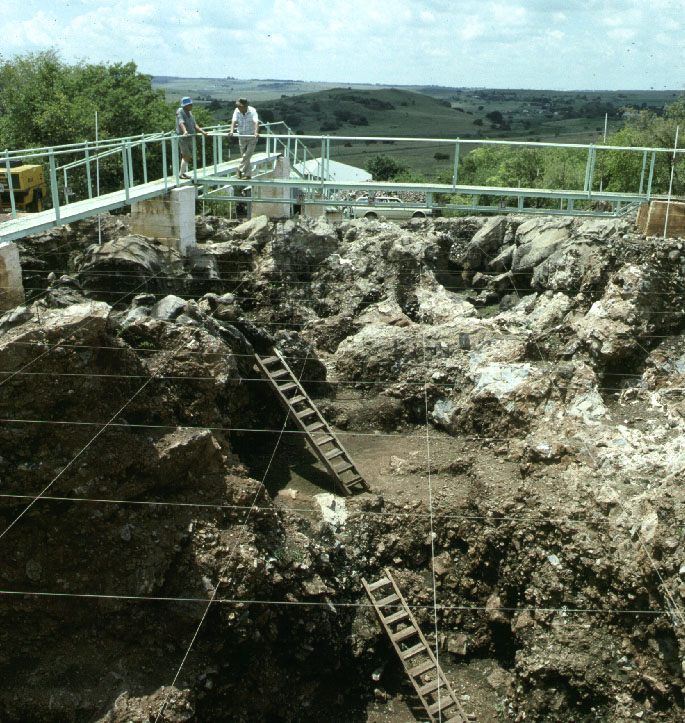
Archaeologists in a structure above the entrance to Sterkfontein

Sterkfontein (Afrikaans for Strong Spring) is a set of limestone caves of special interest in paleoanthropology located in Gauteng province, about 40 kilometres (25 mi) northwest of Johannesburg, South Africa, in the Muldersdrift area close to the town of Krugersdorp. The archaeological sites of Swartkrans and Kromdraai are in the same area. Sterkfontein is a South African National Heritage Site and was also declared a World Heritage Site in 2000. The area in which it is situated is known as the Cradle of Humankind. The Sterkfontein Caves are also home to numerous wild African species including Belonogaster petiolata, a wasp species of which there is a large nesting presence.

Numerous early hominin remains have been found at the site over the last few decades. These have been attributed to Australopithecus, early Homo and Paranthropus.

In 2024 the cave was closed to visitors by its owner due to flooding. The caves reopened to the public on 15 April 2025.

== History of investigations ==
The interior of the caves

Modern excavation of the caves began in the late 1890s by limestone miners who noticed the fossils and brought them to the attention of scientists.

In 1936, students of Professor Raymond Dart and Dr. Robert Broom from the University of the Witwatersrand began concerted excavations. The caves yielded the first adult Australopithecine, substantially strengthening Dart's claim that the skull known as the Taung Child (an Australopithecus africanus) was a human ancestor. There was a pause in excavation during World War II, but after the war Dr. Robert Broom continued excavations. In 1947, he found a nearly complete skull of an adult female (STS 5) A. africanus (or possibly that of an adolescent male). Broom initially named the skull Plesianthropus transvaalensis (near-man from Transvaal), but it became better known by its nickname, Mrs. Ples. Mrs. Ples is now defined as a member of A. africanus.

In 1984, Peter Verhulsel, who was a member of a cave diving expedition researching one of the caves, was lost and ultimately starved to death after three weeks in the cave as rescue groups could not find him.

In 1997, a nearly complete skeleton of a second species of Australopithecus (StW 573) was found in the caves by Ronald J. Clarke; extraction of the remains from the surrounding breccia is ongoing. The skeleton was named Little Foot, since the first parts found (in 1995, in storage) were the bones of a foot. Excavations continue to this day, and finds now total some 500 hominids, making Sterkfontein one of the richest sites in the world for early hominids. The Palaeo-Anthropology Scientific Trust (PAST), a non-profit trust fund established in 1993, sponsors over 90% of the research undertaken at Sterkfontein and was instrumental in its nomination as a World Heritage Site.

== Dating of the deposits ==
The Member 4 deposits containing the Australopithecus africanus fossils have been dated to between 2.6 and 2.0 Ma, with the Sts5 "Mrs. Ples" fossil estimated to date to between 2.05 and 2.01 Ma based on a combination of Uranium–lead dating and palaeomagnetic analysis and electron spin resonance dating The StW 573 partial skeleton (Little Foot) was recovered from a separate infill at the site within the confines of the Silberberg Grotto. It is estimated to be around 2.6–2.2 Ma based on a combination of uranium-lead dating and palaeomagnetic analysis and belongs to a second species of australopith, Australopithecus prometheus. In contrast, surface exposure dating of sediments indicate that skeleton StW 573 has an age of approximately 4 million years. While the flowstone dated in the uranium-lead dating has been shown to have formed later than the fossil, an age estimate of ~3 Ma suggested by the same authors has little firm basis. The palaeomagnetic analysis remains the most credible age estimate based on the current data as it included work on both sediments and speleothem.

The tiny white shrimp that inhabit the clear water of the Sterkfontein Caves

A slightly younger deposit (StW 53 infill) dated to between 1.8 to 1.5 Mya has revealed the remains of a specimen of early Homo (StW 53). StW 53 has been described as similar to Homo habilis or as a novel new species Homo gautengensis. No stone tools were associated with the fossil, but StW 53 has evidence for stone tool cut-marks. Member 5 contains Oldowan and Acheulian stone tools as well as specimens of early Homo and Paranthropus and is dated to between 1.6 and 1.1 Mya.

In 2022 cosmogenic nuclide dating found that the bulk of Member 4 is 3.4 million years old." The team responsible for this work, which includes Clarke, says: "These results place nearly the entire Australopithecus assemblage at Sterkfontein in the mid-Pliocene, contemporaneous with Australopithecus afarensis in East Africa." They say this discredits the assumption that A. africanus descended from A. afarensis.

== Gallery ==
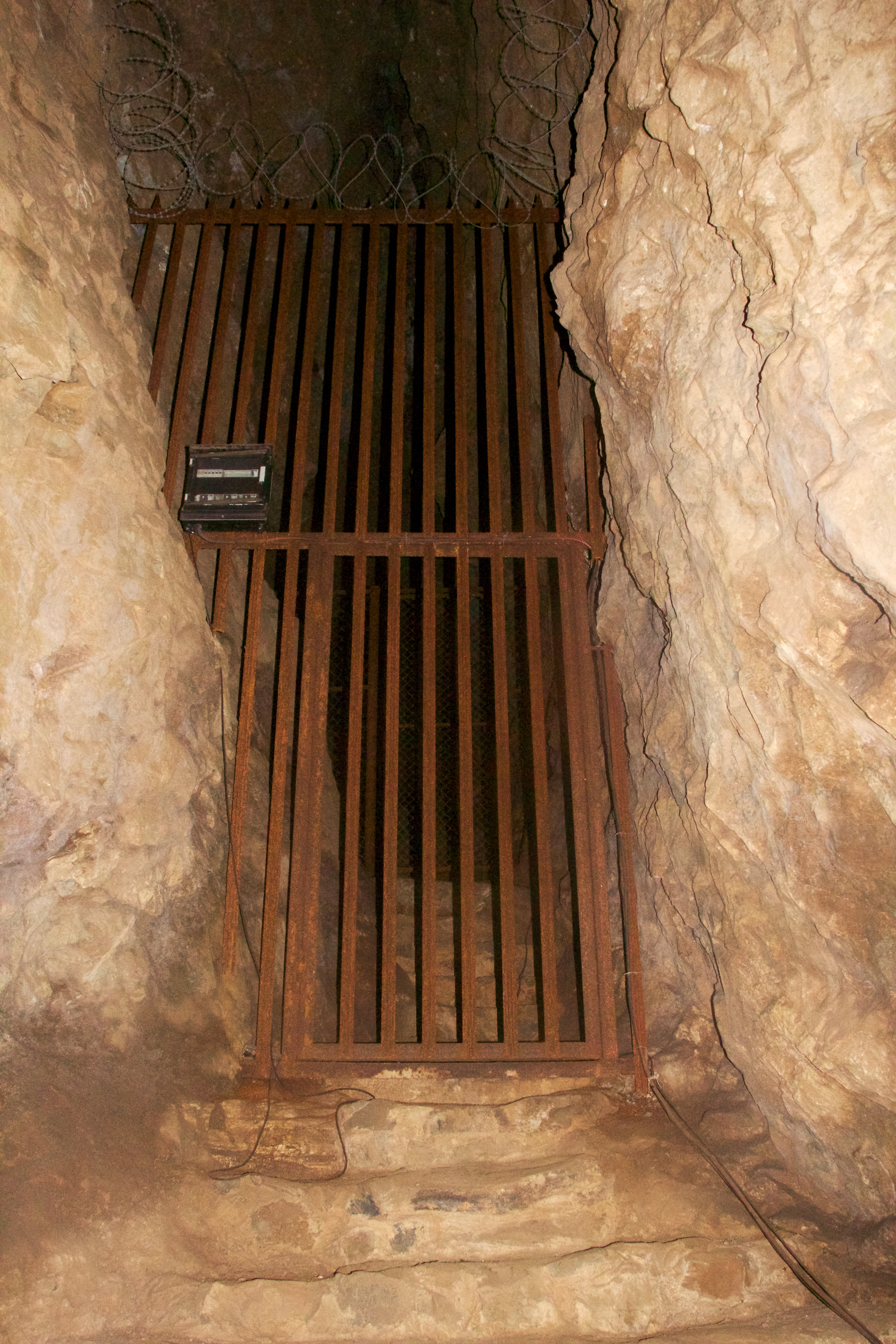
Entrance to the Silberberg Grotto containing Little Foot

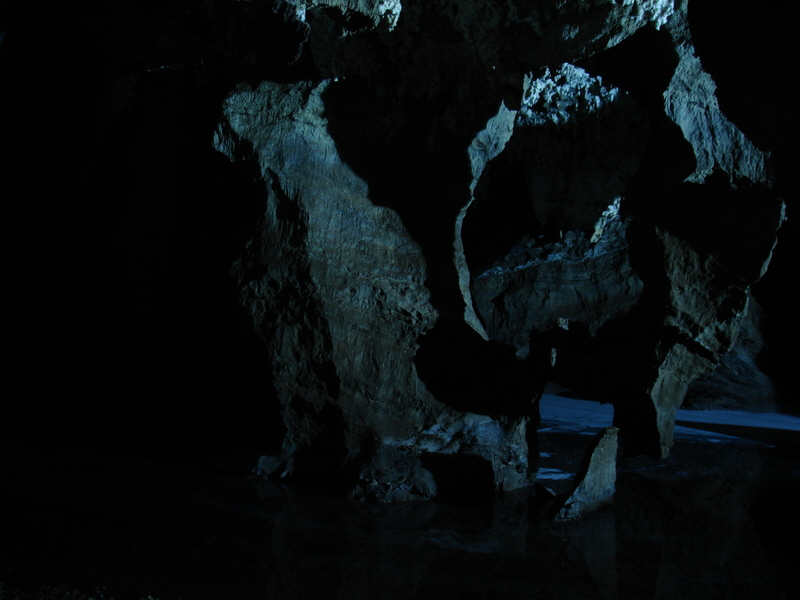
The underground lake in the Sterkfontein Caves. One diver has died in the lake

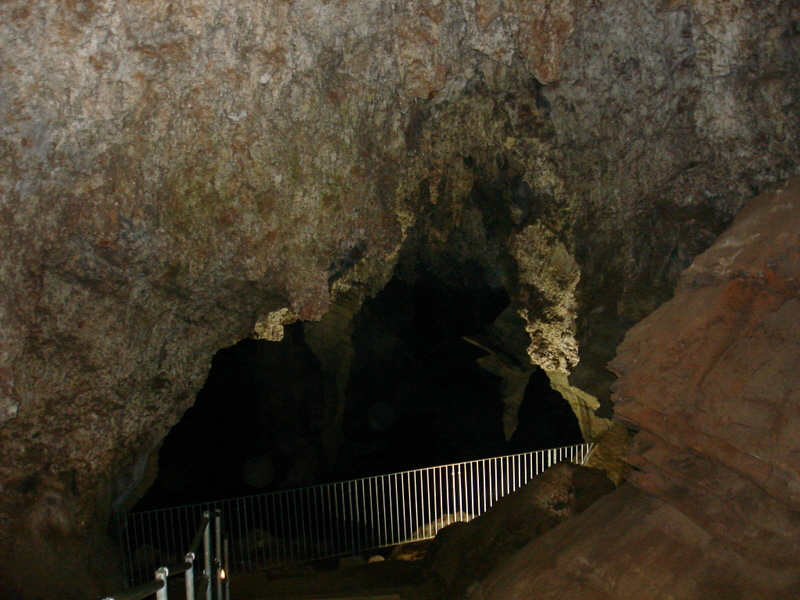
A view down toward the lake in the caves

The exit to the Sterkfontein Caves

== See also ==
- Cradle of Humankind
- List of caves in South Africa
- Muldersdrift
