= Robert Broom =

South African doctor and palaeontologist (1866–1951)

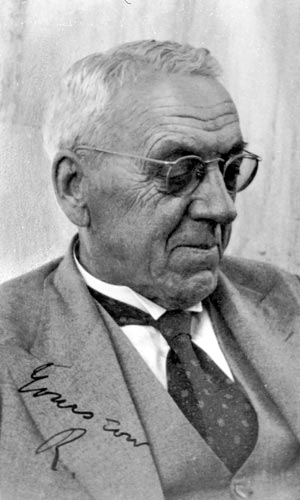
- Born: 30 November 1866; Paisley, Renfrewshire, Scotland
- Died: 6 April 1951 (aged 84); Pretoria, South Africa
- Education: University of Glasgow
- Known for: Identification of hominim fossils, The mammal-like reptiles of South Africa and the origin of mammals, The coming of man: was it accident or design? and other books
- Spouse: Mary Baird Baillie
- Parents: John Broom (father); Agnes Hunter Shearer (mother)
- Awards: Royal Medal (1928); Daniel Giraud Elliot Medal (1946); Wollaston Medal (1949)
- Scientific career
- Institutions: University of Stellenbosch, South African Museum, Cape Town
- Patrons: Jan Smuts
- Author abbrev. (zoology): Broom

Signature
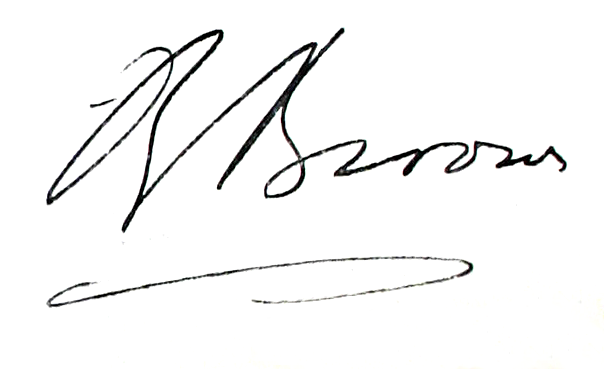

Robert Broom FRS FRSE (30 November 1866 – 6 April 1951) was a British-South African medical doctor and palaeontologist. He qualified as a medical practitioner in 1895 and received his DSc in 1905 from the University of Glasgow.

From 1903 to 1910, he was professor of zoology and geology at Victoria College, Stellenbosch, South Africa, and subsequently he became keeper of vertebrate palaeontology at the South African Museum, Cape Town.

== Life ==
Broom was born at 66 Back Sneddon Street in Paisley, Renfrewshire, Scotland, the son of John Broom, a designer of calico prints and Paisley shawls, and Agnes Hunter Shearer.

In 1893, he married Mary Baird Baillie, his childhood sweetheart.

In his medical studies at the University of Glasgow Broom specialised in obstetrics. After graduating in 1895 he travelled to Australia, supporting himself by practising medicine. He settled in South Africa in 1897, just prior to the South African War. From 1903 to 1910, he was professor of Zoology and Geology at Victoria College, Stellenbosch (later Stellenbosch University), but was forced out of this position for promoting belief in evolution. He established a medical practice in the Karoo region of South Africa, an area rich in therapsid fossils. Based on his continuing studies of these fossils and mammalian anatomy he was made a Fellow of the Royal Society in 1920. Following the discovery of the Taung child he became interested in the search for human ancestors and commenced work on much more recent fossils from the dolomite caves north-west of Johannesburg, particularly Sterkfontein Cave (now part of the Cradle of Humankind World Heritage Site). As well as describing many mammalian fossils from these caves he identified several hominin fossils, the most complete of which was an australopithecine skull, nicknamed Mrs Ples, and a partial skeleton that indicated that australopithecines walked upright.

Broom died in Pretoria, South Africa in 1951.

== Contributions ==
Broom was first known for his study of therapsids, particularly non-mammalian cynodonts. After Raymond Dart's discovery of the Taung Child, an infant australopithecine, Broom's interest in palaeoanthropology was heightened. Broom's career seemed over and he was sinking into poverty, when Dart wrote to Jan Smuts about the situation. Smuts, exerting pressure on the South African government, managed to obtain a position for Broom in 1934 with the staff of the Transvaal Museum in Pretoria as an Assistant in Palaeontology.

Broom has been described as "one of the great Karoo (and, in particular, therapsid) palaeontologists", having managed to describe 369 therapsid holotypes in his lifetime, which he ascribed to 168 new genera. Broom has a reputation as a "splitter" that has resulted in only around 57% of his holotypes still being considered valid as of 2003.

In the following years, he and John T. Robinson made a series of spectacular finds, including fragments from six hominins in Sterkfontein, which they named Plesianthropus transvaalensis, popularly called Mrs. Ples, but which was later classified as an adult Australopithecus africanus, as well as more discoveries at sites in Kromdraai and Swartkrans. In 1937, Broom made his most famous discovery, by defining the robust hominin genus Paranthropus with his discovery of Paranthropus robustus. These discoveries helped support Dart's claims for the Taung species.

For his volume, The South Africa Fossil Ape-Men, The Australopithecinae, in which he proposed the Australopithecinae subfamily, Broom was awarded the Daniel Giraud Elliot Medal from the National Academy of Sciences in 1946.

The remainder of Broom's career was devoted to the exploration of these sites and the interpretation of the many early hominin remains discovered there. He continued to write to the last. Shortly before his death he finished a monograph on the Australopithecines and remarked to his nephew:

"Now that's finished ... and so am I."

== Spiritual evolution ==
Broom was a nonconformist and was deeply interested in the paranormal and spiritualism; he was a critic of Darwinism and materialism. Broom was a believer in spiritual evolution. In his book The Coming of Man: Was it Accident or Design? (1933) he claimed that "spiritual agencies" had guided evolution as animals and plants were too complex to have arisen by chance. According to Broom, there were at least two different kinds of spiritual forces, and psychics are capable of seeing them. Broom claimed there was a plan and purpose in evolution and that the origin of Homo sapiens is the ultimate purpose behind evolution. According to Broom "Much of evolution looks as if it had been planned to result in man, and in other animals and plants to make the world a suitable place for him to dwell in."

After discovering the skull of Mrs. Ples, Broom was asked if he excavated at random, Broom replied that spirits had told him where to find his discoveries.

== Khoisan and "race science" ==
Broom had a noted interest in the Khoisan peoples, which included collecting their remains, including those of the recently deceased, as well as by digging up old graves. Broom first began collecting modern human remains in 1897, shortly after he moved to South Africa. In that year he collected the remains of three elderly "Hottentot" people that had died around Port Nolloth following a drought in the region. Broom stated that he "cut their heads off and boiled them in paraffin tins on the kitchen stove". Their skulls were later sent to the medical school of the University of Edinburgh, alongside a 7 month old foetus, from which Broom had removed the brain which he preserved separately. Broom also obtained remains of deceased prisoners, stating: "If a prisoner dies and you want his skeleton, probably two or three regulations stand in the way, but the enthusiast does not worry about such regulations." Broom said that he had buried several corpses in his garden allowing them to decay before later retrieving their bones. These include the remains of two men who were imprisoned in Douglas jail: Andreas Links, an 18 year old !Ora man, (catalogued as MMK 264), as well an unnamed 18 year old "bushman" from Langeberg (catalogued as MMK 283), who was photographed while alive at the request of Broom, despite this being against policy. The skeletons of both men were added to the collections of the McGregor Museum in 1921.

Broom described the Khoisan peoples as a "degenerate" and "degraded race", speculating in 1907 that they descended from "the race which built the Pyramids" and "Mongoloids", but had "degenerated" due to South Africa's hot climate. In his later works he divided the Khoisan peoples into three races, the Bushmen, Hottentot and Korana, based on supposed typological differences, with the type specimen of the Korana race being the skeleton of Links. Other contemporary anthropologists questioned this classification scheme, especially the Korana race. Broom later said that he had "invented the Korana". All such typological racial classification schemes are discredited today, due to being based on vague criteria, resulting in the rigid categorization ultimately being arbitrary. Anatomist Goran Štrkalj wrote that: "It is obvious that Broom's anthropological work was ... influenced by the racist stereotypes and prejudices of the day".

== Publications ==
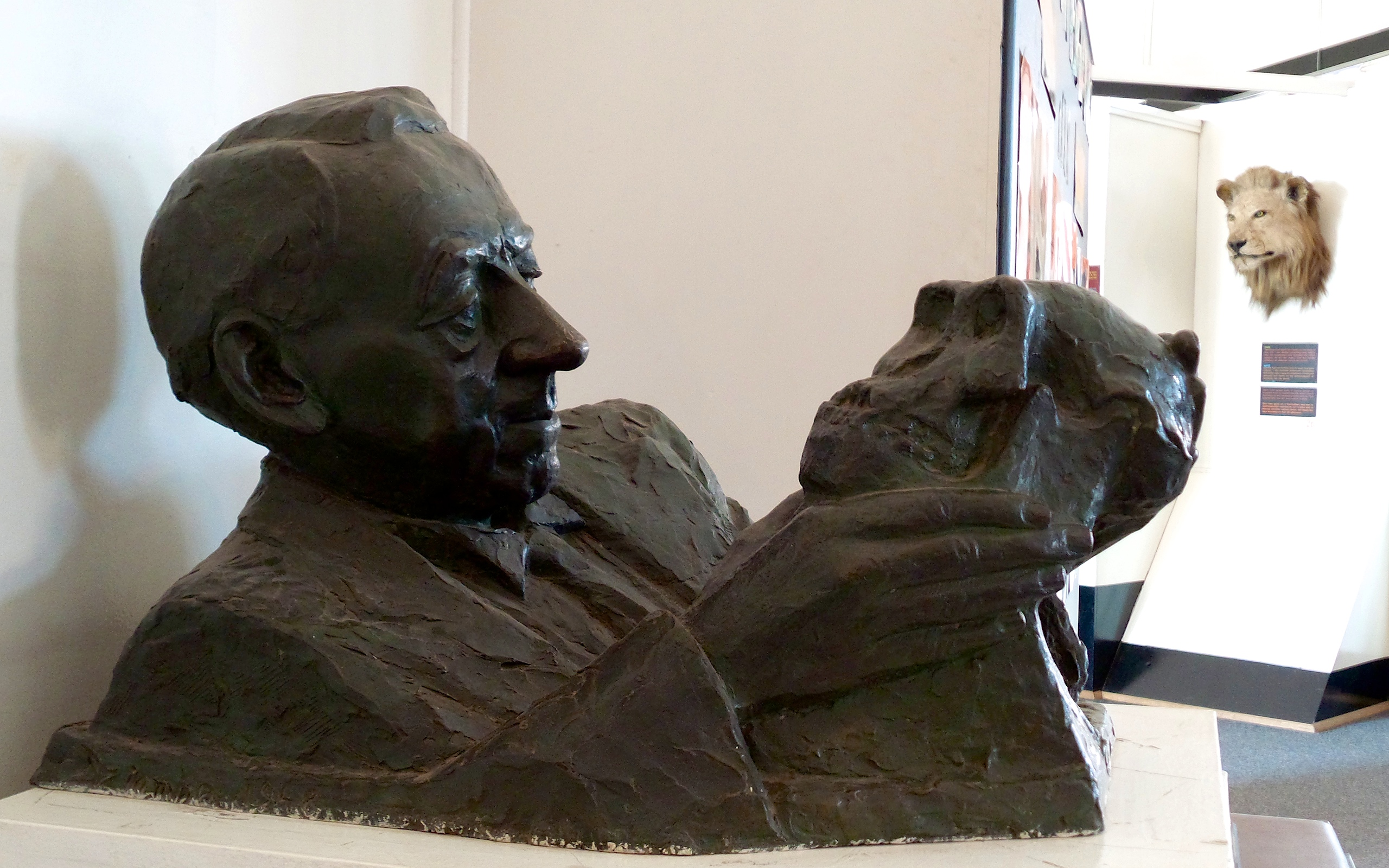
Bust of Robert Broom and Mrs. Ples

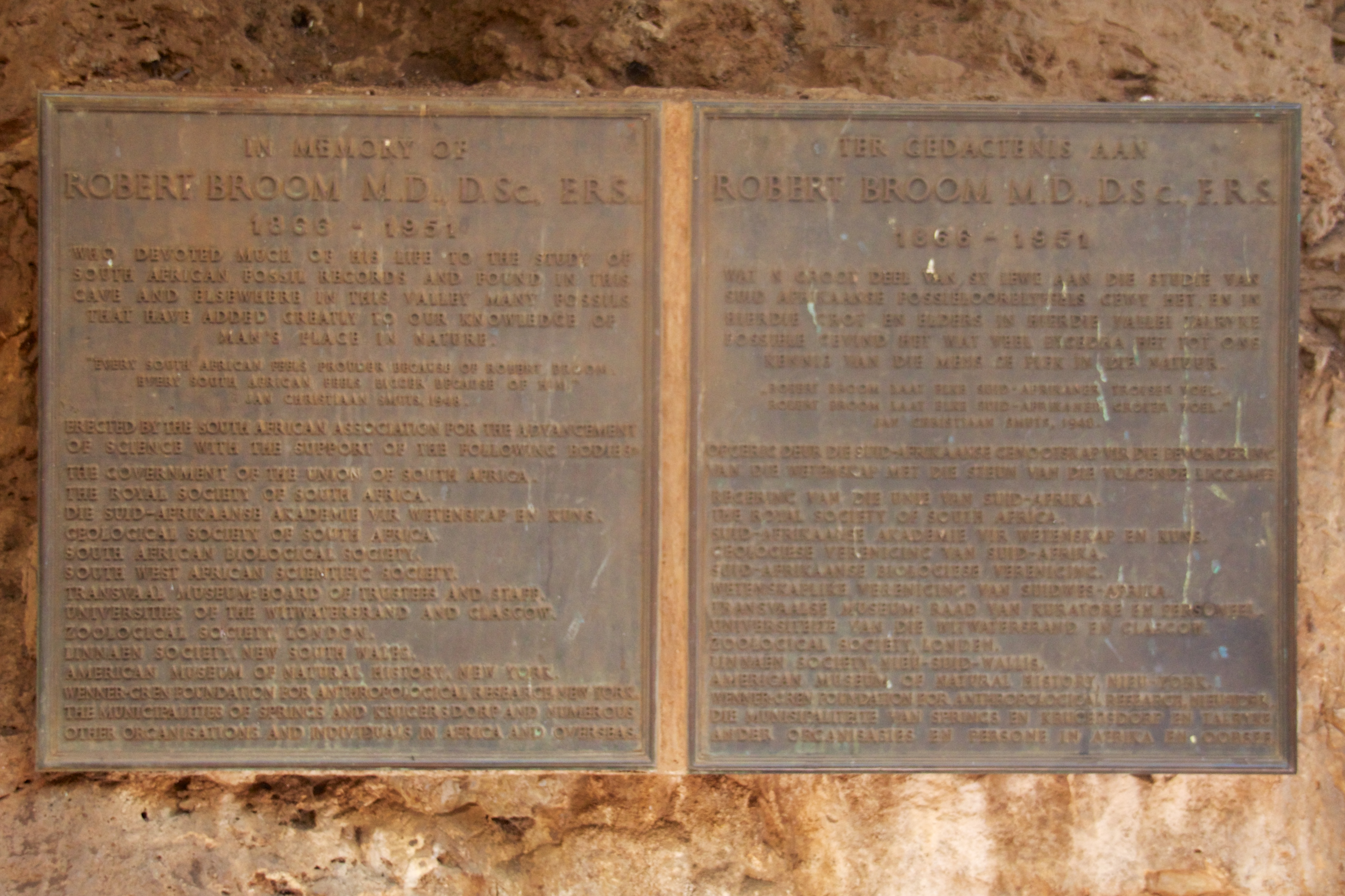
Memorial plaque at the Sterkfontein caves

Among hundreds of articles contributed by him to scientific journals, the most important include:

- "Fossil Reptiles of South Africa" in Science in South Africa (1905)
- "Reptiles of Karroo Formation" in Geology of Cape Colony (1909)
- "Development and Morphology of the Marsupial Shoulder Girdle" in Transactions of the Royal Society of Edinburgh (1899)
- "Comparison of Permian Reptiles of North America with Those of South Africa" in Bulletin of the American Museum of Natural History (1910)
- "Structure of Skull in Cynodont Reptiles" in Proceedings of the Zoölogical Society (1911).
- The South Africa Fossil Ape-Men, The Australopithecinae (1946).

Books

- The origin of the human skeleton: an introduction to human osteology (1930)
- The mammal-like reptiles of South Africa and the origin of mammals (1932)
- The coming of man: was it accident or design? (1933)
- The South African fossil ape-man: the Australopithecinae (1946)
- Sterkfontein ape-man Plesianthropus (1949)
- Finding the missing link (1950)

== Legacy ==
Robert Broom is commemorated in the scientific name of a species of Australian blind snake, Anilios broomi, the Triassic archosauromorph reptile Prolacerta broomi, the rhinesuchid amphibian Broomistega, the Permian dicynodont Robertia broomiana and millerettid Broomia and the aloe plant species Aloe broomii.

== See also ==
- List of fossil sites (with link directory)
- List of hominina fossils (with images)
- Bernard Price Institute for Palaeontological Research
- John Talbot Robinson, co-discoverer of Mrs Ples.
- PanAfrican Archaeological Association
