= Hannah Morris =

American anthropologist

- Education: University of Georgia; Ohio State University
- Known for: Discovery of Homo naledi
- Scientific career
- Fields: Anthropology; Paleoethnobotany
- Institutions: University of Georgia
- Doctoral advisor: Elizabeth King

Hannah Morris is an American anthropologist, known for her contribution to the Rising Star Expedition as one of the six women Underground Astronauts. She is currently a Ph.D. student in the Warnell School of Forestry and Natural Resources at the University of Georgia, studying "the implications of human actions on vegetative ecosystems".

== Education ==
Morris attended the University of Georgia, earning a B.A. in anthropology in 2007. She participated in archaeological projects in the United States and Mexico, before returning to her studies at Ohio State University, earning an M.A. in anthropology in 2012 with a special focus in paleoethnobotany.

== Rising Star Expedition ==
In October 2013, Morris, Becca Peixotto, Marina Elliot, Alia Gurtov, K. Lindsay Eaves, and Elen Feuerriegel were chosen to be part of a specialized excavation team for the Rising Star Expedition. The purpose of the twenty-one day expedition, sponsored by The National Geographic Society and the University of the Witwatersrand, Johannesburg was to excavate fossils which had been recently found in a deep cave complex in the Rising Star Cave System, near Johannesburg, South Africa.

The unique skill set sought for the excavation team by lead scientist and University of the Witwatersrand professor Lee Berger were: a "master's degree or higher in palaeontology, archeology or an associated field; caving experience; and the ability to fit through an 18-centimeter (about 7-inch) space. The six scientists were crucial in the successful" excavation of arguably one of the most important fossil finds in human history – a new species referred to as Homo naledi.

The six member team, with a support of a team of over sixty scientists, excavated "one of the richest collections of hominin fossils ever discovered—some 1,550 fossil fragments, belonging to at least 15 individual skeletons".

== See also ==
- Dawn of Humanity
