= Cradle of Humankind =

Paleoanthropological site near Johannesburg, South Africa

Fossil Hominid Sites of South Africa
UNESCO World Heritage Site
- Interactive map of Fossil Hominid Sites of South Africa
- Location: South Africa
- Criteria: Cultural: iii, vi
- Reference: 915
- Inscription: 1999 (23rd Session)
- Extensions: 2015

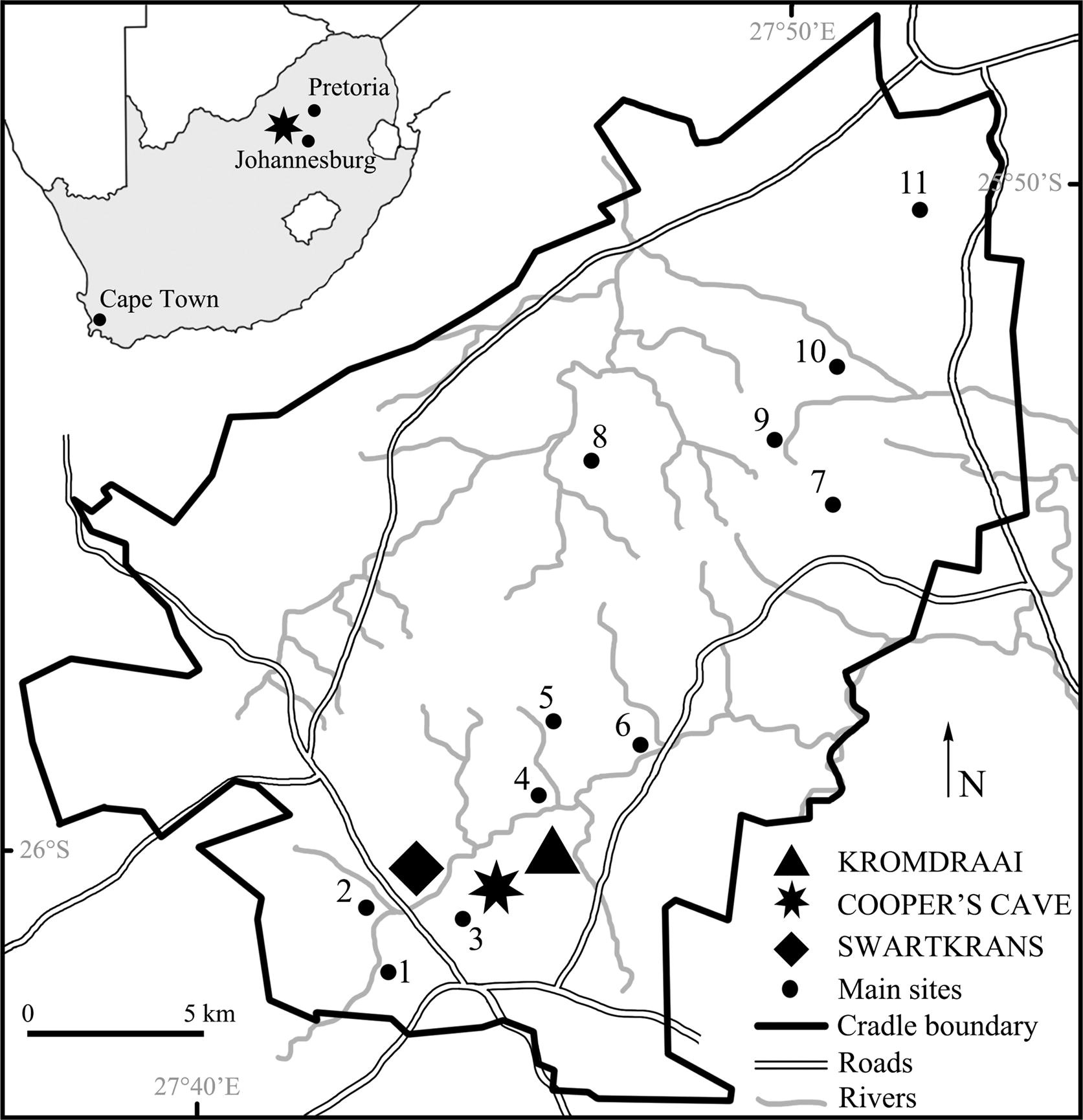
Map of the Cradle of Humankind area, 2024

The Cradle of Humankind is a paleoanthropological site that is located about 50 km (31 mi) northwest of Johannesburg, South Africa, in the Gauteng province. Declared a World Heritage Site by UNESCO in 1999, the site is home to the largest known concentration of human ancestral remains anywhere in the world. The site currently occupies 47,000 hectares (120,000 acres) and contains a complex system of limestone caves. The registered name of the site in the list of World Heritage Sites is Fossil Hominid Sites of South Africa.

According to the South African Journal of Science, Bolt's Farm is the place where the earliest primates were discovered. Bolt's Farm was heavily mined for speleothem (calcium carbonate from stalagmites, stalactites, and flowstones) in the terminal nineteenth and early twentieth centuries.

The Sterkfontein Caves were the site of the discovery of a 2.3-million-year-old fossil Australopithecus africanus (nicknamed "Mrs. Ples"), found in 1947 by Robert Broom and John T. Robinson. The find helped corroborate the 1924 discovery by Raymond Dart of the juvenile Australopithecus africanus skull known as the "Taung Child" at Taung in the North West Province of South Africa, where excavations still continue.

Nearby, but not in the site, the Rising Star Cave system contains the Dinaledi Chamber (chamber of stars), in which were discovered fifteen fossil skeletons of an extinct species of hominin, provisionally named Homo naledi.

Sterkfontein alone has produced more than a third of early hominid fossils found prior to 2010. The Dinaledi Chamber contains more than 1,500 H. naledi bone specimens from at least 15 individuals, the most extensive discovery of a single hominid species ever found in Africa.

== Etymology ==
The name Cradle of Humankind reflects the fact that the site has produced a substantially large number of hominin fossils, some of the oldest yet found, dating as far back as 3.5 million years ago.

== History of discoveries ==
Hominin timeline
← / Earlier apes; ← / Gorilla split; ← / Chimpanzee split; ← / Earliest bipedal; ← / Earliest sign of Ardipithecus; ← / Earliest sign of Australopithecus; ← / Earliest stone tools; ← / Earliest sign of Homo; ← / Dispersal beyond Africa; ← / Earliest fire / cooking; ← / Earliest rock art; ← / Earliest clothes; ← / Modern humans
(million years ago)

In 1935, Robert Broom found the first human fossils at Sterkfontein and began work at this site. In 1938, a young schoolboy, Gert Terrblanche, brought Raymond Dart fragments of a skull from nearby Kromdraai that later were identified as Paranthropus robustus. Also in 1938, a single human tooth was found at the Cooper's Cave site between Kromdraai and Sterkfontein.

In 1948, the Camp-Peabody Expedition from the United States worked at Bolts Farm and Gladysvale looking for fossil hominids, but failed to find any. Later in 1948, Robert Broom identified the first hominid remains from Swartkrans cave.

In 1954, C. K. Brain began working at sites in the Cradle, including Cooper's Cave. He then initiated his three-decade work at Swartkrans cave, which resulted in the recovery of the second-largest sample of hominid remains from the Cradle. The oldest controlled use of fire by Homo erectus also was discovered at Swartkrans and dated to more than 1 million years ago.

In 1966, Phillip Tobias began his excavations of Sterkfontein that are still continuing and are the longest continuously running fossil excavations in the world.

In 1991, Lee Berger of the University of the Witwatersrand discovered the first hominid specimens from the Gladysvale site, making it the first new early hominid site to be discovered in South Africa in 48 years. In 1994, Andre Keyser discovered fossil hominids at the site of Drimolen. In 1997, Kevin Kuykendall and Colin Menter of the University of the Witwatersrand found two fossil hominid teeth at the site of Gondolin. Also in 1997, the near-complete Australopithecus skeleton of "Little Foot", then dated to approximately 3.3 million years ago (more recent dating suggests it is closer to 2.5 million years ago), was discovered by Ron Clarke.

In 2001, Steve Churchill of Duke University and Lee Berger found early modern human remains at Plovers Lake. Also in 2001, the first hominid fossils and stone tools were discovered in-situ at Cooper's Cave. In 2008, Lee Berger discovered the partial remains of two hominids (Australopithecus sediba) who lived between 1.78 and 1.95 million years ago in the Malapa Fossil Site.

In October 2013, Berger commissioned geologist Pedro Boshoff to investigate cave systems in the Cradle of Humankind for the express purpose of discovering more fossil hominin sites. Cavers Rick Hunter and Steven Tucker discovered hominid fossils in a previously unexplored area of the Rising Star-Westminster Cave System that is assigned site designation UW-101. In November 2013, Berger led a joint expedition of the University of the Witwatersrand and National Geographic Society to the Rising Star Cave System near Swartkrans. In just three weeks of excavation, the six-woman international team of advance speleological scientists (K. Lindsay Eaves, Marina Elliott, Elen Feuerriegel, Alia Gurtov, Hannah Morris, and Becca Peixotto), chosen for their paleoanthropological and caving skills, as well as their small size, recovered more than 1,200 fossil specimens of an unidentified hominin species. As of 2015, the site remained in the process of being dated. In September 2015, Berger, in collaboration with National Geographic, announced the discovery of a new species of human relative, named Homo naledi, from UW-101. Some researchers suggest that H. naledi intentionally deposited bodies of its dead in a remote cave chamber, a behaviour previously thought limited to later Homo species, though this is a subject of ongoing scholarly debate. In the last days of the Rising Star Expedition, cavers Rick Hunter and Steven Tucker discovered additional fossil hominid material in another portion of the cave system. Preliminary excavations at this site, designated UW-102, had begun by 2013 and yielded complete hominid fossil material of its own. The relationship of site 101 to 102 is not known.

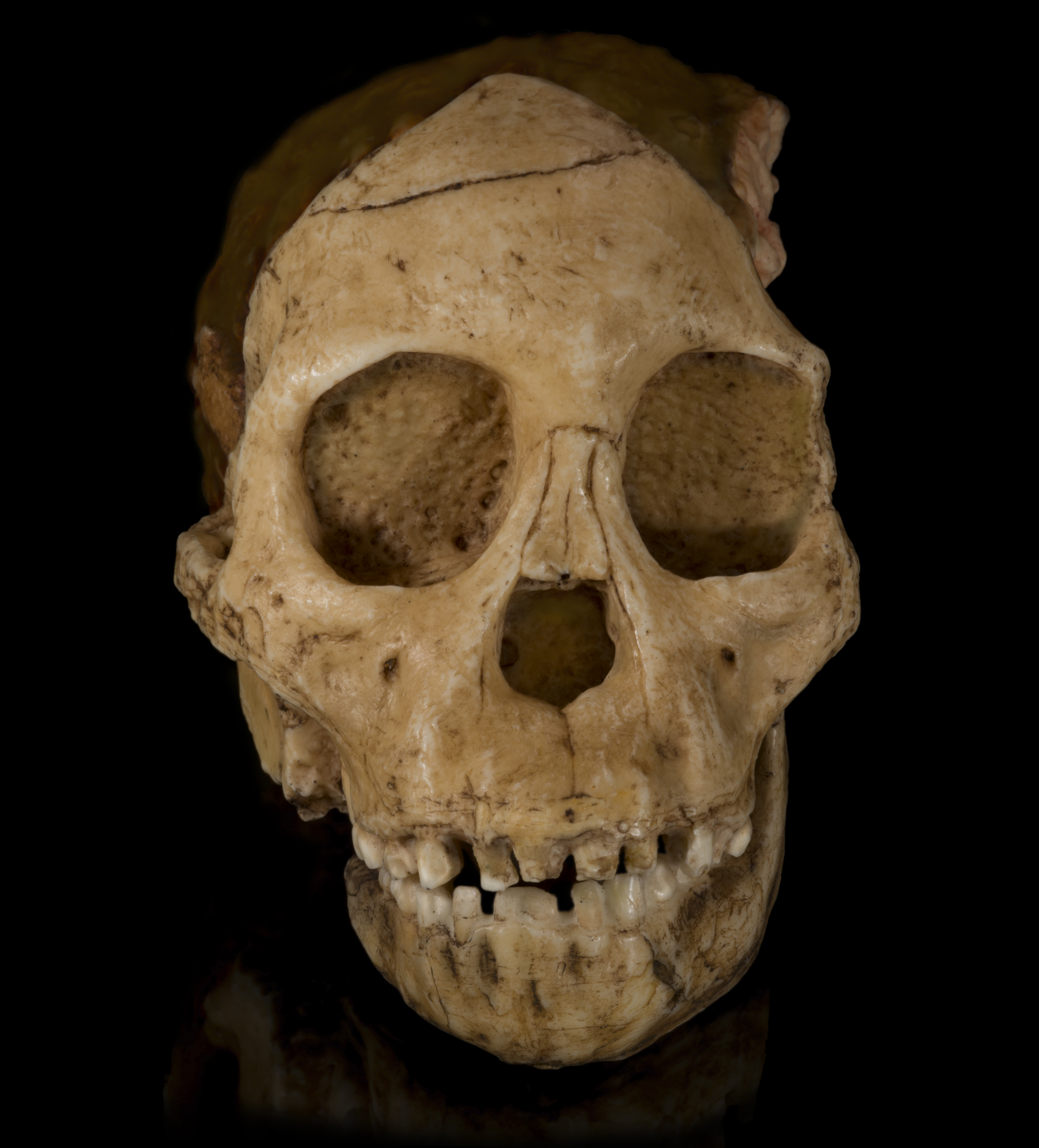
Australopithecus africanus (reconstruction)

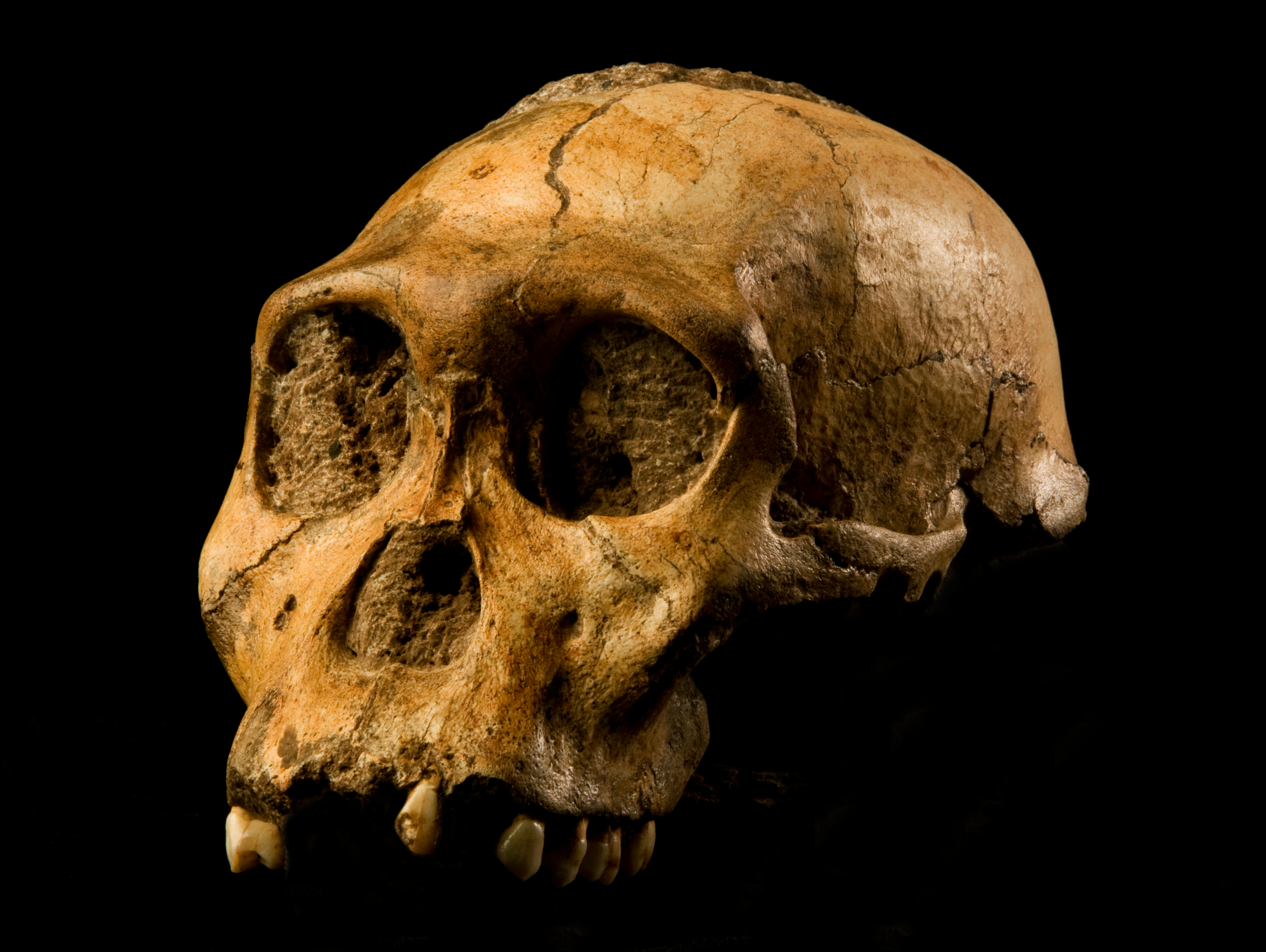
This skull is part of the holotype for Australopithecus sediba

== Geological context ==
The hominin remains that fossilised over time at the Cradle of Humankind are found in dolomitic caves, and are often encased in a mixture of limestone and other sediments called breccia. Early hominids may have lived throughout Africa, but their remains are found only at sites where conditions allowed for the formation and preservation of fossils.

== Visitor centres ==
On 7 December 2005, South African President Thabo Mbeki opened the new Maropeng Visitors Centre at the site. Per the maropeng.co.za website, visitors may see fossils, view stone tools, and learn about the birth of humankind in the visitors centre. The visitors centre also offers a tour of the Sterkfontein Caves and the exhibition at Sterkfontein. A light, moveable, steel structure known as the Beetle has been placed over the Malapa site, to allow the paying public to view excavations, once they resume at the site. (Digging has been on hold since 2009, when the remains of four A. sediba individuals were removed.)

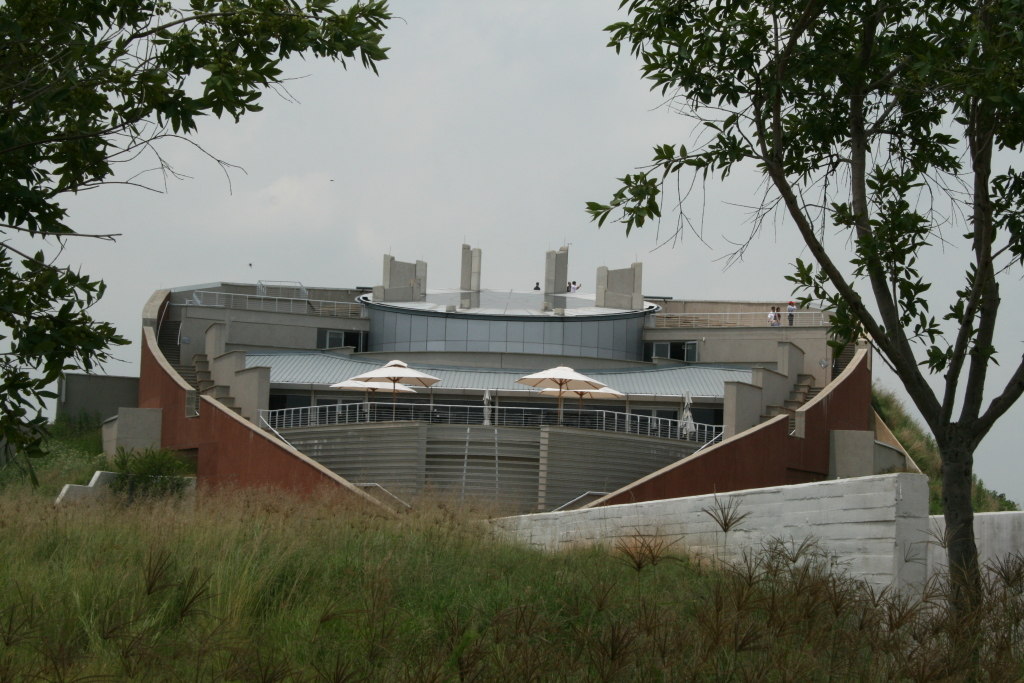
Tumulus building at Maropeng visitors centre

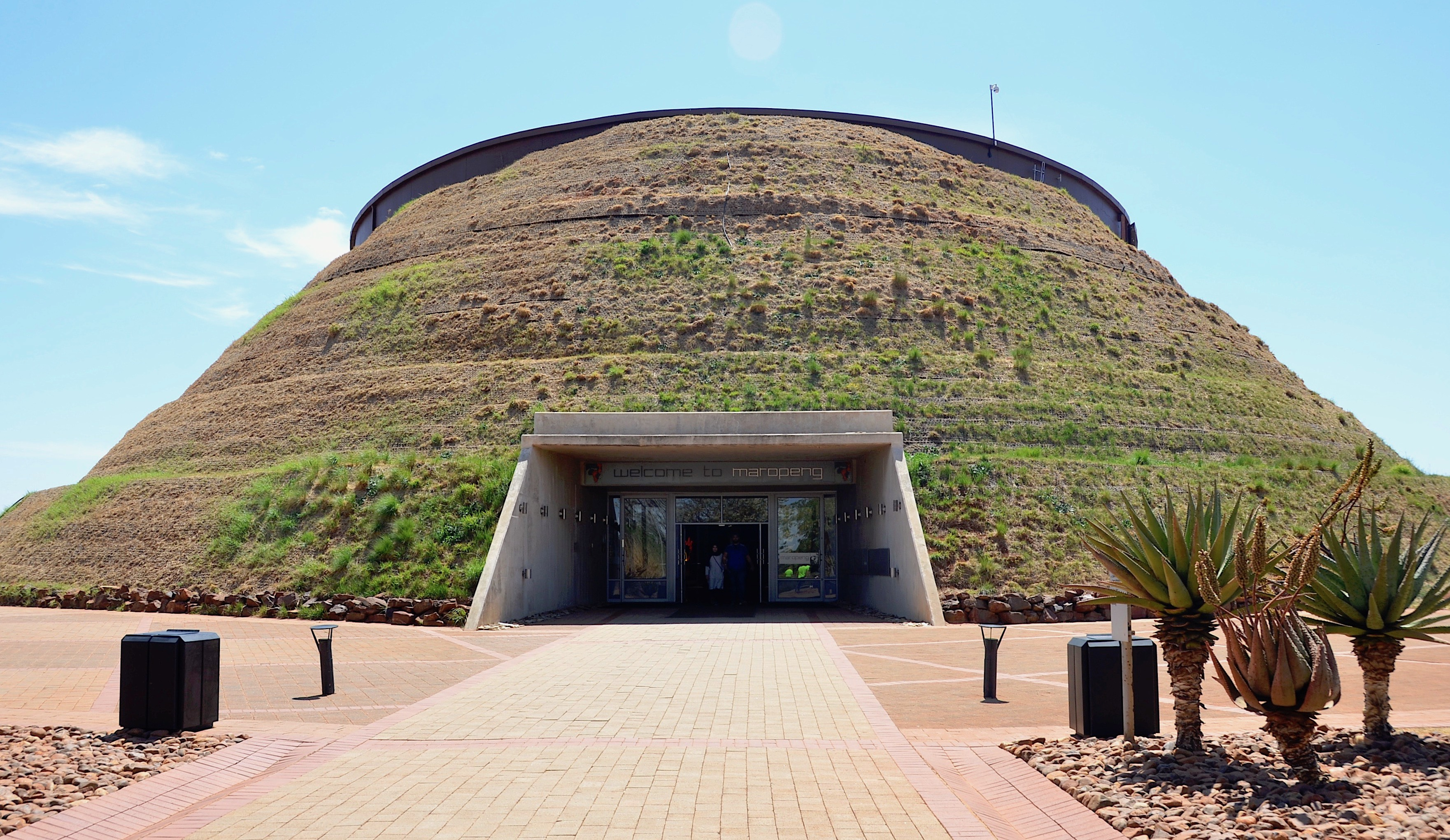
Front of Maropeng

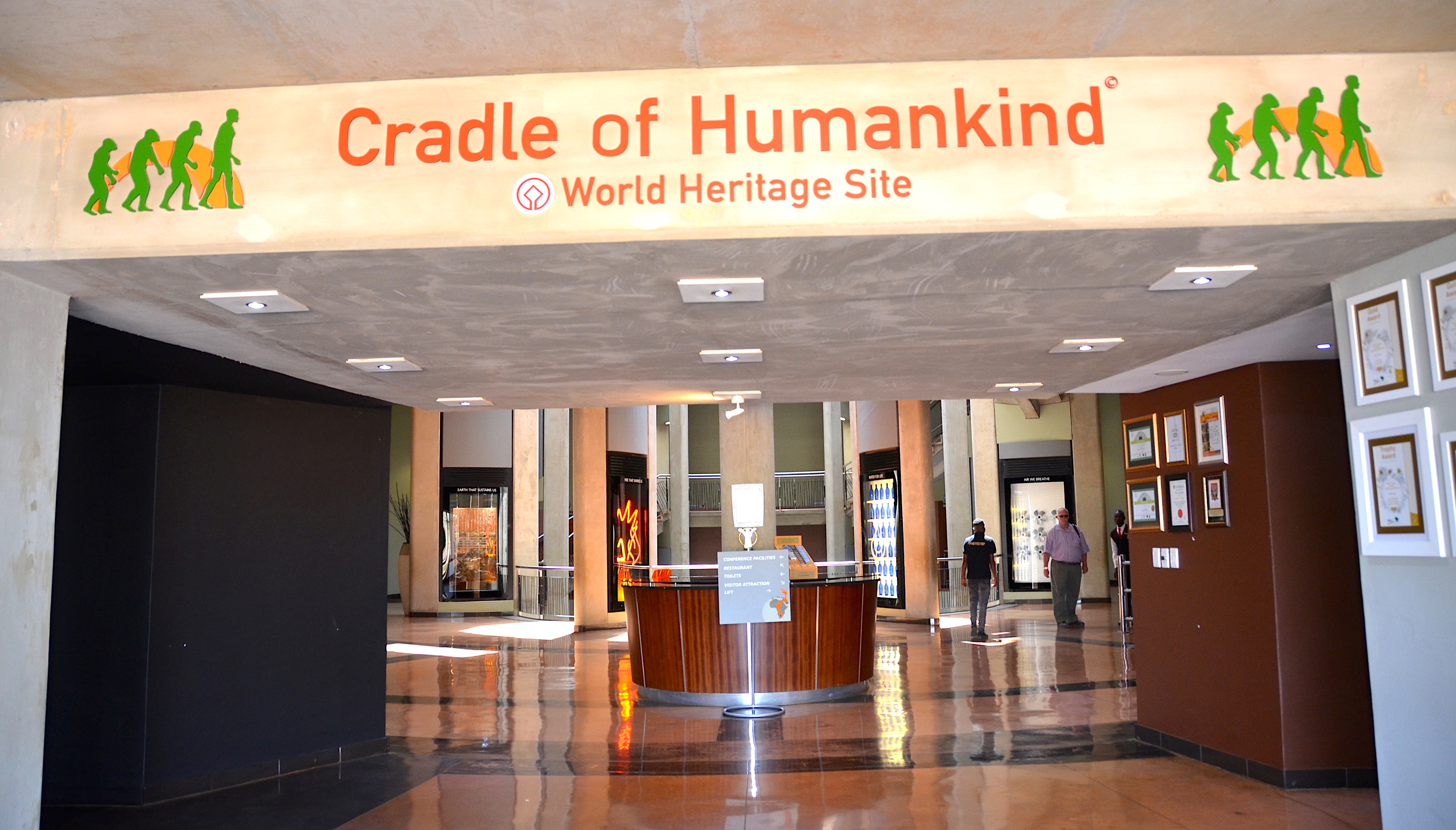
Maropeng Visitor Centre

== See also ==
- Cradle of civilization
- Dawn of Humanity, a 2015 PBS film
- Maropeng Cavemen, South Africa field hockey club
- Muldersdrift
- Recent African origin of modern humans
- Wonder Cave
