= Becca Peixotto =

American archaeologist

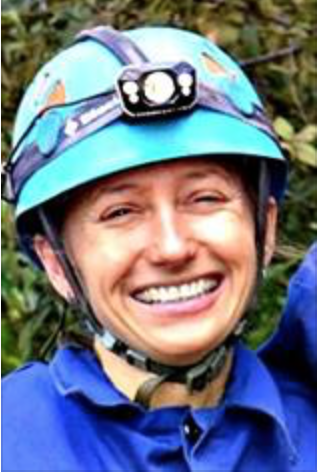
- Education: University of Alabama in Huntsville (B.A.); University of Amsterdam (M.A.); American University (Ph.D.)
- Known for: Discovery of Homo naledi
- Scientific career
- Fields: Anthropology; Archaeology
- Institutions: American University
- Thesis: Against the Map: Resistance Landscapes of the Great Dismal Swamp
- Doctoral advisor: Dr. Daniel O. Sayers

Rebecca (Becca) Peixotto is an American archaeologist who is best known for her contribution to the Rising Star Expedition as one of the six Underground Astronauts, a group of scientists tasked with excavating the Rising Star Cave System. She has also participated in the Great Dismal Swamp Landscape Study and is an experienced wilderness educator.

== Education ==
Peixotto received her Ph.D. in Anthropology, Archaeology Specialization, in 2017 from American University with her dissertation Against the Map: Resistance Landscapes of the Great Dismal Swamp. Peixotto obtained a B.A. in Slavic Area Studies and Mathematics from the University of Alabama in Huntsville. She pursued further studies abroad at the University of Amsterdam, obtaining an M.A. in Discourse and Argumentation Studies. She returned to the U.S. to attend the American University in Washington, DC, where she earned a M.A. in Public Anthropology, Archaeology Specialization, in 2013.

== Rising Star Expedition ==
In October 2013, Peixotto and five others were chosen to be part of a specialized excavation team for the Rising Star Expedition. The purpose of the 21-day expedition, sponsored by The National Geographic Society and the University of the Witwatersrand, Johannesburg, was to excavate fossils which had been recently found in a deep cave complex in the Rising Star Cave System, near Johannesburg, South Africa.

The critical skills and physical attributes sought for the excavation team by lead scientist and University of the Witwatersrand professor Lee Berger were a "master's degree or higher in palaeontology, archeology or an associated field; caving experience; and the ability to fit through an 18-centimeter (about 7-inch) space." The six women scientists were crucial in the successful "excavation of arguably one of the most important fossil finds in human history – a new species referred to as Homo naledi."

Peixotto, Hannah Morris, Marina Elliott, Alia Gurtov, K. Lindsay Eaves, and Elen Feuerriegel, along with a team of sixty international scientists, excavated "one of the richest collections of hominin fossils ever discovered—some 1,550 fossil fragments, belonging to at least 15 individual skeletons."

Since this expedition, Peixotto has continued to work with a team to learn more about Homo naledi. As of 2021, this team has discovered two dozen naledi individuals and evidence that suggests this cave system might have served as burial grounds for Homo naledi.

== Publications (selected) ==
- 2021. Montgomery, A, and Peixotto, B. Explore Paleoanthropology Fieldwork: A Virtual Expedition to Rising Star Cave (South Africa) with DinalediVR. American Biology Teacher, in press.
- 2021. Peixotto, B, Klehm, C, Eifling, K. Rethinking Field Sites as Wilderness Activity Sites. Advances in Archaeological Practice special issue Health and Wellness in Archaeology: Improving Wellness and Response, in press.
- 2020. Peixotto, B, Elliot MC. Meet Neo: Your Ancient Cousin. Frontiers for Young Minds 7:155. doi: 10.3389/frym.2019.00155.

== Awards and honors (selected) ==
- #IfThenSheCan Statue, 2022
- 2020 AAAS/IF THEN Ambassador Outreach Grant
- 2016 The Explorer's Club Washington Group Exploration and Field Research Grant
- 2016 WINGS WorldQuest Flag Carrier Award

== Early life ==
As a child, Peixotto enjoyed searching her grandparents’ old Vermont farmhouse for artifacts. She initially studied engineering at college, but according to Peixotto, "When I took my first archaeology course, it was like a lightbulb turned on! I could combine all my experiences and interests in science, the outdoors, teaching, and history, to learn more about our collective human past."

Peixotto was a Girl Scout.

== See also ==
- Dawn of Humanity
