= Dawn of Humanity =

2015 American documentary film

- DVD cover
- Genre: Documentary film
- Directed by: Graham Townsley
- Narrated by: Jay O. Sanders
- Theme music composer: Robert Neufeld
- Country of origin: United States
- Original language: English

Production
- Producer: Graham Townsley
- Editor: Emmanuel Mairesse
- Running time: 120 minutes
- Production company: National Geographic Studios

Original release
- Network: PBS
- Release: September 16, 2015

Dawn of Humanity is a 2015 American documentary film that was released online on September 10, 2015, and aired nationwide in the United States on September 16, 2015. The PBS NOVA National Geographic film, in one episode of two hours, was directed and produced by Graham Townsley. The film describes the 2013 discovery, and later excavation, of the fossil remains of Homo naledi, an extinct species of hominin assigned to the genus Homo, found within the Dinaledi Chamber of the Rising Star Cave system, located in the Cradle of Humankind, South Africa. Additionally, the National Geographic Society has multiple videos on its website covering different phases of the discovery and excavation of the fossils during a two-year period. As of September 2015, fossils of at least fifteen individuals, amounting to 1550 specimens, have been excavated from the cave.

== Participants ==
The documentary film is narrated by Jay O. Sanders and includes the following participants (alphabetized by last name):

- Rebecca R. Ackermann (University of Cape Town)
- Zeresenay Alemseged (California Academy of Sciences)
- Lee R. Berger (University of the Witwatersrand)
- Pedro Boshoff (fossil hunter)
- Steven Churchill (Duke University)
- Viktor Deak (paleo-artist)
- Marina Elliott (paleontologist)
- Elen Feuerriegel (paleoanthropologist)
- Alia Gurtov (paleontologist)
- William Harcourt-Smith (American Museum of Natural History)
- John D. Hawks (University of Wisconsin-Madison)
- Amanda Henry (Max Planck Institute for Evolutionary Anthropology)
- K. Lindsay Hunter (Sepela Field Programs)
- Rick Hunter (caver)
- Donald Johanson (Institute of Human Origins)
- Job Kibii (University of the Witwatersrand)
- Ashley Kruger (University of the Witwatersrand)
- Hannah Morris (paleoethnobotany) (Chena Consulting Group)
- Becca Peixotto (paleontologist)
- Rick Potts (Smithsonian Institution)
- Patrick Randolph-Quinney (University of the Witwatersrand)
- Brian Richmond (American Museum of Natural History)
- Peter Schmid (University of the Witwatersrand)
- Michael Tomasello (Max Planck Institute for Evolutionary Anthropology)
- Steven Tucker (caver)
- Carol Ward (University of Missouri)
- Celeste Yates (University of the Witwatersrand)

== Critical reception ==
Neil Genzlinger of The New York Times noted, "Documentaries about prehistory and paleoanthropology are usually interesting, sometimes even thought-provoking. But you don't often encounter one that's thrilling. Yet that is a fitting adjective for Dawn of Humanity, a program... that brings an aura of breaking news to a field that can often seem musty." Brooke Cain of The Charlotte Observer reports that the documentary features "exclusive footage of the hair-raising descent deep into a nearly inaccessible cave to retrieve more than 1,500 hominid fossils."

According to archaeologist K. Kris Hirst, Dawn of Humanity provides "a rich context for the discovery [of the fossils of Homo naledi], setting the historical and evolutionary background so that viewers can understand the significance of the discovery.... [Lee] Berger's charming personality and the hordes of other paleontologists in this video make this contextual effort easily and visually accessible to the public." In addition, according to Hirst, the behavior of apes in the "Dawn of Man" sequence of Stanley Kubrick's 1968 film 2001: A Space Odyssey, largely influenced by the notions of Raymond Dart and Robert Ardrey, has been proven false since such violent apes have now been shown to be vegetarians instead.
