= Gladysvale Cave =

Fossil-bearing cave in Gauteng, South Africa

Gladysvale Fossil Site, Cradle of Humankind
- Location within Gauteng
- Location: Gauteng, South Africa
- Nearest city: Krugersdorp, South Africa
- Coordinates: 25°54′S 27°45′E
- Area: Less than 200 square metres (2,200 sq ft)
- Established: Incorporated into the Cradle of Humankind1999
- Governing body: Cradle of Humankind and private landowner

Gladysvale Cave is a fossil-bearing breccia filled cave located about 13 kilometres (8.1 mi) northeast of the well-known South African hominid-bearing sites of Sterkfontein and Swartkrans and about 45 kilometres (28 mi) north-northwest of Johannesburg, South Africa. It is situated within the Cradle of Humankind World Heritage Site and is itself a South African National Heritage Site.

== History of investigations ==
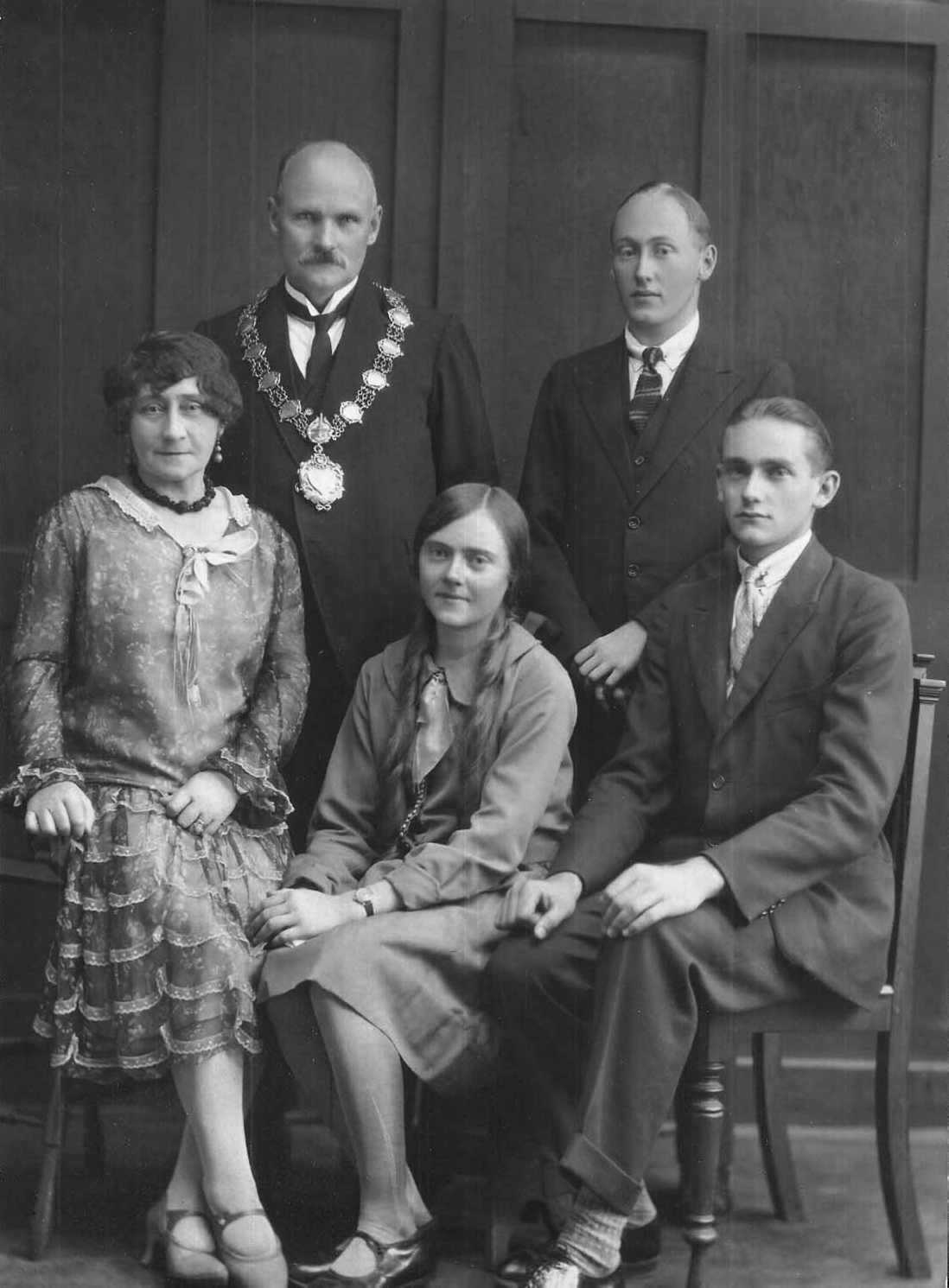
The Norton family of Krugersdorp, South Africa, with Gladys (center) after whom Gladysvale Cave is named

Gladysvale is the first cave that Robert Broom visited in the Transvaal in his mid-1930s search for a hominid-bearing cave nearer to Johannesburg than Taung. He visited Gladysvale after a butterfly collector from the Transvaal Museum reported a "human mandible" in the wall of the cave. When Broom arrived at the cave the mandible was gone. Sterkfontein soon lured Broom away from the site. In 1946 Phillip Tobias led a student expedition to the site where a fine baboon fossil was recovered. In 1948 Frank Peabody of the Camp-Peabody expedition from the United States spent several weeks at Gladysvale but failed to find any hominid remains. The site was lost from scientific memory until it was re-opened by Lee Berger and Andre Keyser in 1991. Within a few weeks of excavation the first hominid remains were discovered – two teeth of Australopithecus africanus. This discovery made Gladysvale the first new early hominid site to be discovered in South Africa since 1948 (when the last site – Swartkrans – was discovered by Robert Broom).

Since the discovery of these teeth more than a quarter of a million fossils have been recovered from Gladysvale during excavations conducted by joint teams from the University of the Witwatersrand, the University of Zurich and Duke University.

== Recovered fossils ==
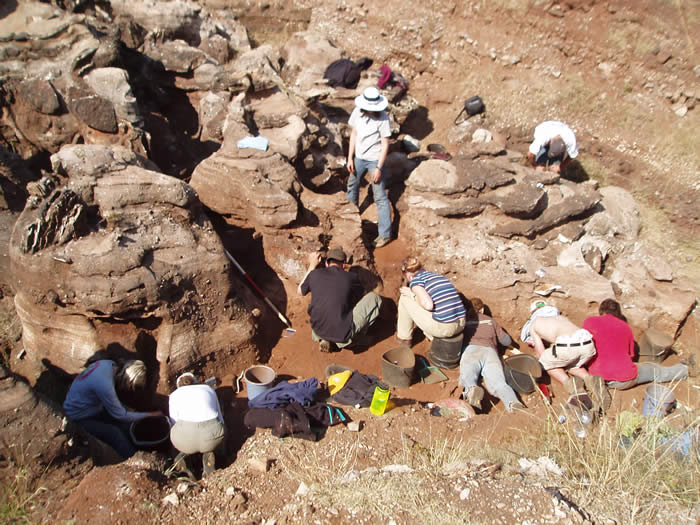
Students on a field school working in the Gladysvale external deposits

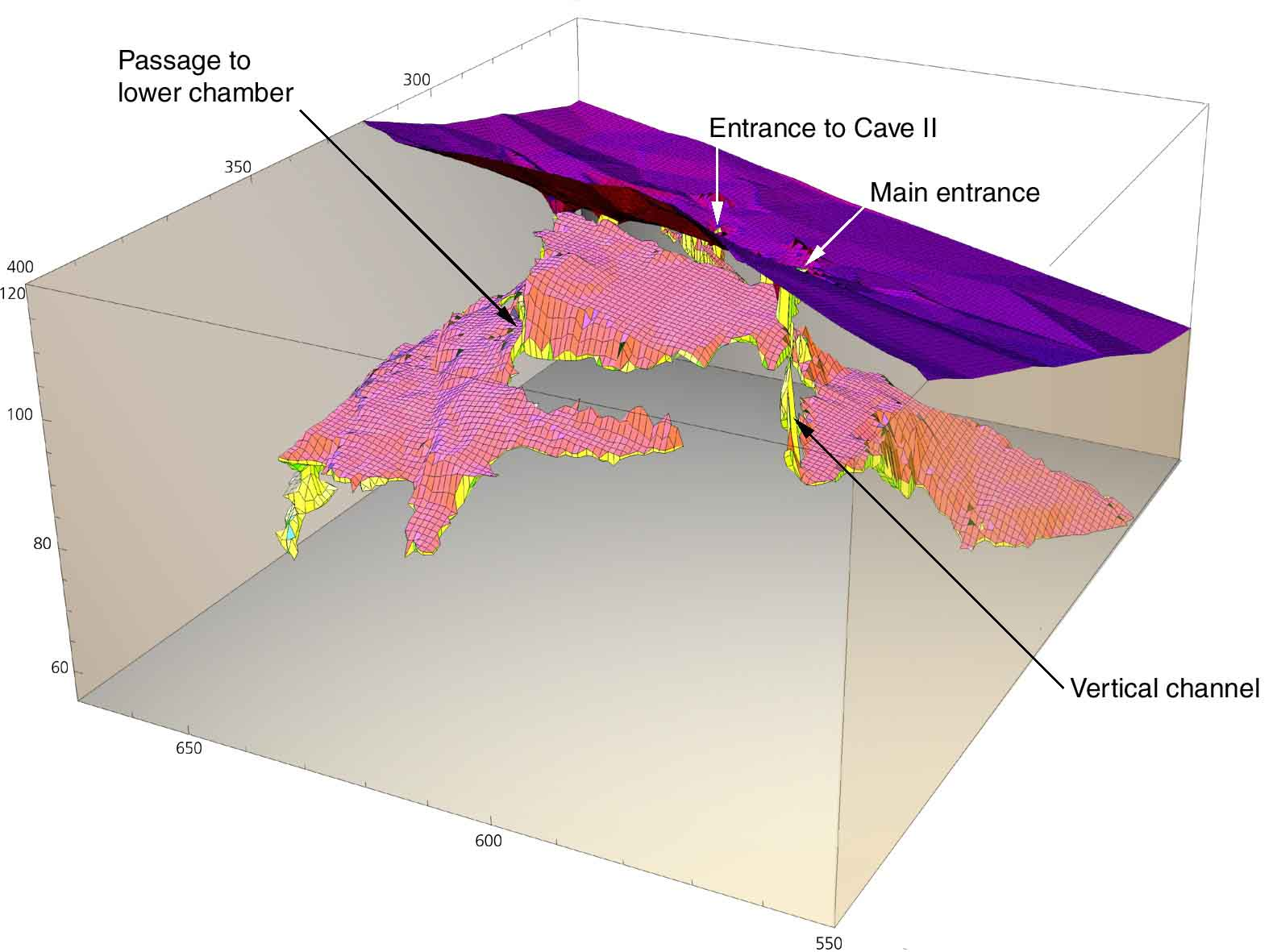
A 3-D reconstruction of the three main caves at Gladysvale

Many thousands of fossils have been recovered from the Gladysvale deposits including rare remains of hominids. From the Gladysvale external deposits, almost a quarter of a million bones have been recovered since excavations began in 1992. There are many millions of bones still in place in the cave. Fossils recovered include antelope, giant zebra, carnivores including extinct wolves, monkeys and hominids attributed to Australopithecus africanus and early Homo.

Tools have also been found with the most spectacular being an Acheulean handaxe (pictured), recovered from 1 million year old sediments.

=== Geology ===
Gladysvale has become well known for its exceptional horizontally-bedded stratigraphy and has been the site of the testing of many of the absolute dating techniques which have proved successful on the hard to date breccias of the South African fossil-bearing caves. The site is presently divided into three cave systems with the upper cave holding the Gladysvale Internal Deposits and an External Deposit (pictured in 3-D). Gladysvale was one of the first sites in Africa to be 3-D digitally mapped by Peter Schmid and students from the University of Zurich.

==== Age of the deposits ====
The Gladysvale sequence has been dated using a combination of biostratigraphy, palaeomagnetism (Andy Herries, La Trobe University, Australia), electron spin resonance and uranium series dating (Robyn Pickering, U. Melbourne, Australia). The youngest deposits are thought to be around 54,000 years old while the oldest deposits that are the likely source of the Au. africanus fossils are around 2.4–2.0 million years old. The Gladysvale External deposits contain extensive faunal remains and date to between 780,000 and 530,000 years ago. An Acheulian handaxe was recovered from internal deposits older than the Bruhnes-Matuyama boundary at 780,000 years.
