= Andre Keyser =

South African palaeontologist and geologist

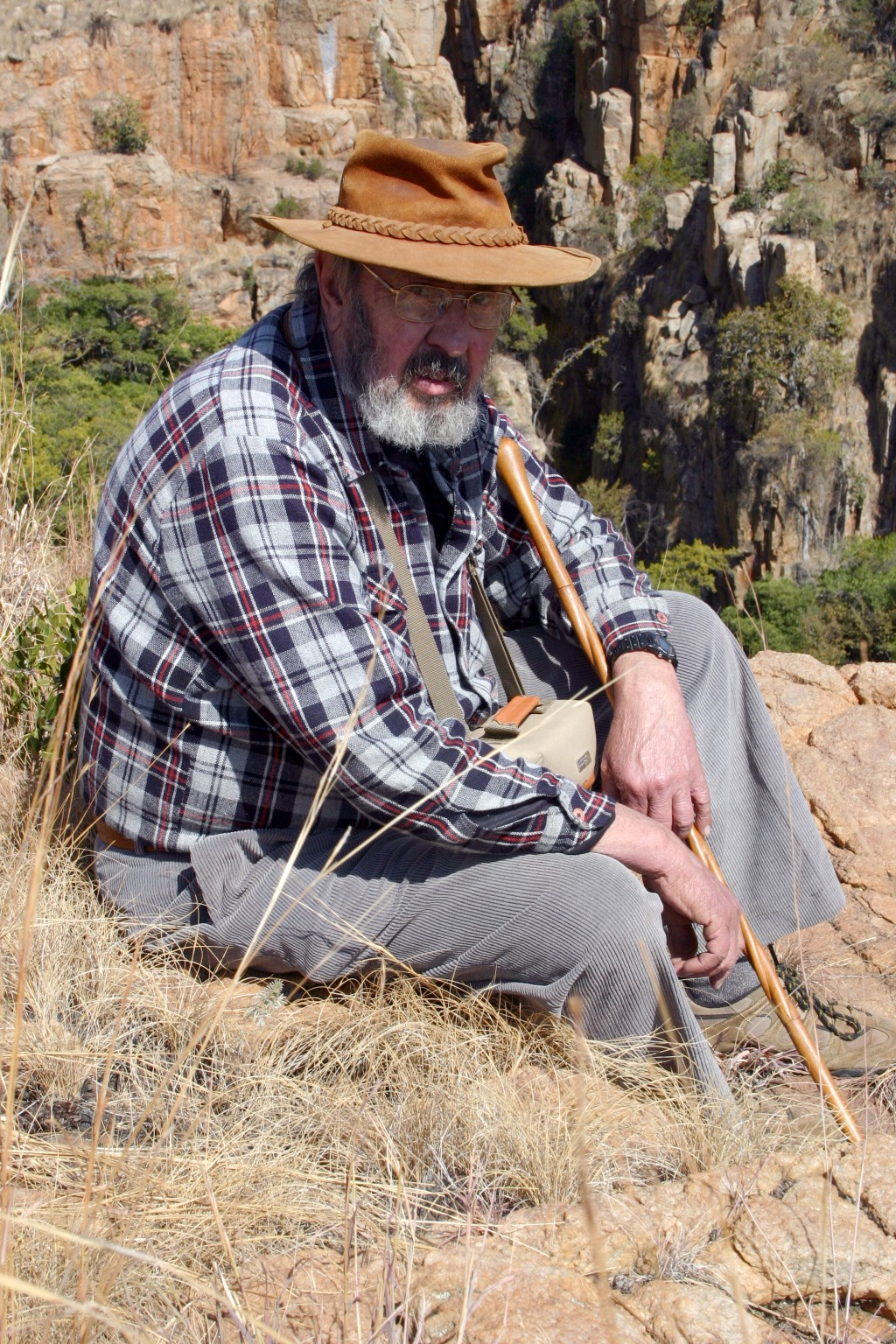
- André Keyser at Grootkloof, Magaliesberg
- Born: 8 March 1938
- Died: 15 August 2010 (aged 72)
- Scientific career
- Fields: palaeontologist and geologist
- Institutions: Bernard Price Institute for Palaeontological Research, University of the Witwatersrand

André Werner Keyser (8 March 1938, Pretoria – 15 August 2010, Pretoria), was a South African palaeontologist and geologist noted for his discovery of the Drimolen hominid site and of numerous hominid remains.

In 1994 he discovered a female Paranthropus robustus skull, nicknamed Eurydice, the most complete australopithecine skull ever excavated.

In 1997 he found two children’s skulls some 1.5 to 2 million years old. The children were under three years old at the time of their death, and were found at the Drimolen site near the Sterkfontein Caves.

In the 1930s Robert Broom, acting on a suggestion from a Transvaal Museum lepidopterist, was the first palaeontologist to visit Gladysvale Cave, hoping to find a hominid fossil cave close to Johannesburg. In 1946 Phillip Tobias recovered a baboon fossil from the site. The 1948 Camp-Peabody expedition from the United States failed to find any hominid remains. The site was then forgotten until 1991 when Lee Berger and Andre Keyser started excavations. They soon found two teeth of Australopithecus africanus, making Gladysvale the first new hominid site in South Africa since the 1948 discovery of Swartkrans by Robert Broom.

Since then the site has yielded more than a quarter of a million fossils in excavations by teams from the University of the Witwatersrand, the University of Zurich and Duke University. These fossils include, beside hominids, antelope, extinct wolves, giant zebra and monkeys.

Dr Colin Menter from the University of Johannesburg, commenting on the hominid fossils from Drimolen, stated: “Discoveries at this site showed us that sex differences in Paranthropus robustus were greater than we had previously thought. While there are some specimens from Drimolen that are just as large and robust as those from other sites like Swartkrans, there is a complete female skull that is distinctly smaller than the other, well-preserved specimens of the species.”

== Personal life ==
Eldest of three sons of Gabriel Keyser and Adelheid Dorothea Giesekke, André Keyser was married to Josina/Sienie le Roux and lived in Meyerspark, Pretoria. They had two sons and two daughters (Helena, Gawie, Liesel and Andre). He was also a painter, with a strong influence of the nature of South Africa. His death was due to cancer.
