= Kromdraai fossil site =

Archeological cave site in Gauteng, South Africa

- Location within Gauteng
- Location: Gauteng, South Africa
- Nearest city: Krugersdorp, South Africa
- Coordinates: 26°00′00″S 27°45′00″E
- Established: Incorporated into the Cradle of Humankind 1999
- Governing body: Cradle of Humankind and Private Landowner

Kromdraai (Afrikaans for "crooked turn") is a fossil-bearing breccia-filled cave located about 2 kilometres (1.2 mi) east of the well-known South African hominid-bearing site of Sterkfontein and about 45 kilometres (28 mi) northwest of Johannesburg, South Africa. It is situated within the Cradle of Humankind World Heritage Site and is itself a South African National Heritage Site.

== History of investigations ==
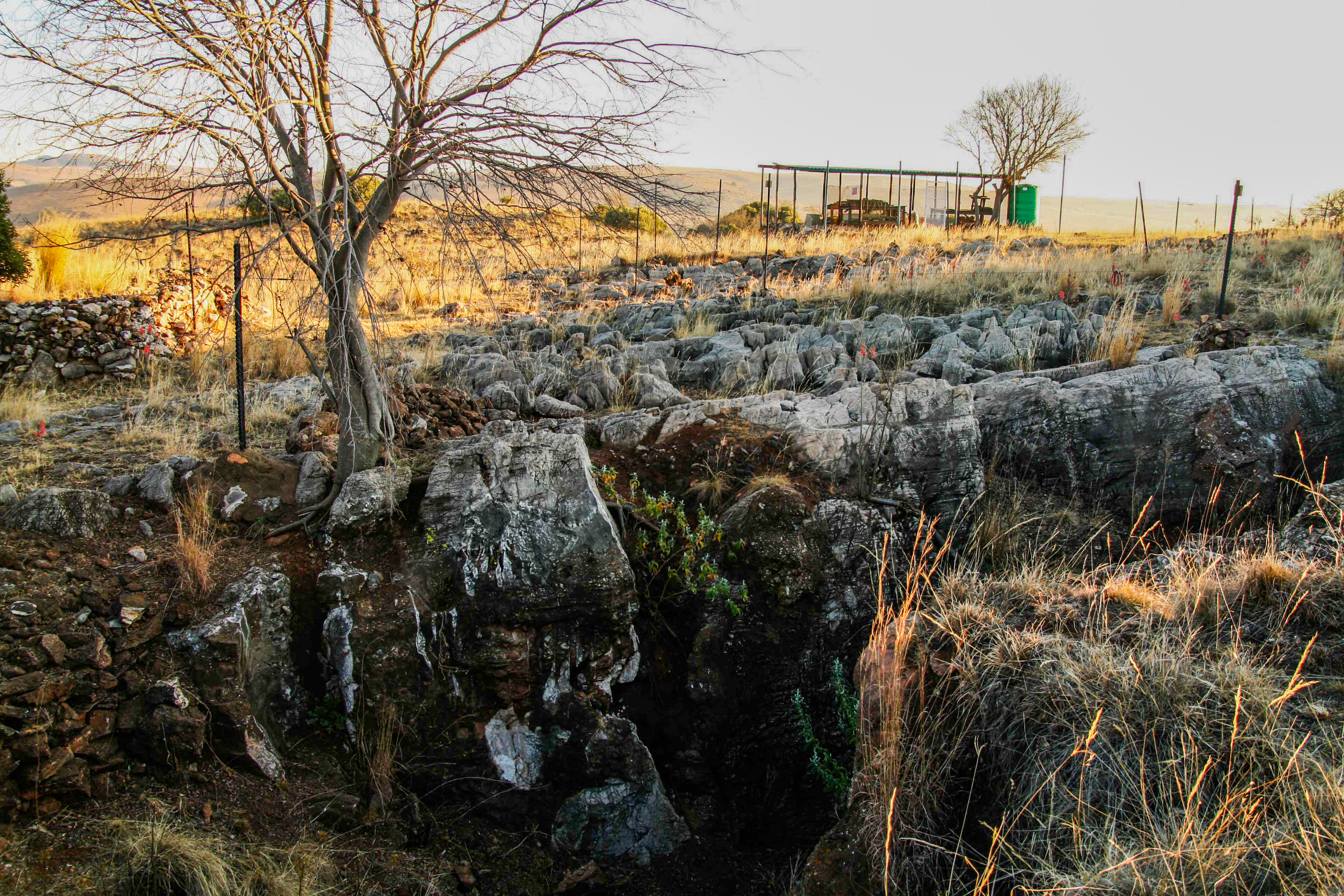
Kromdraai A viewed from the Southwest in 2007

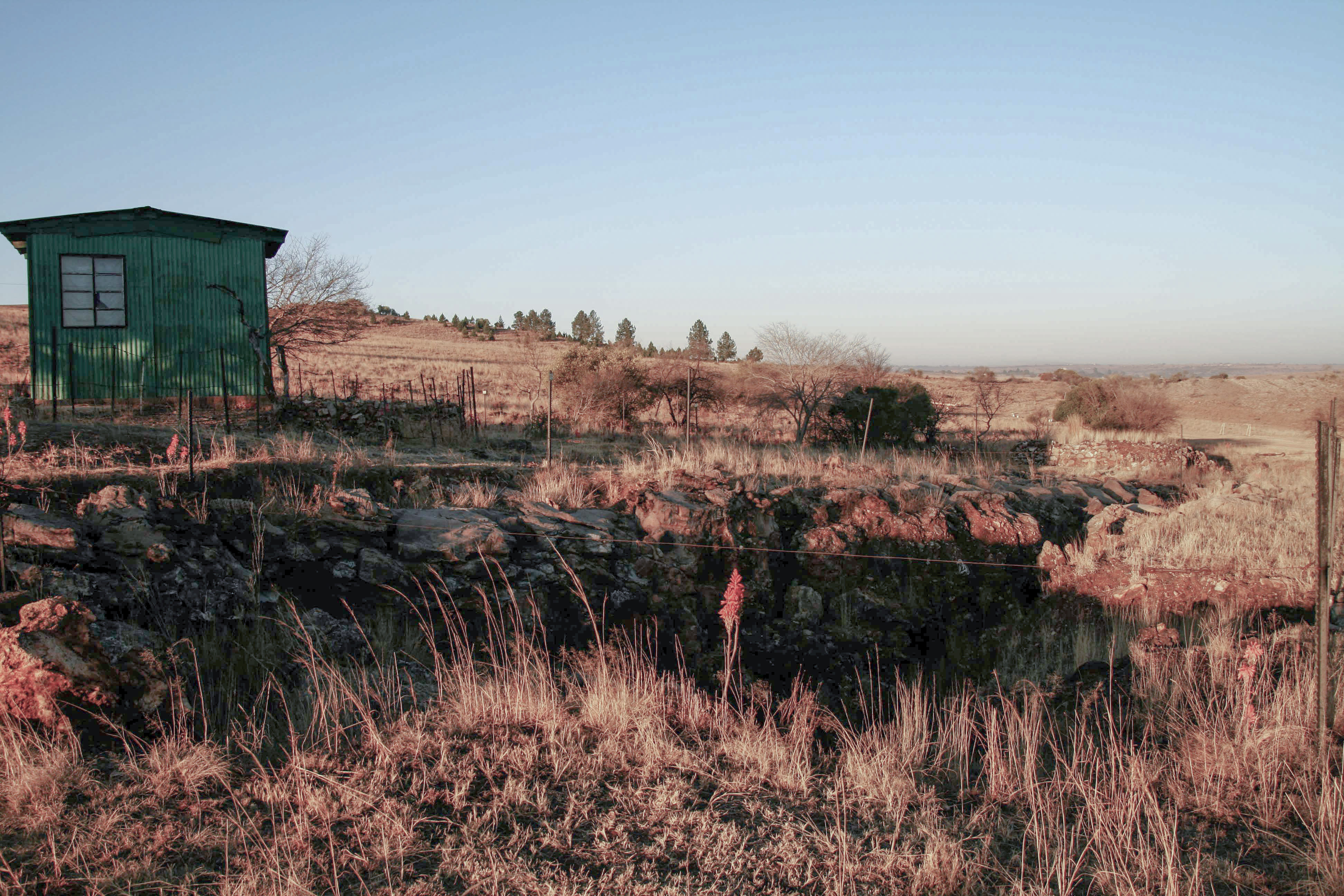
Kromdraai B viewed from the Northeast in 2007

In 1938, the site was brought to the attention of Robert Broom by a local schoolboy named Gert Terrblanche who had discovered several hominin teeth. The teeth formed part of a skull that would become the holotype of Paranthropus robustus. Broom began excavations at the site that would continue until approximately 1947 and would result in the discovery of numerous hominin remains. Two deposits were noted and named at the site — Kromdraai A (KA) and Kromdraai B (KB) — the latter being the site where the hominin remains were recovered.

In 1955 C.K. Brain recommenced work at Kromdraai B and discovered numerous additional hominin remains as well as abundant non-hominin fauna.

In the 1980s Elizabeth Vrba briefly conducted excavations at Kromdraai B in order to recover additional samples for her work on South African bovids.

In 1993 excavations were re-opened by Francis Thackeray of the Transvaal Museum and Lee Berger of the University of the Witwatersrand and are currently ongoing. Thackeray and Berger were later joined by teams from Harvard University and other collaborators. Important results of this work have been the recovery of additional hominin fossils as well as the obtaining of more accurate dates for the site.

== Recovered fossils ==
Besides the holotype specimen of P. robustus, at the time of the writing of this article 29 hominin specimens had been recovered from Kromdraai B. Many thousands of animal fossils have also been recovered from both Kromdraai A and B. By 2014, the Kromdraai B fossil assemblages totaled 6,067 specimens.

=== Age of the deposits ===
Kromdraai B is dated to between approximately 2.0 - 1.6 Ma with the majority if not all the Paranthropus robustus fossils dating to between 1.8 and 1.6 Ma.

== Geology ==
Kromdraai is a roofless dolomite cave on the southern side of Blaauwbank stream. Kromdraai is contained within the Cradle of Humankind and is approximately 2 kilometres (1.2 mi) east of the Sterkfontein fossil site. It consists of two fossil-bearing localities, Kromdraai A (KA) and Kromdraai B (KB). KA is located 30 metres (98 ft) to the south of KB. KB is the main fossil deposit at the Kromdraai site. The boundaries of both localities are lined by dolomite.

== See also ==
- Cradle of Humankind
- Hominids
- Kromdraai Conservancy
- List of fossil sites
- Paranthropus robustus
