= Malapa Fossil Site, Cradle of Humankind =

Cave in Gauteng, South Africa

- Location within Gauteng
- Location: Gauteng, South Africa
- Nearest city: Muldersdrift, South Africa
- Coordinates: 25°53′42″S 27°48′05″E
- Established: Discovered 2008
- Governing body: Cradle of Humankind Management Authority and Private Landowner

Malapa is a fossil-bearing cave located about 15 kilometres (9.3 mi) northeast of the well known South African hominid-bearing sites of Sterkfontein and Swartkrans and about 45 kilometres (28 mi) north-northwest of Johannesburg, South Africa. It is situated within the Cradle of Humankind World Heritage Site.

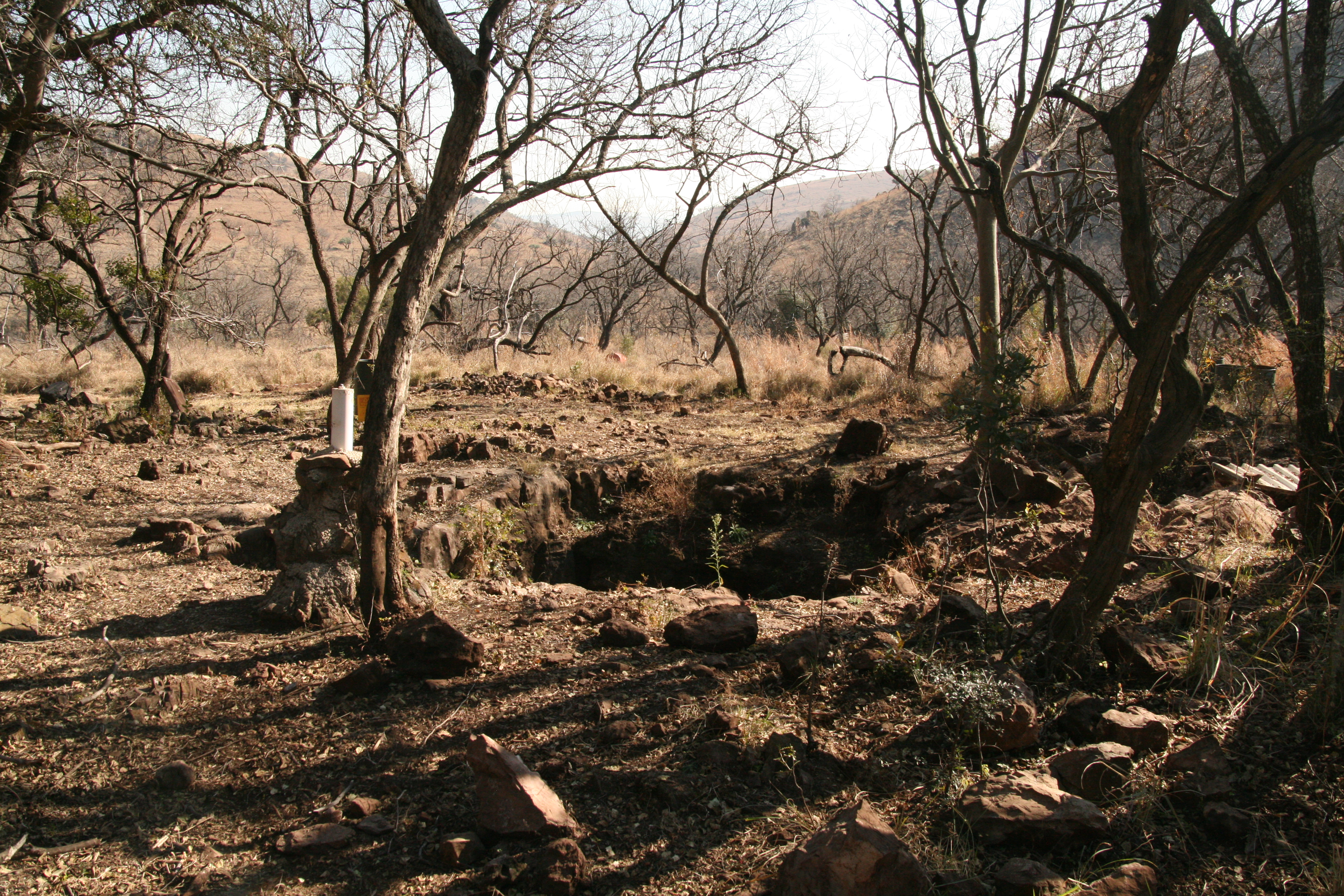
The Malapa fossil site, viewed from the South, August 2011, Malapa Nature Reserve, South Africa

== History of investigations ==
In March 2008, Lee Berger of the University of the Witwatersrand, South Africa, undertook an exploration project in the Cradle of Humankind World Heritage site outside of Johannesburg, in order to map the known caves identified by him and his colleagues over the past several decades, and to place known fossil sites onto Google Earth so that information could be shared with colleagues. The area is important as nearly a third of the entire evidence for human origins in Africa comes from just a few sites in this region, and the region is arguably one of the most explored areas in Africa for evidence of human origins, having been investigated continuously since the first discoveries were made there in 1935.

At the beginning of this project, there were approximately 130 known cave sites in the region and around twenty fossil deposits. By July 2008, the pattern of cave distribution seen on Google Earth by Berger as well as the recognition of what these deposits looked like from satellites and significant amounts of searching on the ground had led Berger to discover almost 500 caves that scientists had not plotted or identified previously. Included in this were more than 25 fossil sites that had been unknown to science, all in probably the most explored region in Africa. Berger brought in geologist Paul Dirks, at that time Head of the School of GeoSciences at the University of the Witwatersrand, to lead the geological aspects of this exploratory project.

In late July 2008, Berger noted in Google Earth a series of caves running along a fault that pointed to a blank area in the region, an area that appeared to have clusters of trees that typically marked cave deposits. On 1 August he dropped off Dirks to map the recognized cave system and proceeded into the uninvestigated area with his dog Tau, a Rhodesian Ridgeback who accompanied him on almost all his explorations. Almost immediately he discovered a rich fossil site that was unknown to science, in the vicinity of more than three dozen caves that had been apparently unrecognized by previous researchers.

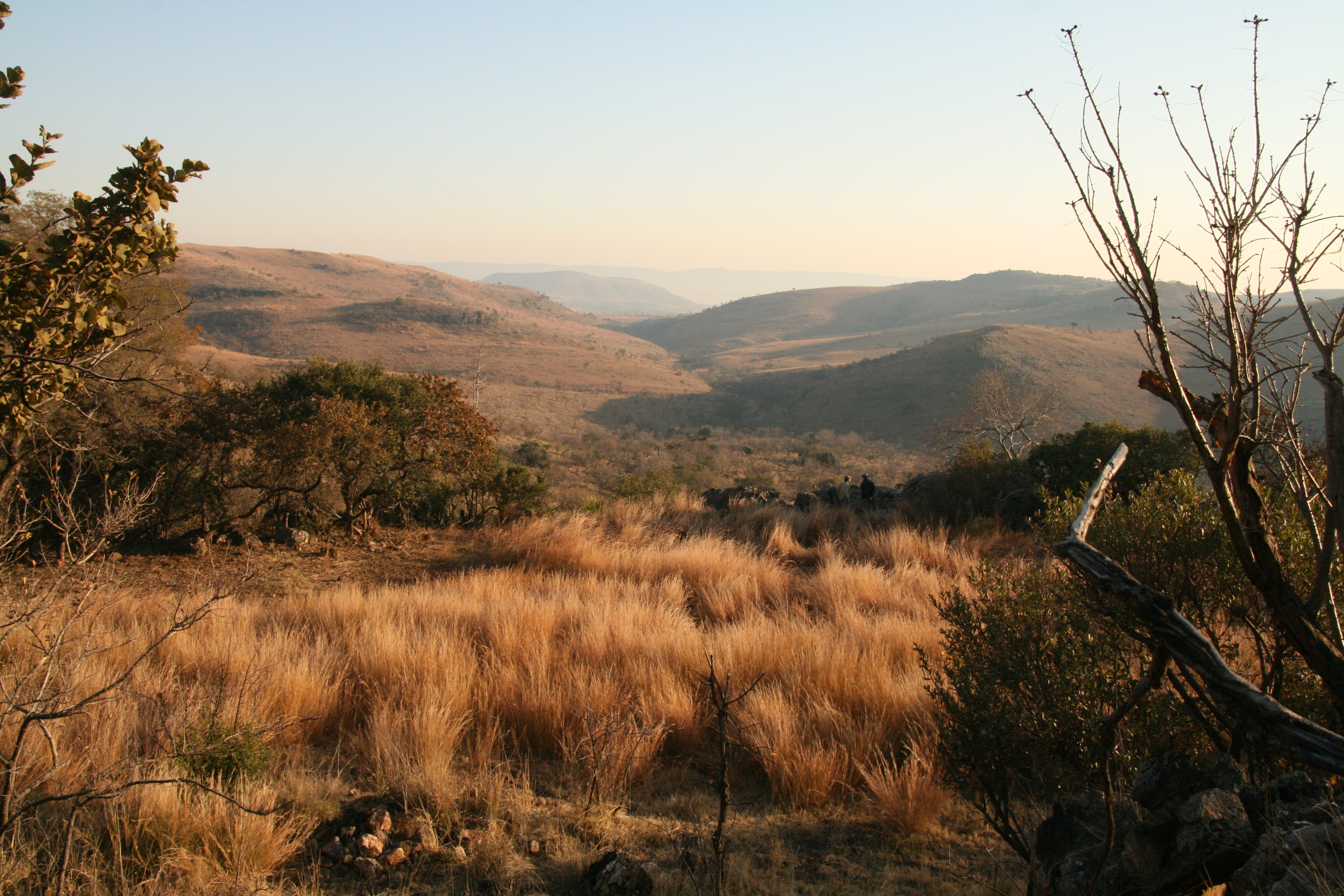
A view of the Malapa valley, Malapa Nature Reserve, South Africa in 2012. The Malapa site is in the valley below the hill.

On 15 August, Berger returned to the site with his post-doctoral student, Dr. Job Kibii, and Berger's 9-year-old son Matthew. Within minutes, Matthew Berger had discovered the first remains of early human ancestors - a clavicle, or collar bone. On the opposite side of the block, Berger quickly discovered a jawbone with a canine tooth of a hominid. The find was later identified as part of a partial skeleton of a juvenile hominid, around 9 – 13 years of age.

On 4 September 2008, Berger returned to the site with more than a dozen colleagues, where Berger discovered a second partial skeleton of an adult female.

== Recovered fossils ==
The site has produced arguably one of the most complete assemblages of early human ancestors ever found, including the most complete skeletons of early hominids yet discovered, and by far the most complete remains of any hominid dating to around 2 million years ago. Over 200 elements have been recovered to date. The partial skeletons are initially described in two papers in the journal Science by Berger and colleagues as a new species of early human ancestor called Australopithecus sediba (sediba meaning natural spring or well in Sotho).

In addition to the fossils revealed initially, rocks collected from the site have been examined with CT scans and contain even more bones, suggesting that the type specimen, Karabo, will become even more complete.

The species is suggested by the authors to be a good candidate for being the transitional species between the southern African ape-man Australopithecus africanus (the Taung Child, Mrs. Ples) and either Homo habilis or even a direct ancestor of Homo erectus (Turkana Boy, Java Man, Peking Man). The species has long arms, like an ape, short powerful hands, a very advanced pelvis, and long legs capable of striding and possibly running like a human.

The skeletons were found among the articulated skeletons of a sabre-toothed cat, antelopes and even mice and hares.

=== Geology ===
The fossils are preserved in a hard, concrete-like substance known as calcified clastic sediments that formed at the bottom of what appears to be a shallow underground lake or pool that was possibly as much as 50 metres (160 ft) underground at the time. It is not known how these skeletons came to be in this pool, but it appears that they may have taken a significant fall. No carnivores or scavengers reached their bodies.

=== Age of the deposits ===
The fossil was dated using a combination of paleomagnetism and uranium-lead (U-Pb) dating by Andy Herries (La Trobe University, Australia), Robyn Pickering (University of Melbourne, Australia) and Jan Kramers (University of Johannesburg, South Africa). U-Pb dating of the underlying flowstone indicates that the fossils are not older than 2.0 million years old. The occurrence of species of animal that became extinct ~1.5 million years ago indicate the deposit is not younger than 1.5 million years old. The sediments have a 'normal' magnetic polarity, and the only major period between 2.0 and 1.5 million years ago when this occurred was the Olduvai sub-Chron between 1.95 and 1.78 million years ago, and so in 2010 the fossil was suggested to be around 1.95 million years old based on the transitional nature of some of the sediments and the stratigraphy at the site. In 2011 a more accurate date of the fossils was established when a capping flowstone was too old to enable the normal polarity deposits to date to the Olduvai event. The deposits were instead correlated to a ~3000 year long period centred at around 1.977 million years ago and known as the Pre-Olduvai event.

== See also ==
- List of fossil sites
