= Unknown: Cave of Bones =

Netflix documentary

- Directed by: Mark Mannucci
- Edited by: Alex Ricciardi
- Music by: Francesco Le Metre
- Release date: July 17, 2023
- Running time: 93 minutes
- Country: United States
- Language: English

Unknown: Cave of Bones is a Netflix documentary about paleontologist Lee Berger's work at Rising Star Cave.

The film was released on July 17, 2023, and presents Berger's argument that the extinct hominin Homo naledi deliberately buried its dead and carved markings into the cave walls. The documentary premiered less than a week after the underlying research appeared as preprints, and it drew criticism from other researchers, who argued that the evidence did not support the burial and rock-art claims shown in the film.
