= Alia Gurtov =

American paleoanthropologist

- Education: Wellesley College (BA, 2007); Leiden University (MS, 2009); University of Wisconsin Madison (MS, 2012, PhD 2016)
- Known for: Discovery of Homo naledi
- Scientific career
- Fields: Palaeoanthropology
- Institutions: University of Wisconsin Madison
- Thesis: Dental microwear analysis of Early Pleistocene hominin foraging seasonality.

Alia Gurtov is an American paleoanthropologist who is known for being one of the six Underground Astronauts of the Rising Star Expedition.

== Education ==
Gurtov attended Wellesley College, majoring in French and anthropology. In 2006, she was granted a Jerome A Schiff Fellowship for her research project "Using the Past in the Construction of National Identity"

In 2007, Gurtov obtained a B.A.in anthropology from Wellesley and was awarded the Thomas J. Watson Fellowship for 2007–2008. During that year, she participated in research and field work in China, Germany, Netherlands, South Africa, and Turkey.

From 2008 to 2009 Gurtov attended Leiden University, Netherlands where she obtained a master's degree in prehistoric archaeology. She returned to the U.S.to pursue further studies at the University of Wisconsin Madison, receiving her master's degree in anthropology in 2012 and a PhD in archaeology and biological anthropology in 2016.

== Rising Star Expedition ==
In October 2013, Gurtov, along with five other scientists, was chosen to be part of a critical excavation team for the Rising Star Expedition. The purpose of the twenty-one day expedition, sponsored by The National Geographic Society and the University of the Witwatersrand, Johannesburg was to excavate fossils which had been recently found in a deep cave complex in the Rising Star Cave System, near Johannesburg, South Africa.

The critical skills and physical attributes sought for the excavation team by lead scientist and University of the Witwatersrand professor Lee Berger were: a " master's degree or higher in palaeontology, archeology or an associated field; caving experience; and the ability to fit through an 18-centimeter (about 7-inch) space. The six women scientists were crucial in the successful "excavation of arguably one of the most important fossil finds in human history – a new species referred to as Homo naledi.

Gurtov, along with Hannah Morris, Marina Elliott, Becca Peixotto, K. Lindsay Hunter and Elen Feuerriegel, and with the support of a team of sixty international scientists, excavated "one of the richest collections of hominin fossils ever discovered—some 1,550 fossil fragments, belonging to at least 15 individual skeletons."

== Awards ==
- 2014 – Leakey Foundation Grant
- 2013 – Wellesley college graduate fellowship recipient 2013–2014 Edna V. Moffett Fellowship
- 2007 – Thomas J. Watson Fellowship
- 2006 – Jerome A. Schiff Fellowship

== Selected publications ==
- "Assessing eye orbits as predictors of Neandertal group size" in American Journal of Physical Anthropology, 157(2015), pp. 680–683. (with Sarah Traynor, John Hawks, Jess Hutton Senjem)
- "Lower Paleolithic bipolar reduction and hominin selection of quartz at Olduvai Gorge, Tanzania: What's the connection?" in Quaternary International, 322–323 (2014), pp. 285–291. (with Eren Metin)
- "Prey mortality profiles indicate that Early Pleistocene Homo at Olduvai was an ambush predator" in Quaternary International, 322-323 (2014), pp. 44–53. (with Henry T. Bunn)

== See also ==
- Dawn of Humanity
