= Rising Star Cave =

Fossiliferous dolomite cave system in Gauteng, South Africa

- Location within Africa Location within South Africa Location within Gauteng Location within Greater Johannesburg
- Location: Near Krugersdorp in the West Rand municipality of Gauteng province, South Africa
- Entrances: Many
- Hazards: narrow access

The Rising Star cave system (also known as Westminster or Empire cave) is located in the Malmani dolomites, in Bloubank River valley, about 800 meters (0.50 miles; 2,600 feet) southwest of Swartkrans, part of the Cradle of Humankind World Heritage Site in South Africa. Recreational caving has occurred there since the 1960s. In 2015, fossils found there two years prior were determined to be a previously unknown extinct species of hominin named Homo naledi.

== Names ==
In the 1980s, the names "Empire", "Westminster", and "Rising Star" were used interchangeably.

The discovered species's name, homo naledi (using the Sesotho for "star"), and the "Dinaledi Chamber" (using the Sesotho word for "stars") were so named by members of the Rising Star Expedition in reference to the species and chamber's location in Rising Star Cave.

A portion of the cave, used by the excavation team en route to the Dinaledi Chamber, is called "Superman's Crawl" because most people can fit through only by holding one arm tightly against the body and extending the other above the head, in the manner of Superman in flight.

The Superman Crawl opens into the "Dragon's Back Chamber," which includes an approximately 15-metre (49-foot) exposed climb up a ridge of a sharp-edged dolomite block that fell from the roof sometime in the distant past. This block is the so-called Dragon's Back, so named because the climbing route appears to progress from the tail to the head along the spiked spine of a mythical beast.

== History ==
Geologists think the cave in which the fossils were discovered is no older than three million years.

The cave was explored in the 1980s by the Speleological Exploration Club (SEC), a local branch of the South African Speleological Association (SASA).

=== Discovery of fossils in "Dinaledi Chamber" ===
A cross-section of a portion of the Rising Star cave system leading to the Dinaledi Chamber

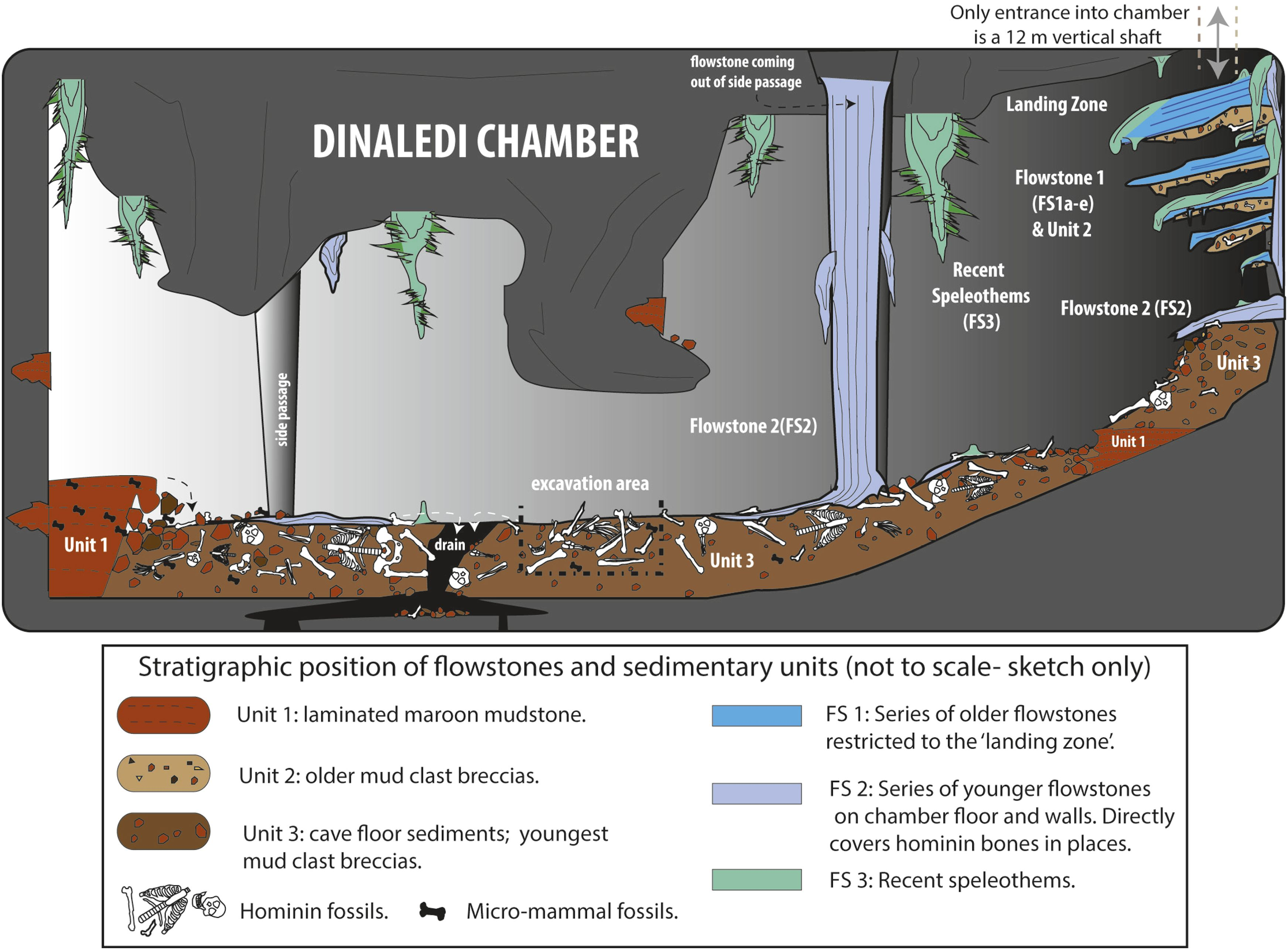
An illustration of the Dinaledi Chamber, where H. naledi bones were excavated

On 13 September 2013, while exploring the Rising Star cave system, recreational cavers Rick Hunter and Steven Tucker of the Speleological Exploration Club (SEC) found a narrow, vertically oriented "chimney" or "chute" measuring 12 m (39 ft) long with an average width of 20 cm (7.9 in). Then Hunter discovered a room 30 m (98 ft) underground (Site U.W.101 or UW-101, the Dinaledi Chamber), the surface of which was littered with fossil bones. On 1 October, photos of the site were shown to Pedro Boshoff and then to Lee Berger, both of the University of the Witwatersrand.

The arrangement of bones, as well as several survey pegs, suggested "someone had already been there" as recently as a few decades earlier. The appearance of limited fossilisation initially led the explorers to think the bones were from the last caver into the chamber, who had subsequently never made it back out alive.

=== 2013 and 2014 excavations ===
Berger organized an expedition to excavate the fossils, which started on 7 November 2013. The expedition was funded by the South African National Research Foundation and the National Geographic Society.

The Dinaledi Chamber was assigned the designation UW-101 (or U.W.101) and was excavated by the six "Underground Astronauts" (see below) of the Rising Star Expedition during November 2013. More than 1,200 fossil elements were recovered and catalogued in November 2013, representing at least a dozen individuals. Only 20 out of 206 bones in the human body were not found in the cave as of Summer 2014. By April 2014, between two localities, 1,754 specimens were recovered.

The layered distribution of the bones (in clay-rich sediments) suggests that they had been deposited over a long period of time, perhaps centuries. Only one square meter of the cave chamber has been excavated; other remains might still be there.

On 20 February 2014, Rick Hunter, Lee Berger, John Hawks, Alia Gurtov, and Pedro Boshoff returned to Rising Star to evaluate a second potential site. The site, designated UW-102 (or U.W.102, aka Lesedi Chamber), was found by cavers Rick Hunter and Steve Tucker on the last day of the first Rising Star Expedition, and limited excavation began in April 2014.

As of September 2015, fossils of at least fifteen individuals, amounting to 1,550 specimens, had been excavated from the cave. About 300 bone fragments were collected from the surface of the Dinaledi Chamber, and about 1,250 fossil specimens were recovered from the chamber's main excavation pit, Unit 3. The fossils include skulls, jaws, ribs, teeth, bones of an almost complete foot, of a hand, and of an inner ear. The bones of both old and young individuals, as well as infants, were found.

The 15 partial skeletons, which were found in a small underground chamber, invite speculation on the circumstances of their location. Paleoanthropologist John D. Hawks, from the University of Wisconsin–Madison, who is a member of the team, has stated that the scientific facts are that all the bones recovered are hominin, except for those of one owl; there are no signs of predation, and there is no predator that accumulates only hominins this way; the bones did not accumulate there all at once. There is no evidence of rocks or sediment having dropped into the cave from any opening in the surface, nor any evidence of water flowing into the cave carrying the bones into the cave.

Hawks concluded that the best hypothesis is that the bodies were deliberately placed in the cave after death, by other members of the species. Berger et al. suggest that "these individuals were capable of ritual behaviour." They speculate that the placing of dead bodies in the cave was a ritualistic behaviour, a sign of symbolic thought. "Ritual" here means an intentional and repeated practice (disposing of dead bodies in the cave), and not implying any type of religious rite. This hypothesis has been criticised for its improbability.

A study involving the statistical reconstruction of hominin evolutionary trees from skull and tooth measurements, originally indicated that the most likely age for H. naledi was 912 kya.

The age of the original Homo naledi remains from the Dinaledi Chamber has been revealed to be startlingly young in age. Homo naledi, which was first announced in September 2015, was alive sometime between 335 and 236 thousand years ago. This places this population of primitive small-brained hominins at a time and place that it is likely they lived alongside Homo sapiens.

— Wits University 9 May 2017

A collaborative workshop involving 54 local and international scientists took place in May 2014 at the University of the Witwatersrand. On 10 September 2015, the fossils were publicly unveiled and given the name Homo naledi.

=== Recent finds ===
In June 2026, researchers extracted and analyzed ancient proteins from the tooth enamel of at least 20 individuals of Homo naledi. Proteomic analysis detected only AMELX enamel proteins and no male-specific AMELY proteins, indicating that all analyzed individuals were likely female. The findings challenge previous assumptions about the composition of the assemblage and have been interpreted as supporting the possibility of sex-specific mortuary practices, although researchers noted that alternative explanations, including genetic factors, require further investigation. The study also demonstrates the potential of ancient protein analysis for investigating extinct hominin populations in contexts where ancient DNA is poorly preserved.

=== Dating ===
The fossils of the Dinaledi chamber have been dated to between 335,000 and 236,000 years ago, long after much larger-brained and more modern-looking hominins had appeared. Geologists estimate that the cave in which the fossils were discovered is no older than three million years, and the ages for flowstone where the fossils were recovered from was interpreted to be deposited between 236,000 and 414,000 years ago.

=== Rock engravings ===
In 2023, Berger published a preliminary report that described rock engravings on a pillar in the Hill Antechamber, near where bodies were found. They are "deeply impressed cross-hatchings and other geometric shapes. The surfaces bearing these engravings appear to have been prepared and smoothed." Berger goes on to note, "If confirmed, the antiquity, intentionality, and authorship of the reported markings will have profound archaeological implications, as such behaviors are otherwise widely considered to be unique to our species, Homo sapiens." However, it does concede the discovery requires more work to confirm who made the markings and when. In addition, Berger found evidence of extensive fire use in the cave, presumably to provide light.

=== "Underground Astronauts" ===
A group of six women scientists initially excavated the cave. Because of the difficulty and danger involved in reaching the Dinaledi Chamber, the six were given the nickname "Underground Astronauts." They had been selected by the expedition leader, Lee Rogers Berger, who posted a message on Facebook asking for scientists with experience in paleontological excavations and caving. Specifically he needed scientists who were small and slender enough to crawl through very narrow spaces. Within ten days of the post, Berger had received almost sixty applicants and chose six scientists to make up his expedition team. Berger's use of social media to recruit early-career researchers for excavation and analysis drew some criticism. While his unconventional recruitment methods and transparency of documenting the process via daily blogs and radio won him the nickname "Mr. Paleodemocracy," some of his colleagues at the time thought the expedition "had more hype than substance".

The six scientists had to pass through three points of difficult terrain in the cave to reach the bone chamber. The first is referred to as "Superman's Crawl," which required one arm held forward to pass, similar to Superman's flight. They then had to climb vertically up a rock surface, known as the "Dragon's back," and finally pass through a slender opening and descend 30 meters into the Dinaledi chamber.

The team was composed of:

- Hannah Morris, archaeologist.
- Alia Gurtov is a University of Wisconsin – Madison Ph.D. candidate researching the effects of seasonality on hominin foraging at Olduvai Gorge, Tanzania.
- Marina Elliott is originally from Calgary, Canada, and has a master's degree in biological anthropology from Simon Fraser University, Canada.
- Elen Feuerriegel, then a PhD candidate at the Australian National University, studying shoulder biomechanics with Colin Groves in Oldowan stone tool manufacture.
- Becca Peixotto is an archaeologist and Ph.D. student in the Department of Anthropology at American University in Washington, D.C.
- K. Lindsay (née Eaves) Hunter is a biological anthropologist and currently serves as the Community Engagement and Advancement Director for CARTA, the UC San Diego/Salk Center for Academic Research & Training in Anthropogeny, in La Jolla, CA. Following the 2013 expedition, Lindsay married Rick Hunter, one of the co-discoverers of Homo naledi.

== Geology ==
The Rising Star cave system lies in the Bloubank River valley, 2.2 km west of Sterkfontein Cave. It comprises an area of 250 × 150 m of mapped passageways situated in the core of a gently west-dipping (17°) open fold, and it is stratigraphically bound to a 15–20-metre-thick, stromatolitic dolomite horizon in the lower parts of the Monte Christo Formation. This dolomite horizon is largely chert-free but contains five thin (<10 cm) chert marker horizons that have been used to evaluate the relative position of chambers within the system. The upper contact is marked by a 1–1.3-metre-thick, capping chert unit that forms the roof of several large cave chambers. The height above sea level is 1,450 m for the Dinaledi Chamber's floor.

== See also ==
- Unknown: Cave of Bones (2023 Netflix documentary)
- Dawn of Humanity (2015 PBS film)
- Gondolin Cave
