= Scott M. Fitzpatrick =

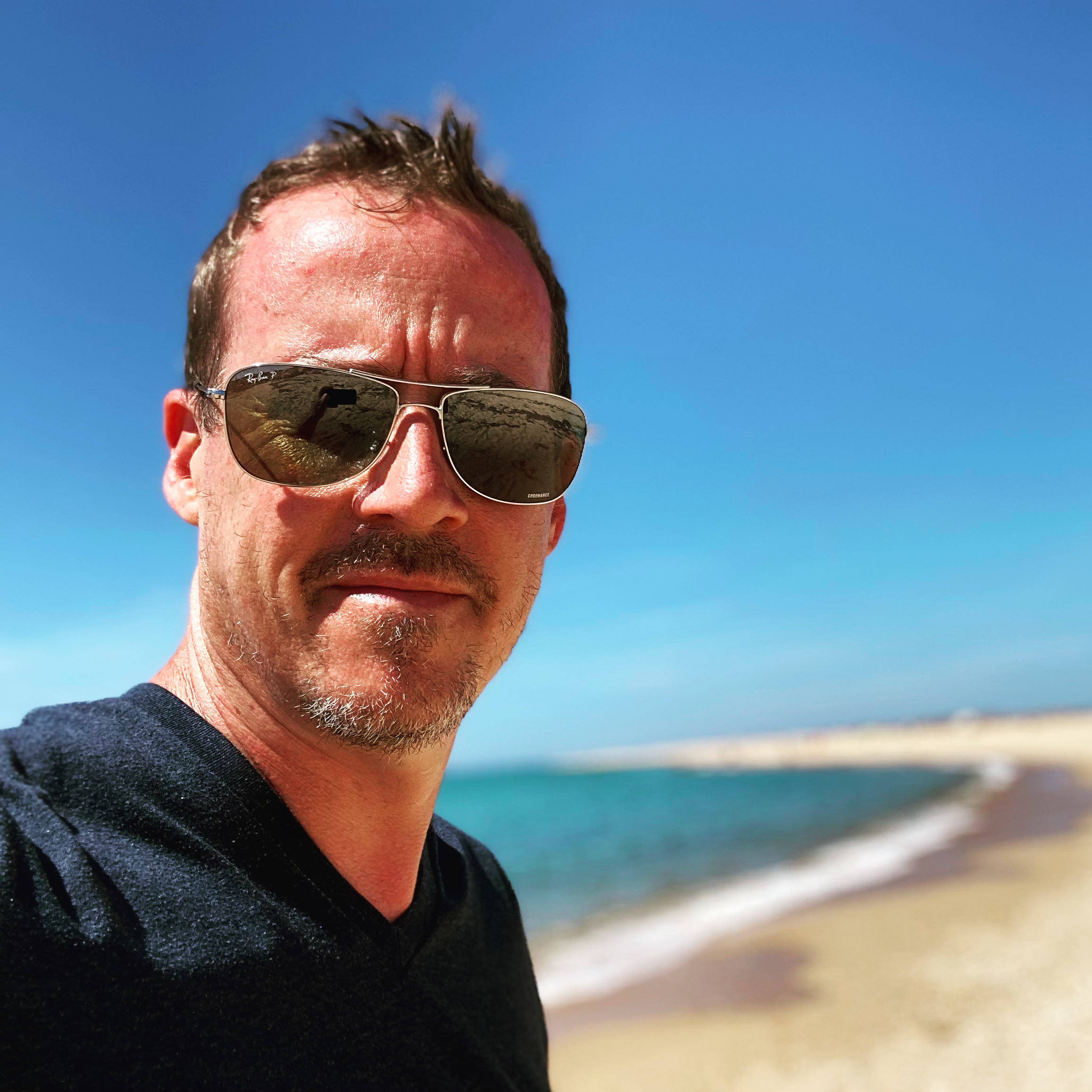

Scott M. Fitzpatrick is a professor in the Department of Anthropology and curator of Indo-Pacific archaeology at the Museum of Natural and Cultural History at the University of Oregon. He is a specialist in the prehistory and historical ecology of island and coastal regions of the Pacific and Caribbean. His research has focused on colonization events, seafaring strategies, adaptations to smaller islands, exchange systems, and human impacts on ancient environments. He has conducted archaeological research in the Caribbean and Pacific Islands with other projects having taken place in Panama, the Florida Keys, and Oregon Coast. He has published several books and more than 140 journal articles and book chapters. Fitzpatrick is the founding co-editor of The Journal of Island and Coastal Archaeology (Routledge/Taylor & Francis), an associate editor for Archaeology in Oceania, a Review Editor for Frontiers in Human Dynamics, and serves on the editorial boards for the Caribbean Journal of Science and Journal of Archaeological Science: Reports. Fitzpatrick is also a research associate at the National Museum of Natural History, Smithsonian Institution and a research affiliate at the Florida Museum of Natural History.

== Education and background ==
Fitzpatrick was born in Moses Lake, Washington, and spent the first seven years of his life in Warden, Washington, which had a largely Mexican migrant farming community. His parents were both school teachers and many of his early friends and students that his parents taught were Hispanic. He later moved to Creswell, Oregon, where he spent his formative years. His father, a two-time state wrestling champion from Williston, North Dakota, often took Fitzpatrick and his brother to sporting events at the University of Oregon, including football games and wrestling matches. He later joined the University of Oregon Children's Choir.

After completing grade school, his family moved to Spokane, Washington, to be closer to his parents' families where he attended Northwood Middle School, Mead Senior High School, and Eastern Washington University. His first experience doing archaeology was as an undergraduate in central Washington State where he worked with faculty at EWU and Archaeological and Historical Services. His first major archaeological experience came in 1993 when he traveled to Barbados and England to work alongside Dr. Peter Drewett from the Institute of Archaeology in London. Fitzpatrick received dual B.A. (1994) degrees in anthropology and criminal justice from Eastern Washington University graduating cum laude. He also completed an M.A. (1996) in anthropology from the University of Montana, an M.S. (2003) in Historic Preservation from the University of Oregon, and his Ph.D. (2003) in anthropology from the University of Oregon.

Scott Fitzpatrick has worked extensively on islands in the Caribbean since 1993, focusing primarily on those in the southern Lesser Antilles such as Carriacou, Mustique, and Barbados. Upon beginning his PhD at the University of Oregon in 1996, Fitzpatrick began working in Micronesia, where he conducted his dissertation research on the quarrying and transport of Yap's famous stone money which took place in Palau's Rock Islands. He initially worked with the Palau Historic Preservation Office in 1997 to write their five-year plan and then continued work over the years in close collaboration with Indigenous Palauan archaeologists.

After graduating from the University of Oregon, he was hired as an assistant professor in the Department of Sociology and Anthropology at North Carolina State University in Raleigh, North Carolina. He received tenure in 2009 and later returned to the University of Oregon in 2012, rising to the rank of full professor in 2015. His research has been funded by National Geographic, the National Science Foundation, the Sasakawa Peace Foundation, and Department of Interior, to name a few.

== Publications ==
=== Books ===
- Voyages of Discovery: The Archaeology of Islands (editor)(Prager 2004), ISBN 9780275979478
- Island Shores, Distant Pasts: Archaeological and Biological Perspectives on the Pre-Columbian Settlement of the Caribbean (co-editor) (University Press of Florida, 2017), ISBN 9780813063140
- Ancient Psychoactive Substances (editor) (University Press of Florida, 2018). ISBN 9780813068183
- Sustainability in Ancient Island Societies: An Archaeology of Human Resilience (co-editor) (University Press of Florida, 2024). ISBN 9780813069975

== Most cited peer-reviewed articles ==
- Erlandson JM, Fitzpatrick SM. Oceans, islands, and coasts: current perspectives on the role of the sea in human prehistory. Journal of Island & Coastal Archaeology. 2006 Jul 1;1(1):5-32.(Cited 245 times, according to Google Scholar)
- Stephens L, Fuller D, Boivin N, Rick T, Gauthier N, Kay A, Marwick B, Armstrong CG, Barton CM, Denham T, Douglass K. Archaeological assessment reveals Earth’s early transformation through land use. Science. 2019 Aug 30;365(6456):897-902. (Cited 216 times, according to Google Scholar )
- Fitzpatrick SM, Keegan WF. Human impacts and adaptations in the Caribbean Islands: an historical ecology approach. Earth and Environmental Science Transactions of the Royal Society of Edinburgh. 2007 Mar;98(1):29-45. (Cited 182 times, according to Google Scholar.)
- Fitzpatrick SM. A critical approach to 14C dating in the Caribbean: using chronometric hygiene to evaluate chronological control and prehistoric settlement. Latin American Antiquity. 2006 Dec;17(4):389-418.(Cited 118 times, according to Google Scholar.)

His most recent article is Louys J, Braje TJ, Chang CH, Cosgrove R, Fitzpatrick SM, Fujita M, Hawkins S, Ingicco T, Kawamura A, MacPhee RD, McDowell MC. No evidence for widespread island extinctions after Pleistocene hominin arrival. Proceedings of the National Academy of Sciences. 2021 May 18;118(20). (open access)
