= Marina Elliott =

Canadian biological anthropologist

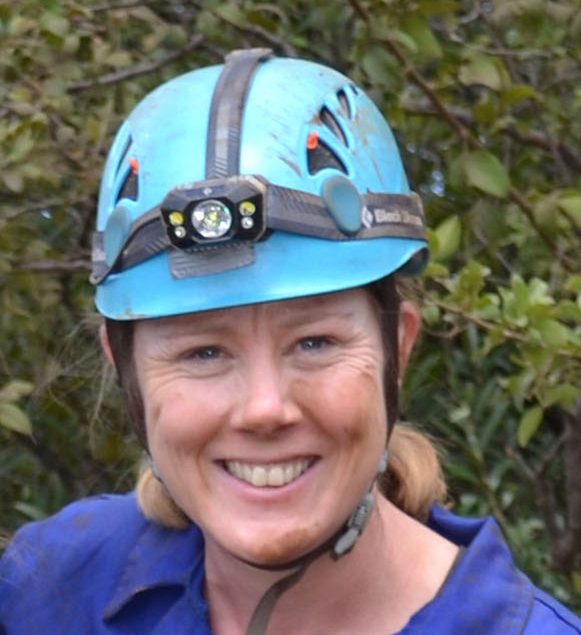
- Marina Elliott
- Education: Simon Fraser University; University of the Witwatersrand
- Known for: Discovery of Homo naledi
- Scientific career
- Fields: biological anthropology palaeoanthropology
- Institutions: University of the Witwatersrand

Marina Elliott is a Canadian biological anthropologist, who is known for being one of the six Underground Astronauts of the Rising Star Expedition.

Eliott has a Master's degree and PhD in biological anthropology from Simon Fraser University in British Columbia, Canada. Elliott has participated in excavations at Lake Baikal in southern Siberia, and at the northernmost archaeological site in the USA: Nuvuk on Point Barrow, Alaska.

While working on her PhD in 2013, Eliott was chosen to be part of a small team of scientists to excavate the Rising Star Cave near Johannesburg, South Africa. Her background in archaeology, caving experience and the ability to squeeze through narrow spaces made Elliott an ideal match for the select team.

She is currently a researcher at the Evolutionary Studies Institute, University of the Witwatersrand, Johannesburg, working on excavations at and around the Rising Star Cave. Elliott's research focuses on the archaeology and anatomy of the human skeleton, forensic anthropology and the archaeology of death and burial.

== Awards ==
In 2016, Elliott was awarded the National Geographic Society Emerging Explorer Award. "The program recognizes and supports uniquely gifted and inspiring scientists, conservationists, storytellers and innovators who are making a difference early in their careers."

== Selected publications ==
- Berger, LR; et al. (2017). "Homo naledi and Pleistocene hominin evolution in subequatorial Africa". eLife. 9 (6). doi:10.7554/eLife.24234. PMC 5423770. PMID 28483041.
- Elliott, Marina; et al. (2015). "Estimating body mass from postcranial variables: an evaluation of current equations using a large known-mass sample of modern humans". Archaeological and Anthropological Sciences. 8 (4): 689–704. doi:10.1007/s12520-015-0251-6. S2CID 126828739.
- Elliott, Marina; et al. (2014). "Estimating fossil hominin body mass from cranial variables: an assessment using CT data from modern humans of known body mass". American Journal of Physical Anthropology. 154 (2): 201–214. doi:10.1002/ajpa.22493. PMID 24615366.
- Elliott, Marina; Collard, Mark (2009). "FORDISC and the determination of ancestry from cranial measurements". Biology Letters. 5 (6): 849–852. doi:10.1098/rsbl.2009.0462. PMC 2827999. PMID 19586965.

== See also ==
- Dawn of Humanity
