= Elen Feuerriegel =

Australian palaeoanthropologist

- Education: University of Queensland (BA, 2011); Australian National University (M. Biol. Anth., 2012; PhD, 2017)
- Known for: Discovery of Homo naledi
- Scientific career
- Fields: Palaeoanthropology
- Workplaces: University of Washington
- Thesis: Biomechanics of the Hominoid Shoulder: Entheseal Development and Manual Manipulation (2016)
- Doctoral advisor: Colin Groves

Elen Feuerriegel is an Australian palaeoanthropologist, known for being one of the "underground astronauts" of the Rising Star Expedition. She is also a clinical research scientist at the University of Colorado Denver where she specialises in COVID-19 and HIV clinical trials.

== Career ==
Feuerriegel studied anthropology at the University of Queensland (BA, 2011) and the Australian National University (M. Biol. Anth, 2012). She then began work on a PhD at ANU, under the supervision of Colin Groves, which she completed in 2017. Her thesis was on the biomechanics of the hominoid shoulder and its role in tool-making (flint knapping), and included research on Homo naledi fossils from Rising Star Cave in South Africa.

In 2013, whilst a PhD student, Feuerriegel responded to an advertisement on Facebook calling for "skinny, highly-qualified paleontologists" with caving experience. The advertisement was placed by Lee Berger, who was recruiting a team to recover hominid fossils he had discovered in the difficult-to-access Dinaledi Chamber of Rising Star Cave. This expedition was part of a National Geographic sponsored study called the "Rising Star Expedition" and she was one of only six scientists, all women, who entered the cave. Feuerriegel's analysis of the fossils uncovered in the cave were published in an issue of Nature dedicated entirely to the expedition. As part of the expedition Feuerriegel helped excavate the fossils, which were subsequently assigned to a new species of human, Homo naledi. She has a special interest in the functional morphology of the upper limb (shoulder and elbow) and hand and, as such, also studied the Home naledi upper limb bones.

Following this expedition Feuerriegel spent some time working as a part-time lecturer at the University of Washington within the Department of Anthropology before starting work as a clinical research scientist at the University of Colorado where she is a study program manager looking at the long-term effects of COVID-19.

== Selected publications ==
- Berger, Lee R; et al. (2015). "Homo naledi, a new species of the genus Homo from the Dinaledi Chamber, South Africa". eLife. 4. doi:10.7554/eLife.09560. ISSN 2050-084X. PMC 4559886. PMID 26354291.
- Feuerriegel, Elen M.; et al. (2017). "The upper limb of Homo naledi". Journal of Human Evolution. 104: 155–173. Bibcode:2017JHumE.104..155F. doi:10.1016/j.jhevol.2016.09.013. PMID 27839696.
- Hawks, John; et al. (2017). "New fossil remains of Homo naledi from the Lesedi Chamber, South Africa". eLife. 6. doi:10.7554/eLife.24232. ISSN 2050-084X. PMC 5423776. PMID 28483039.
