= Phillip Tobias =

South African palaeoanthropologist (1925–2012)

Phillip Tobias FRS
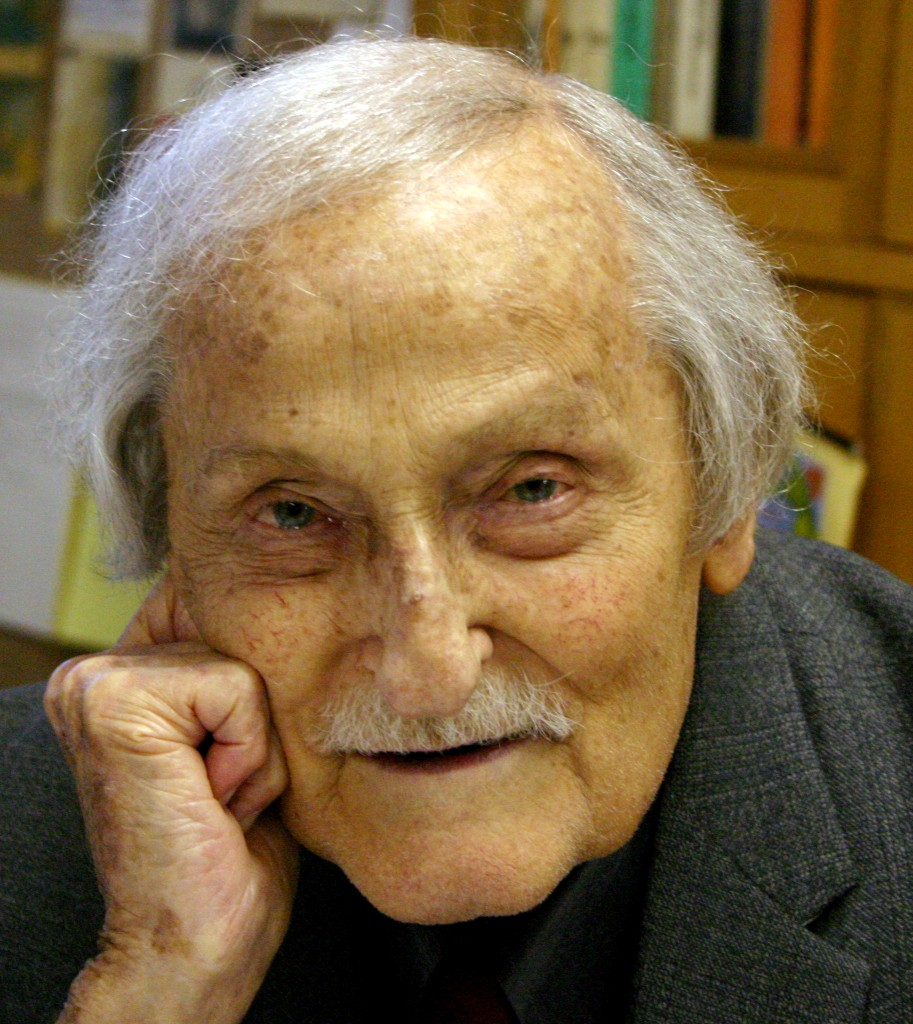
- Born: Phillip Vallentine Tobias; 14 October 1925; Durban, Natal, Union of South Africa
- Died: 7 June 2012 (aged 86); Johannesburg, South Africa
- Education: University of Witwatersrand
- Known for: Paleoanthropological and evolutionary work
- Scientific career
- Fields: Anthropology
- Thesis: Chromosomes, Sex Cells, and Evolution in the Gerbil (1953)

Phillip Vallentine Tobias FRS (14 October 1925 – 7 June 2012) was a South African palaeoanthropologist and Professor Emeritus at the University of the Witwatersrand in Johannesburg. He was best known for his work at South Africa's hominid fossil sites. He was also an activist for the eradication of apartheid and gave numerous anti-apartheid speeches at protest rallies and also to academic audiences.

== Academic life ==
Born in Durban, Natal on 14 October 1925, the only son and second child of Joseph Newman Tobias and his wife, Fanny (née Rosendorff), Phillip received his first schooling in Bloemfontein at St Andrew's School and in Durban at the Durban High School. In 1945, he started his career as demonstrator in histology and instructor in physiology at the University of Witwatersrand. He received his Bachelor of Science (Hons) in Histology and Physiology in 1946–1947. In 1948 he was elected President of the National Union of South African Students (NUSAS). He graduated in Medicine, Bachelor of Medicine, Bachelor of Surgery in 1950. He was appointed as a lecturer in anatomy in 1951. In 1953, he received his Doctor of Philosophy for a thesis entitled Chromosomes, Sex-Cells, and Evolution in the Gerbil.

In 1955, Tobias started his post-graduate research at the University of Cambridge, England, where he filled the position of Nuffield Dominion Senior Traveling Fellow in physical anthropology. The following year, at the University of Michigan at Ann Arbor and the University of Chicago, he was the Rockefeller Traveling Fellow in anthropology, human genetics, and dental anatomy and growth. In 1959, he became Professor and Head of the Department of Anatomy and Human Biology at the University of the Witwatersrand, succeeding his mentor and eminent scholar, Professor Raymond Dart. In 1967, he was awarded a Doctor of Science in palaeoanthropology for his work on hominid evolution. During this period he attended the University of the Witwatersrand. He was Dean of Medicine from 1980 to 1982. He was appointed Honorary Professor of Palaeoanthropology at the Bernard Price Institute for Palaeontological Research in 1977 and Honorary Professor in Zoology in 1981. Also in 1981, Tobias became a founding member of the World Cultural Council.

Tobias excavated at the Sterkfontein caves and worked at almost all other major sites in Southern Africa after 1945. He also opened some 25 archaeological sites in Botswana during the French Panhard-Capricorn Expedition while conducting a biological survey of the Tonga People of Zimbabwe. He was one of the anthropologists instrumental in unmasking the Piltdown fraud.

== Research ==
His research had been mainly in the fields of paleoanthropology and the human biology of Africa's various populations. He had studied the Kalahari San, the Tonga people of Zambia and Zimbabwe, and numerous peoples of Southern Africa. Tobias is best known for his research on hominid fossils and human evolution, having studied and described hominid fossils from Indonesia, Israel, Kenya, Namibia, South Africa, Tanzania, Zimbabwe and Zambia. His best known work was on the hominids of East Africa, particularly those of the Olduvai Gorge. Collaborating with Louis Leakey, Tobias identified, described and named the new species Homo habilis. Cambridge University Press published two volumes on the fossils of Homo habilis from the Olduvai Gorge. He is closely linked with the archaeological excavation at the Sterkfontein site, a research programme he initiated in 1966. The Sterkfontein caves, which were already well known by his predecessor, Professor Raymond Dart, were used as a vehicle for introducing the second year anatomy students to anthropology and have seen the most sustained excavation of a single site in the world. This site has yielded the largest single sample of Australopithecus africanus as well as the first known example of Homo habilis from Southern Africa. It is now a World Heritage Site.

He published in 1970 an article in which he questioned the link between brain-size, race and intelligence.

== Achievements and awards ==
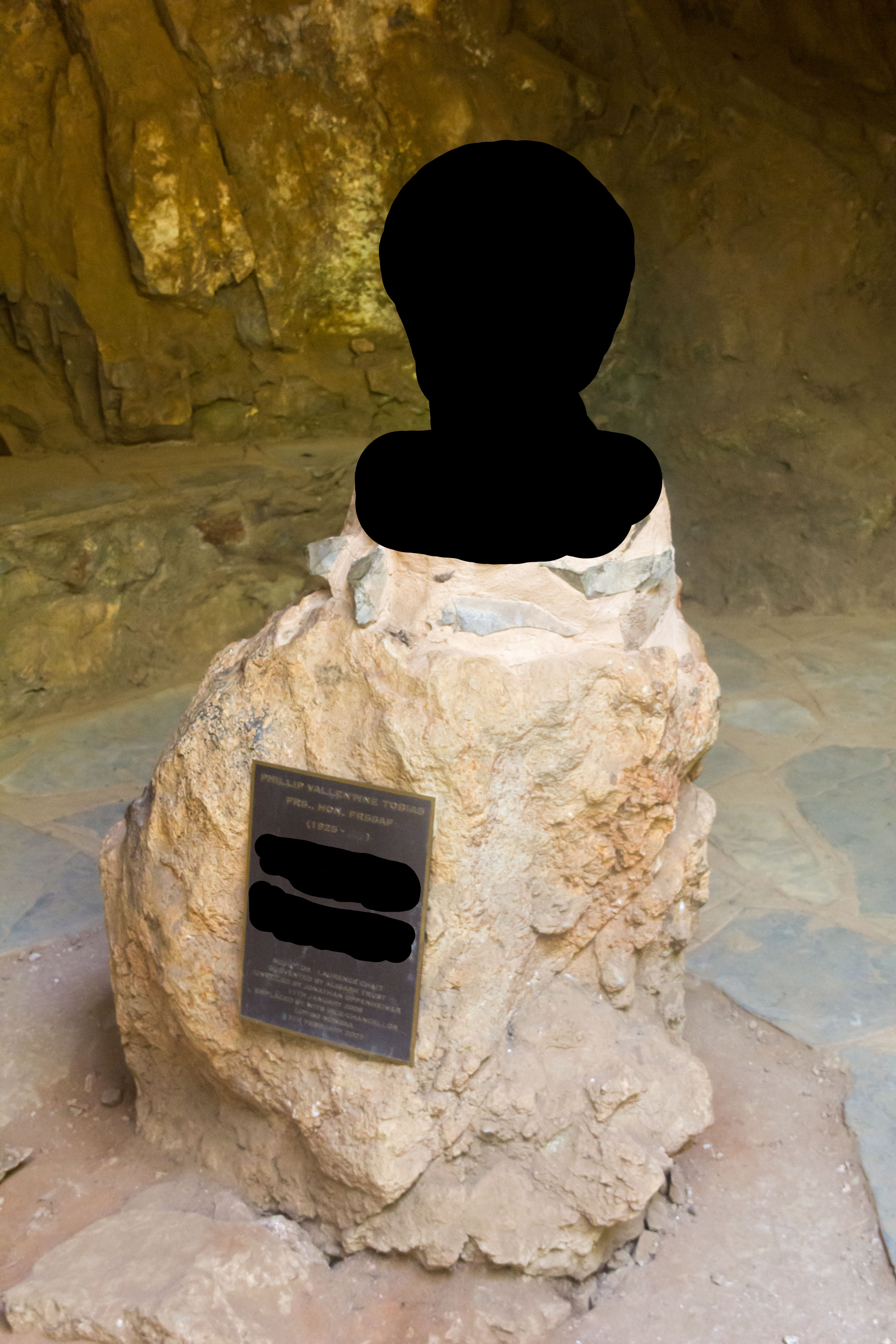
Bust of Tobias at the Sterkfontein caves

Tobias is one of South Africa's most honoured and decorated scientists, and a world leading expert on human prehistoric ancestors; he had been nominated three times for a Nobel Prize, received a dozen honorary doctorates and been awarded South Africa's Order for Meritorious Service. Tobias published over 600 journal articles and authored or co-authored 33 books and edited or co-edited eight others. He has received honorary degrees from seventeen universities and other academic institutions in South Africa, the United States of America, Canada and Europe. He has been elected as a fellow, associate or honorary member of over 28 learned societies. These include being elected a foreign associate of the National Academy of Sciences (USA), a Fellow of the Royal Society of London (1996), and a member of both the American Academy of Arts and Sciences and the American Philosophical Society.

Among the medals, awards and prizes he had received are the Balzan Prize for Physical Anthropology (1987) and the Charles R. Darwin Lifetime Achievement Award of the American Association of Physical Anthropologists (1997). The Royal Society of South Africa is very sparing with its honours, and Tobias was one of only two South African Honorary Fellows of the Society and one of very few recipients of its senior medal, the John Herschel Medal.

He held the positions of Professor Emeritus of Anatomy and Human Biology at the University of the Witwatersrand, Honorary Professor of Palaeo-anthropology, Honorary Professorial Research Associate and Director of the Sterkfontein Research Unit, and Andrew Dickson White Professor-at-Large of Cornell University, Ithaca, New York USA. He has been a visiting professor at the University of Pennsylvania, University of KwaZulu-Natal, Cambridge University and other institutions.

== Books ==
- Humanity from Naissance to Coming Millennia – This book covers important recent advances in human biology and human evolutionary studies. The contributions cover a wide range of topics, from Human Biology, Human Evolution (Emerging Homo, Evolving Homo, Early Modern Humans), Dating, Taxonomy and Systematics, to Diet and Brain Evolution.
- Into the Past – In this autobiographical work Tobias recounts the first 40 years of his life through anecdotes, experiences and philosophies.
- Images of Humanity: Selected Writings of Phillip V. Tobias Hardcover – 31 December 1991; ISBN 978-1874800231 – This is a valuable collection of the writings of an acclaimed academic who made important contributions to the sciences and humanities. Always wary of intense specialization, Tobias over the years fostered an interest in the human, social, anthropological and historical sciences. His early studies were in medicine, his PhD was awarded for his thesis.

== Death ==
On 7 June 2012, Tobias died after a long illness, at a Johannesburg hospital aged 86. He was buried at the West Park Jewish Cemetery in Johannesburg on 10 June 2012.
