= Lee Berger (paleoanthropologist) =

American-South African anthropologist (born 1965)

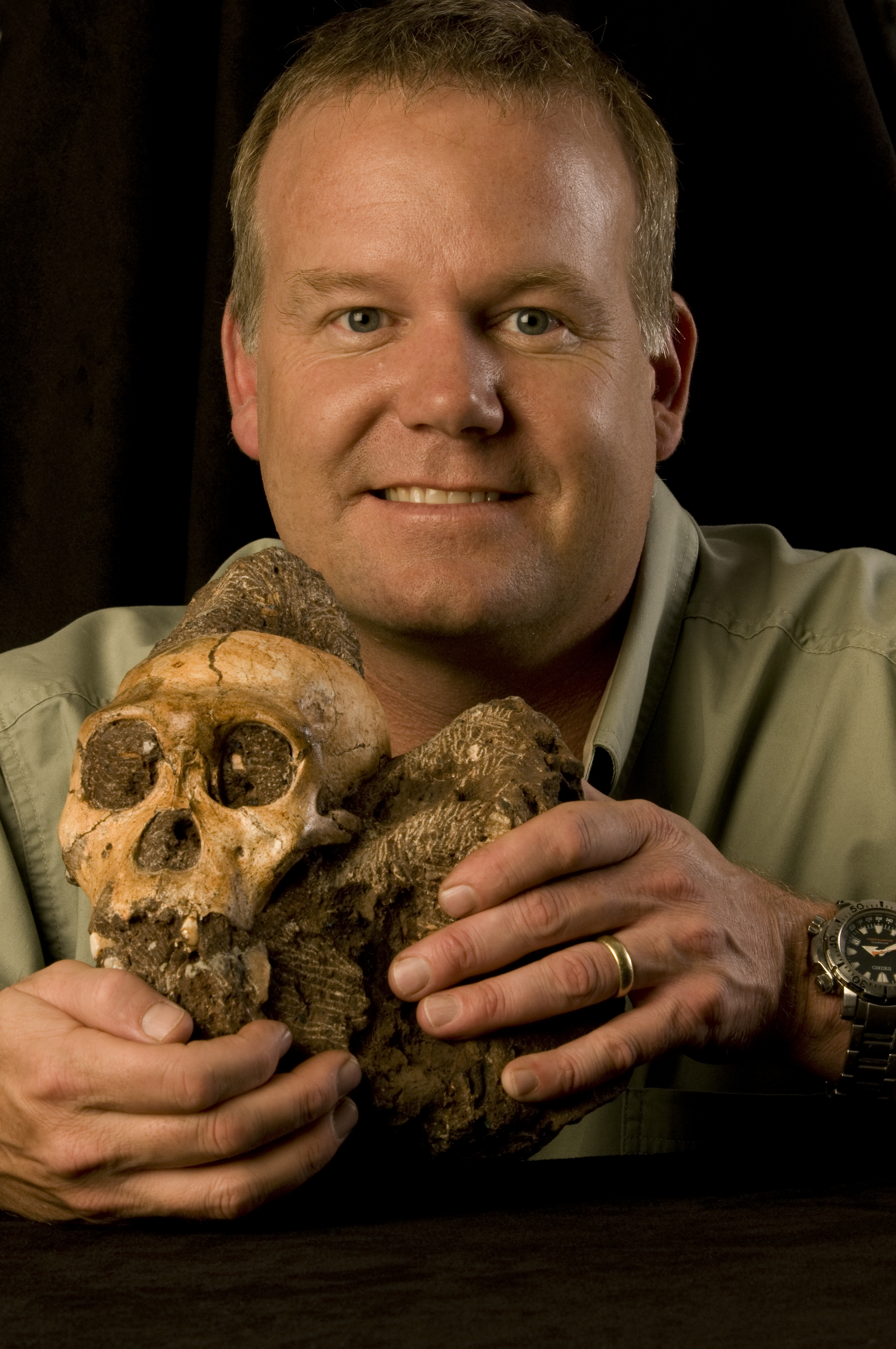
- Born: Lee Rogers Berger; December 22, 1965 (age 60); Shawnee Mission, Kansas, U.S.
- Citizenship: United States; South Africa (since 1993)
- Education: Georgia Southern University; University of the Witwatersrand
- Spouse: Jacqueline Berger
- Children: 2
- Awards: Time 100, 2016 - most influential people in the American world
- Scientific career
- Fields: Paleoanthropologist and National Geographic Explorer-in-Residence
- Workplaces: University of the Witwatersrand
- Thesis: Functional morphology of the hominoid shoulder, past and present. (1994)
- Doctoral advisor: Phillip V. Tobias
- Website: www.profleeberger.com

Lee Rogers Berger (born December 22, 1965) is an American-South African paleoanthropologist and National Geographic Explorer-in-Residence. He is best known for his discovery of the Australopithecus sediba type site, Malapa; his leadership of Rising Star Expedition in the excavation of Homo naledi at Rising Star Cave; and the Taung Bird of Prey Hypothesis.

Berger is known not only for his discoveries, but also for his unusually public persona in paleoanthropology, and for making his most notable discoveries open-access projects. He gives hundreds of talks per year, and has had a close relationship with National Geographic for many years, appearing in several of their shows and documentaries.

== Early life and education ==
Berger was born in Shawnee Mission, Kansas in 1965, but was raised outside of Sylvania, Georgia in the United States. As a youth, Berger was active in the Boy Scouts, Future Farmers of America, and president of Georgia 4-H. In 1984, Berger was named Georgia's Youth Conservationist of the Year for his work in conserving the threatened gopher tortoise. He is a Distinguished Eagle Scout, and received the Boy Scouts of America Honor Medal for saving a life in 1987.

He graduated from Georgia Southern University in 1989 with a degree in anthropology/archaeology and a minor in geology.

He undertook doctoral studies in palaeoanthropology at the University of the Witwatersrand (Wits) in South Africa under Professor Phillip Tobias, focusing his research on the shoulder girdle of early hominins; he graduated in 1994. In 1991, he began his long term work at the Gladysvale site. This marked the same year that his team discovered the first early hominin remains from the site, making Gladysvale the first new early hominin site to be discovered in South Africa since 1948. In 1993, he was appointed to the position of research officer in the Paleo-Anthropology Research Unit (PARU) (now the Evolutionary Sciences Institute; ESI) at Wits.

== Research career ==
He became a postdoctoral research fellow and research officer at the University of the Witwatersrand in 1995. He has been the leader of the Palaeoanthropology Research Group and has taken charge of fossil hominin excavations, including Sterkfontein, Swartkrans, and Gladysvale. In 2004, he was promoted to Reader in Human Evolution and the Public Understanding of Science. He is presently a research professor in the same topic at the Evolutionary Studies Institute (ESI) and the Centre of Excellence in Palaeosciences (CoE Pal) at Wits.

== Research and other activities ==
=== Organizational offices ===
Berger served as Executive Officer of the Palaeo-Anthropological Scientific Trust (PAST) (now the Palaeontological Scientific Trust; PAST) from 1994 to 2001. Berger served on the committee for successful application for World Heritage Site Status for the UNESCO Sterkfontein, Swartkans, Kromdraai, and Environs site. He also served on the Makapansgat site development committee, as well as the committee for both Makapansgat and Taung's application for World Heritage site status. He was also a founding Trustee of the Jane Goodall Trust South Africa.

Berger served with the Royal Society of South Africa, Northern Branch, between 1996 and 1998, and served as Secretary in 1996 and 1997. He also served on the Fulbright Commission, South Africa, chairing it in 2005, and chairing its Program Review Committee from 2002 to 2004.

Berger is a Fellow of the Royal Society of South Africa and serves on the Senior Advisory Board of the Global Young Academy. In 1997 he was appointed to an adjunct professorial position in the Department of Biological Anthropology and Anatomy at Duke University in Durham North Carolina and the following year as an honorary assistant professor in the Department of Anthropology at the University of Arkansas.

=== Specific study results ===
==== Palau fossils ====
Berger was lead author of a controversial report of the discovery in 2006 of what he and colleagues claimed were small-bodied humans in Palau, Micronesia. Scholars have disputed the argument that these individuals are pygmoid in stature, or that they were the result of insular dwarfism; in an article titled "Small Scattered Fragments Do Not a Dwarf Make", anthropologists Scott M. Fitzpatrick (NC State), Greg C. Nelson (University of Oregon), and Geoffrey Clark (Australian National University) conclude that "[p]rehistoric Palauan populations were normal-sized and exhibit traits that fall within the normal variation for Homo sapiens," hence, concluding that their evidence did "not support the claims by Berger et al. (2008) that there were smaller-bodied populations living in Palau or that insular dwarfism took place" Berger and co-authors Churchill and De Klerk replied to the study, saying "the logical flaws and misrepresentations in Fitzpatrick and coworker's paper are too numerous to discuss in detail" and that their restudy report "amounts to a vacuous argument from authority... and ad hominem assault, and brings little new data to bear on the question of body size and skeletal morphology in early Palauans". John Hawks, the paleoanthropologist who edited the original Palau article for PLoS ONE, has replied in part to some of the dissenting researchers' claims (in his personal web blog).

==== Discovery of Australopithecus sediba ====
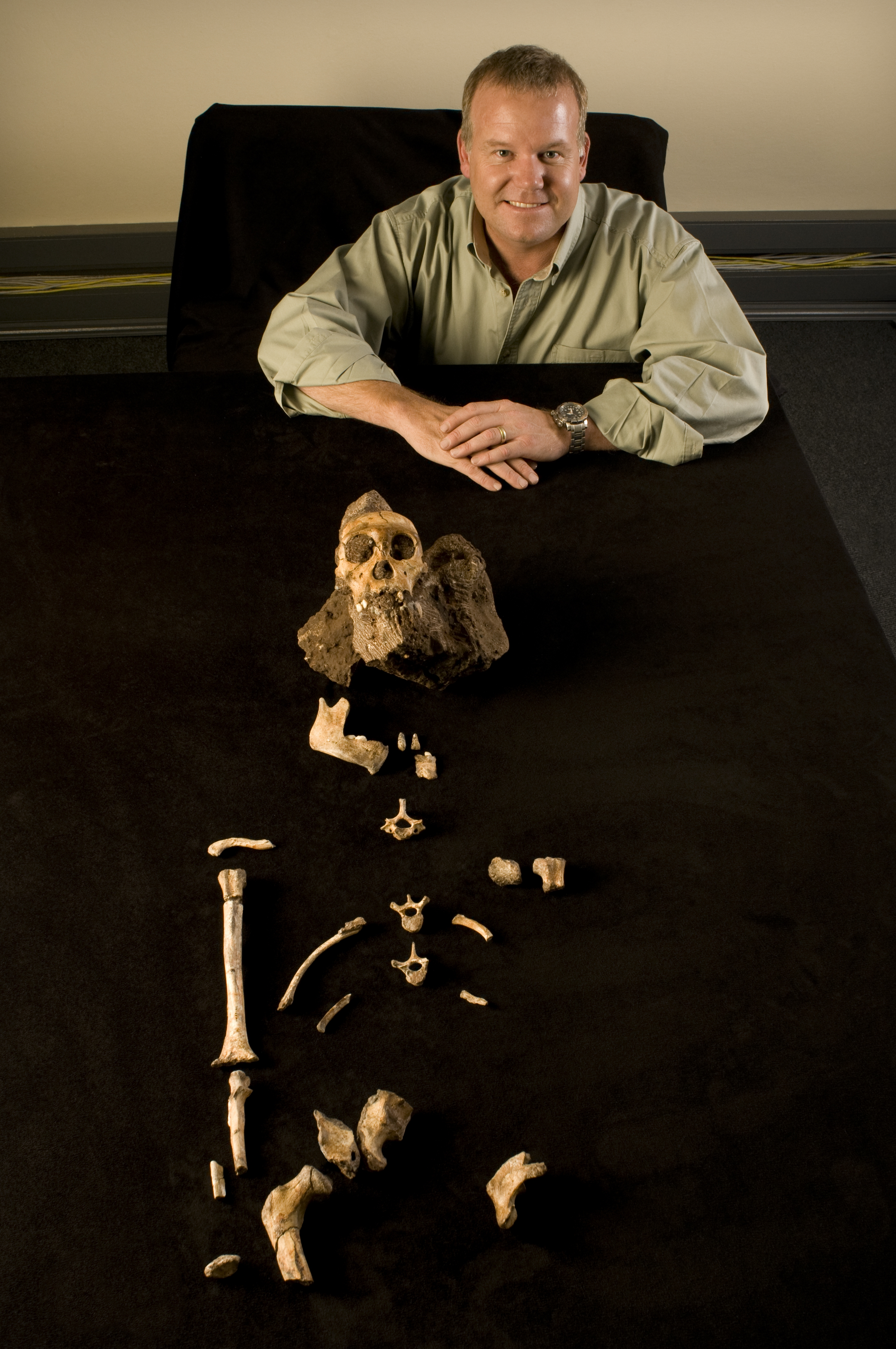
Berger displays the fossilized bones of Australopithecus sediba he discovered at the Malapa Fossil Site

In August 2008, Berger's 9-year-old son Matthew found a clavicle and a jawbone embedded in a rock near Malapa Cave in South Africa. Subsequent excavation, headed by Berger, led to the discovery of numerous bones nearby that dated back nearly two million years. Along with various co-authors, Berger published a series of articles between 2010 and 2013 in the journal Science that describe what they call a new species, Australopithecus sediba, which had a mixture of primitive and modern characteristics. The finding was particularly promising because it potentially revealed a previously unknown transitional species between the more ape-like australopithecines and the more human-like Homo habilis. Berger claimed that this new finding represented "the most probable ancestor" of modern-day Homo sapiens.

His work at the Malapa site was significant not only because of the discovery itself, but also because of the way he and his collaborators shared information about their findings. While most paleoanthropological investigations are known for a high level of secrecy, he worked to make the sediba site an open access project. In addition to sharing digital data, he made the fossils found available on request to researchers wanting to study them themselves.

==== Discovery of Homo naledi ====
On September 13, 2013, two recreational cavers, Rick Hunter and Steven Tucker, discovered a previously unknown, remote chamber within the well known Rising Star cave system. Discovering the floor of this chamber (now known as the Dinaledi Chamber or UW-101) littered with human-like bones, the pair reported their finds to a colleague, who in turn brought them to the attention of Berger. Recognizing their importance, and unable to access the chamber himself due to his size, Berger organized an expedition over social media that brought six qualified researchers in from around the world to commence an excavation of the remains in November 2013. An early career workshop was organized in May 2014 that brought together 54 local and international scientists to describe and study the more than 1,550 fossils recovered. In September 2015, the team announced Homo naledi as a new hominin species, citing its unique mosaic of more ancestral and human-like traits. Other fossil bearing localities in the system were given the site numbers 102 to 104, though research regarding them has not yet been published.

On June 4, 2023, an article discussing the Dinaledi subchamber excavations and definitively citing "rock engravings made by Homo naledi…" was uploaded to the open-access preprint repository bioRxiv, with Berger cited as lead author. The next day, he publicly announced new findings and two further publications regarding the excavations, during a memorial conference hosted by Stony Brook University in honor of Kenyan paleoanthropologist Richard Leakey, who died in January 2022. Berger stated that he and his colleagues had established the existence of intentional burials, the controlled use of fire, and the carving of primitive rock art by Homo naledi in the subchamber. The two papers were made available on bioRxiv later that day. Over the next few weeks, Berger appeared on numerous talk show interviews, podcasts, YouTube channels, and other popular media formats, again stating conclusively that the Homo naledi had engaged in the aforementioned behaviors, despite no peer-reviewed evidence having been made public yet. He also discussed his team's decision to publish in the controversial open-access journal eLife, which announced in late 2022 that it would no longer engage in traditional accept/reject peer review starting in 2023, instead pursuing its own "public review", in which articles are accepted after an initial and unspecified "eLife assessment", all peer reviews are publicly accessible on the main article page, and all articles are published as "versions of record" regardless of the actual input from reviewers. All three papers were made available on eLife as "reviewed preprints" on July 11, 2023. 8 reviewers provided a total of 11 reviews on the three papers, all of which were severely critical. The reviews noted myriad issues such as extensive lack of relevant citation and evidence, misleading and prematurely conclusive language, and a widespread pattern of trying to prove a preconceived hypothesis (e.g. intentional burials as opposed to natural deposition) rather than following objective scientific process, with one reviewer describing the paper as "storytelling for a popular news article instead of a scientific paper", and another describing the overall perspective as "HARKing". The reviews concluded that there was virtually no evidence to support the papers' narrative speculations about the observations in the cave to the exclusion of natural formation processes, and recommended against publication in the articles' current state without extensive revision and supplementary evidence. Berger et al. published a single response to all 11 reviews, visible on all three reviewed preprints alongside the peer reviews, briefly noting some of the received criticisms but ignoring others, and not specifying what (if any) revisions would be made to the papers, as is typical in the peer review and revision process.

During both the events of 2023 and the first public announcements of Dinaledi excavation findings in 2013, Berger has been widely criticized for rushing through the normal scientific review process and pursuing media blitz rather than responsible and skeptical public science communication. Six days after the initial 2023 publications in eLife, a documentary about Berger and the Rising Star excavation entitled Unknown: Cave of Bones was released for streaming on Netflix. On August 8, 2023, Penguin Random House published an autobiographical account about the excavations, written by Berger and University of Wisconsin anthropologist John Hawks.

In October 2023, Berger received extensive criticism from other scientists for taking specimens of A. sediba and H. naledi into space aboard a Virgin Galactic craft, which was described as reckless, particularly as the specimen of A. sediba was part of the type specimen.

== Awards ==
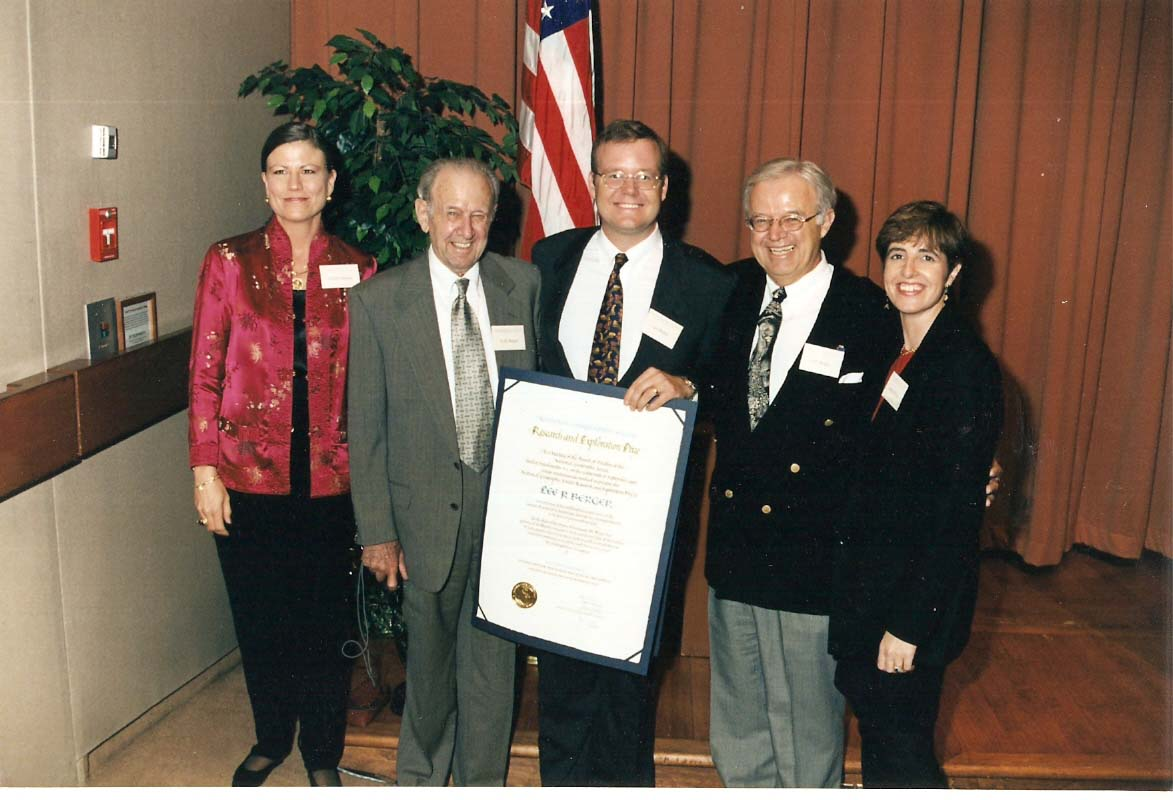
Lee Berger receiving the 1st National Geographic Prize for Research and Exploration in Washington, D.C. in 1997. He is flanked by family members. Pictured Left to Right: Vernita Berger (mother in law), Arthur B. Berger (grandfather), Lee Berger, Arthur L. Berger (father), Jacqueline Berger (wife)

Collaborative research papers by Berger have been recognized four times as being among the top 100 Science stories of the year by Discover Magazine, an international periodical focusing on popular scientific issues. The first recognition came in 1995 for his co-authored work with Ron Clarke of Wits on the taphonomy of the Taung site and in 1998 for his co-authored work with Henry McHenry of the University of California, Davis on limb lengths in Australopithecus africanus.

He is a National Press Photographers Association Humanitarian Award winner in 1987 for throwing his camera down while working as a news photographer for television station WTOC and jumping into the Savannah River to save a drowning woman. He is a Golden Plate Awardee of the Academy of Achievement. In 1997, the National Geographic Society in Washington, D.C. awarded him the first National Geographic Society Prize for Research and Exploration given for his research into human evolution. In April 2016, Berger was selected by Time as one of its "100 most influential people".

In 2023 he received the Friend of Darwin award from the National Center for Science Education (NCSE) according to the executive director Ann Reid for having "tirelessly promoted the cause of evolution education".

== Personal life ==
Berger has resided in South Africa since 1989. His wife Jacqueline is a radiologist in the medical school at the University of the Witwatersrand, the same university where he works. They have a son, Matthew, and a daughter.

== Selected publications ==
Over one hundred scientific and popular articles including several books:

=== Articles ===
- Berger, Lee R.; et al. (2015). "Homo naledi, a new species of the genus Homo from the Dinaledi Chamber, South Africa". eLife. 4 e09560. Bibcode:2015eLife...409560B. doi:10.7554/eLife.09560. PMC 4559886. PMID 26354291.
- Berger, L. R.; de Ruiter, D. J.; Churchill, S. E.; Schmid, P.; Carlson, K. J.; Dirks, P. H. G. M.; Kibii, J. M. (2010). "Australopithecus sediba: a new species of Homo-like australopith from South Africa". Science. 328 (5975): 195–204. Bibcode:2010Sci...328..195B. CiteSeerX 10.1.1.729.7802. doi:10.1126/science.1184944. PMID 20378811. S2CID 14209370.

=== Books ===
- Redrawing the family tree? (National Geographic Press, 1998)
- Visions of the Past (Vision. End. Wild. Trust, 1999)
- Towards Gondwana Alive: promoting biodiversity and stemming the sixth extinction (Gondwana Alive Soc. Press, 1999)
- In The Footsteps of Eve (with Brett Hilton-Barber) (National Geographic, 2001)
- The Official Field Guide to the Cradle of Humankind, with Brett Hilton-Barber (Struik, 2002). For a review, visit
- Change Starts in Africa (in South Africa the Good News) (S.A. Good News Publishing, 2002)
- Working and Guiding in the Cradle of Humankind (Prime Origins Publishing and The South African National Lottery, 2005)
- Berger, Lee; Hilton-Barber, Brett (2002). The Official Field Guide to the Cradle of Humankind: Sterkfontein, Swartkrans, Kromdraai and Environs World Heritage Site. Cape Town: Struik Publishers. ISBN 978-1-86872-739-1.
- The Concise Guide to Kruger (Struik, 2007)
- Berger, Lee; Aronson, Marc Aronson (2012). The Skull in the Rock: How a Scientist, a Boy, and Google Earth Opened a New Window on Human Origins. National Geographic Society. ISBN 978-1-4263-1053-9.
- Berger, Lee; Hawks, John (2017). Almost Human: The Astonishing Tale of Homo naledi and the Discovery That Changed Our Human Story. Washington: National Geographic Society. ISBN 978-1-4262-1811-8.
- Berger, Lee. Cave of Bones: A True Story of Discovery, Adventure, and Human Origins. Washington: National Geographic Society. ISBN 978-1-4262-2388-4.

== See also ==
- Dawn of Humanity (2015 PBS film)
- Footprints of Eve
