= John D. Hawks =

American paleoanthropologist

- Born: United States
- Education: Kansas State University; University of Michigan
- Known for: Paleoanthropology
- Scientific career
- Fields: Anthropology
- Workplaces: University of Wisconsin–Madison
- Thesis: The Evolution of Human Population Size: A Synthesis of Paleontological, Archaeological, and Genetic Data.
- Doctoral advisor: Milford Wolpoff
- Website: johnhawks.net

John Hawks is a professor of anthropology at the University of Wisconsin–Madison.He is the co-author of two books, Almost Human in 2017 and Cave of Bones in 2023 both co-authored with Lee Berger. He also maintains a paleoanthropology blog.

== Biography ==
Hawks graduated from Kansas State University in 1994 with degrees in French, English, and Anthropology. He received both his M.A. and Ph.D. in Anthropology from the University of Michigan where he studied under Milford Wolpoff. His doctoral thesis was titled, "The Evolution of Human Population Size: A Synthesis of Paleontological, Archaeological, and Genetic Data." After working as a postdoctoral fellow at the University of Utah, he moved to the University of Wisconsin–Madison, where he is currently a member of the Anthropology department, teaching courses including Human Evolution, Biological Anthropology, and Hominid Paleoecology. In 2014, Hawks launched an online course on Coursera under the University of Wisconsin–Madison banner, on "Human Evolution: Past and Future".

== Areas of interest ==
Hawks believes that human evolution has actually sped up in recent history in contrast to the common assumption that biological evolution has been made insignificant by cultural evolution. He covers recent developments on this topic at his blog.

Hawks has predicted introgression including the Neanderthal admixture hypothesis which gained further evidence by the Neanderthal genome project in May 2010.

Hawks believes that contemporary human mitochondrial genetics, including lack of any human mitochondrial DNA haplogroups from Eurasian archaic Homo sapiens may be in part due to natural selection of mtDNA on metabolic or other factors, rather than simple total replacement and genetic drift.

Hawks has also discussed the cladistic classification of the Hominidae and has criticized the proliferation of terms like hominin.

== Blog ==
Hawks' blog is a widely read and referenced science blog as measured by Technorati's ranking.

It deals primarily with paleoanthropology and provides analysis of current research within the discipline, discussing the significance and implications of fossils related to human evolution, genetics and genomics of hominid populations (alive and extinct), archaeological topics, as well as general commentary and review of both scientific and popular literature.

Hawks has also written extensively about the experience of blogging about one's field while working in academia.

== Books ==
- Almost Human. Co-authored with Lee Berger. National Geographic Books. 2017.
- Cave of Bones. Co-authored with Lee Berger. National Geographic Books. 2023.

== See also ==
- Through the Wormhole#Season 3 (2012)
- Dawn of Humanity (2015 PBS film)
- First Peoples (2015 PBS series)
- Homo naledi
