= First Peoples (TV program) =

2015 American TV documentary

First Peoples is a five-part PBS television documentary program about the first people on the Earth. The program aired in 2015. It shows how humans reached each continent, focusing on various fossil discoveries and placing them into the context of what research has discovered about pre-modern human migration. The program includes interviews with many of the researchers involved in these studies, such as geneticists Svante Pääbo and Eske Willerslev and anthropologists John D. Hawks and Nicole Waguespack.

== Episodes ==
1. "First Peoples: Americas" The episode begins with a lengthy discussion on Kennewick Man and what his DNA reveals about him.
2. "First Peoples: Africa" This episode discusses the Jebel Irhoud skull found in Morocco. It also discusses evidence of other humans in West and Central Africa.
3. "First Peoples: Asia" It emphasized man's need to explore. Because of that need they encountered other peoples. Modern human DNA shows the earliest Homo sapiens interbred with other human species such as Neanderthals.
4. "First Peoples: Australia" This program explores the close connections between the first people and modern-day Australian Aborigines.
5. "First Peoples: Europe" It highlights the explosion of art in Europe that came with the Homo sapiens.
