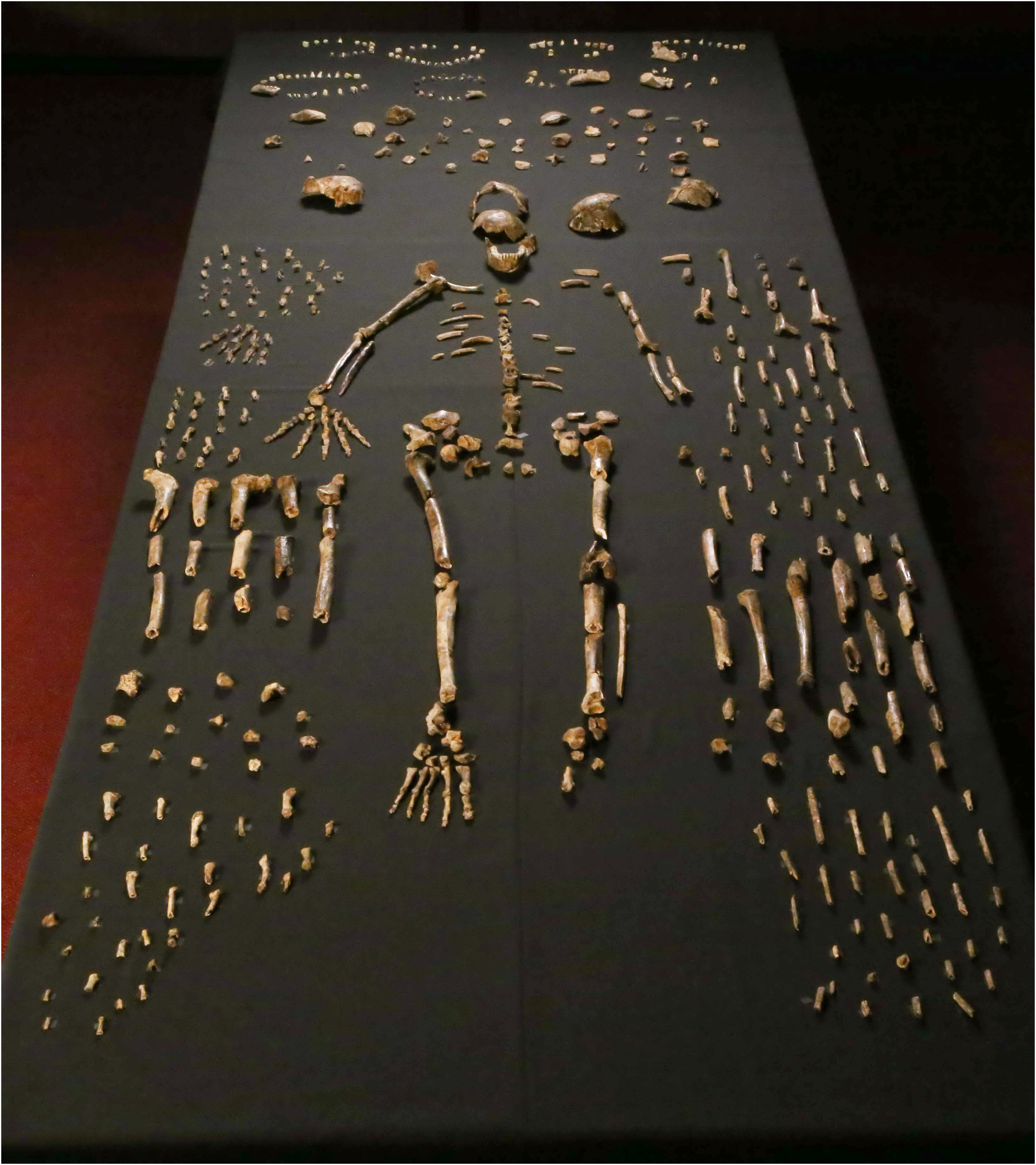
- The 737 known elements of H. naledi

Scientific classification
- Kingdom: Animalia
- Phylum: Chordata
- Class: Mammalia
- Order: Primates
- Superfamily: Hominoidea
- Family: Hominidae
- Genus: Homo
- Species: †H. naledi

Binomial name
- †Homo naledi Berger et al., 2015
- Rising Star Cave (South Africa) Rising Star Cave (Greater Johannesburg)

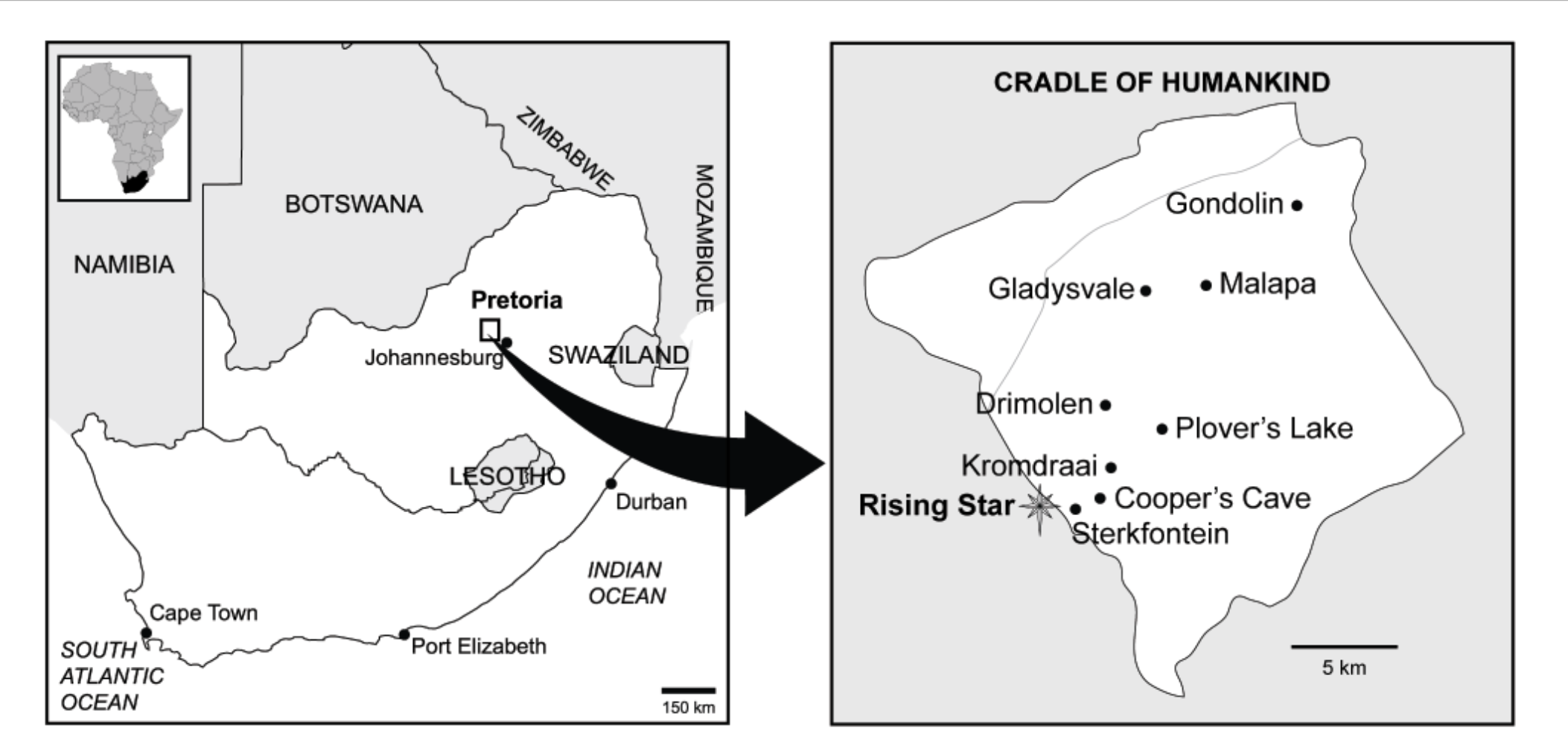
- Location of Rising Star Cave in Cradle of Humankind, South Africa.

= Homo naledi =

Homo naledi Temporal range: Middle Pleistocene 0.335–0.236 Ma

South African archaic human species

Homo naledi is an extinct species of archaic human discovered in 2013 in the Rising Star Cave system, Gauteng province, South Africa, part of the Cradle of Humankind, dating back to the Middle Pleistocene 335,000–236,000 years ago. The excavation comprises 1,550 specimens of bone, representing 737 different skeletal elements, and at least 15 different individuals. Despite this exceptionally high number of specimens, their classification with other Homo species remains unclear.

Along with similarities to contemporary Homo, they share several characteristics with the ancestral Australopithecus as well as early Homo (mosaic evolution), most notably a small cranial capacity of 465–610 cm^{3} (28.4–37.2 cu in), compared with 1,270–1,330 cm^{3} (78–81 cu in) in modern humans. They are estimated to have averaged 143.6 cm (4 ft 9 in) in height and 39.7 kg (88 lb) in weight, yielding a small relative brain size, encephalization quotient, of 4.5. H. naledi brain anatomy seems to have been similar to contemporary Homo, which could indicate comparable cognitive complexity. The persistence of small-brained humans for so long in the midst of bigger-brained contemporaries revises the previous conception that a larger brain would necessarily lead to an evolutionary advantage, and their mosaic anatomy greatly expands the known range of variation for the genus.

H. naledi anatomy indicates that, although they were capable of long-distance travel with a humanlike stride and gait, they were more arboreal than other Homo, better adapted to climbing and suspensory behaviour in trees than endurance running. Tooth anatomy suggests consumption of gritty foods covered in particulates such as dust or dirt, suggesting a diet of nuts and tubers.

Although they have not been associated with stone tools or any indication of material culture, they appear to have been dexterous enough to produce and handle tools. Therefore, they may have manufactured Early or Middle Stone Age industries found in excavations near their fossils, since no other human species in the vicinity at that time has been discovered. It has also been controversially postulated that these individuals were buried deliberately by being carried into and placed in the chamber. Some researchers suggest that H. naledi also may have carved crosshatched rock signs in a passage to what could be a burial chamber, but many paleontologists question this hypothesis.

== Discovery ==
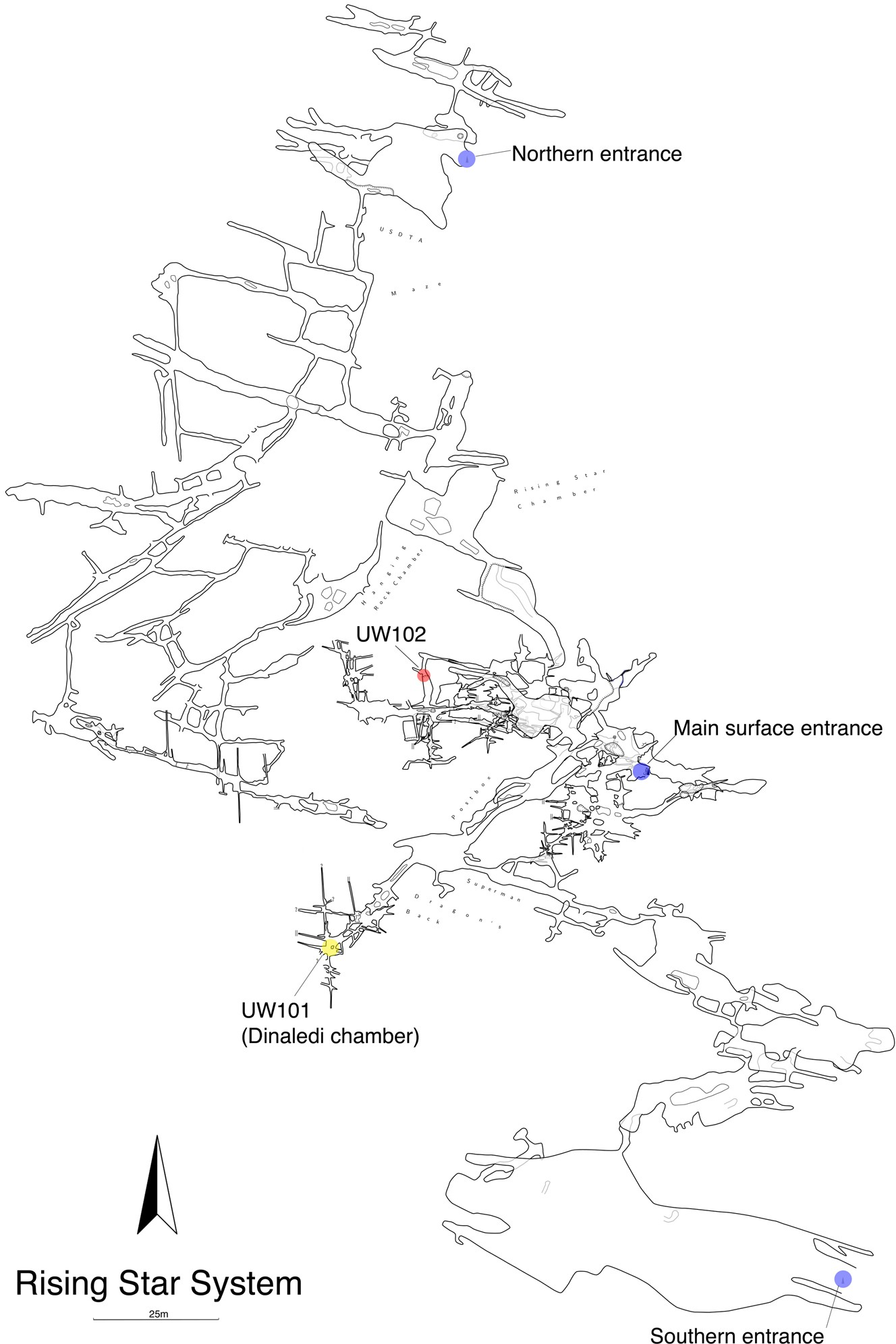
A map of the Rising Star Cave, marking the Dinaledi Chamber in yellow and the Lesedi Chamber in red

On 13 September 2013 while exploring the Rising Star Cave system in the Cradle of Humankind, South Africa, cavers Rick Hunter and Steven Tucker found hominin fossils at the bottom of the Dinaledi Chamber. On 24 September, they returned to the chamber and took photographs that they showed to South African palaeoanthropologists Pedro Boshoff and Lee Rogers Berger on 1 October. Berger assembled an excavation team that included Hunter and Tucker, and six women selected for their slender build, the so-called "Underground Astronauts".

The chamber had been entered at least once before, by cavers in the early 1990s. They rearranged some bones and may have caused further damage, although much of the floor in the chamber had not been walked on prior to 2013. The site lies about 80 m (260 ft) from the main entrance, at the bottom of a 12 m (39 ft) vertical drop, and the 10 m (33 ft) long main passage is only 25–50 cm (10 in – 1 ft 8 in) at its narrowest. In total, more than 1,550 pieces of bone belonging to at least fifteen individuals (9 immature and 6 adults) have been recovered from the clay-rich sediments. Berger and colleagues published the findings in 2015.

The fossils represent 737 anatomical elements – including portions of the skull, jaw, ribs, teeth, limbs, and inner ear bones – from old, adult, young, and infantile individuals. There are also some articulated or near-articulated elements, including the skull with the jaw bone, and nearly complete hands and feet. With the number of individuals of both genders across several age demographics, it then became the richest assemblage of associated fossil hominins discovered in Africa. Aside from the Sima de los Huesos collection and later Neanderthal and modern human samples, the excavation site has the most comprehensive representation of skeletal elements across the lifespan, and from multiple individuals, in the hominin fossil record by that time.

The holotype specimen, DH1, comprises a partial calvaria (top of the skull), partial maxilla, and nearly complete jawbone. The paratypes, DH2 through DH5, all comprise partial calvaria. Because the remains came from Rising Star Cave, in 2015, Berger and colleagues named the species Homo naledi with the specific name meaning "star" in the Sotho language.

The remains of at least three additional individuals (two adults and a child) were reported in the Lesedi Chamber of the cave by John Hawks and colleagues in 2017. In 2026, proteomic analysis of tooth enamel found no evidence of male markers in the studied sample representing at least 20 individuals.

== Classification ==
In 2017, the Dinaledi remains were dated to 335,000–236,000 years ago in the Middle Pleistocene, using electron spin resonance (ESR) and uranium–thorium (U-Th) dating on three teeth, and U-Th and paleomagnetic dating of the sediments they were deposited in. Previously, the fossils were thought to have dated to 1–2 million years ago, because no similarly small-brained hominins had been known from such a recent date in Africa. The smaller-brained Homo floresiensis of Indonesia lived on an isolated island and, apparently, became extinct shortly after the arrival of modern humans.

The ability of such a small-brained hominin to have survived for so long in the midst of bigger-brained Homo has greatly revised previous conceptions of human evolution and the notion that a larger brain would necessarily lead to an evolutionary advantage. Their mosaic anatomy also greatly expands the range of variation for the genus.

H. naledi is hypothesised to have branched off very early from contemporaneous Homo. It is unclear whether they branched off at approximately the time of H. habilis, H. rudolfensis, and A. sediba, are a sister taxon to H. erectus and the contemporaneous large-brained Homo, or are a sister taxon to the descendants of H. heidelbergensis (modern humans and Neanderthals). This places the branching from contemporary Homo in a range of time from as early as the Pliocene to 900,000 years ago at the latest. It is also possible that their ancestors speciated after an interbreeding event between Homo and late australopithecines. Comparison of skull features reveals that H. naledi has the closest affinities to H. erectus.

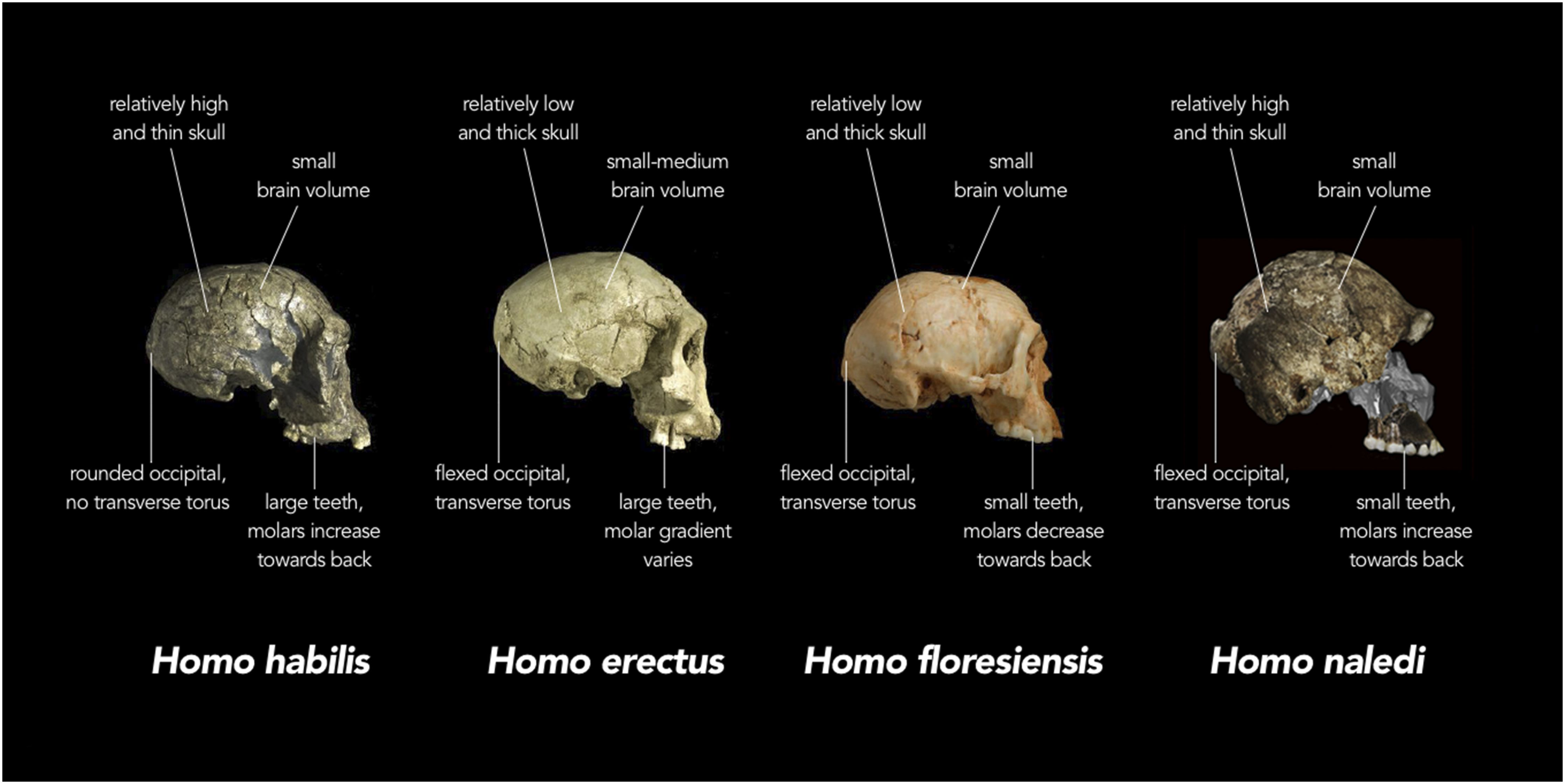
A comparison of skull features of H. naledi with other small-brained Homo: H. habilis, H. erectus georgicus, and H. floresiensis

It is unclear whether these H. naledi were an isolated population in the Cradle of Humankind, or were ranged across Africa. If the latter, then several gracile hominin fossils from African sites that traditionally have been classified as late H. erectus might instead represent H. naledi specimens.

Although earlier study placed H. naledi as a late offshoot from H. erectus in the phylogenetic tree, the recent study places H. naledi as an early offshoot from H. erectus in the phylogenetic tree.

== Anatomy ==
=== Skull ===
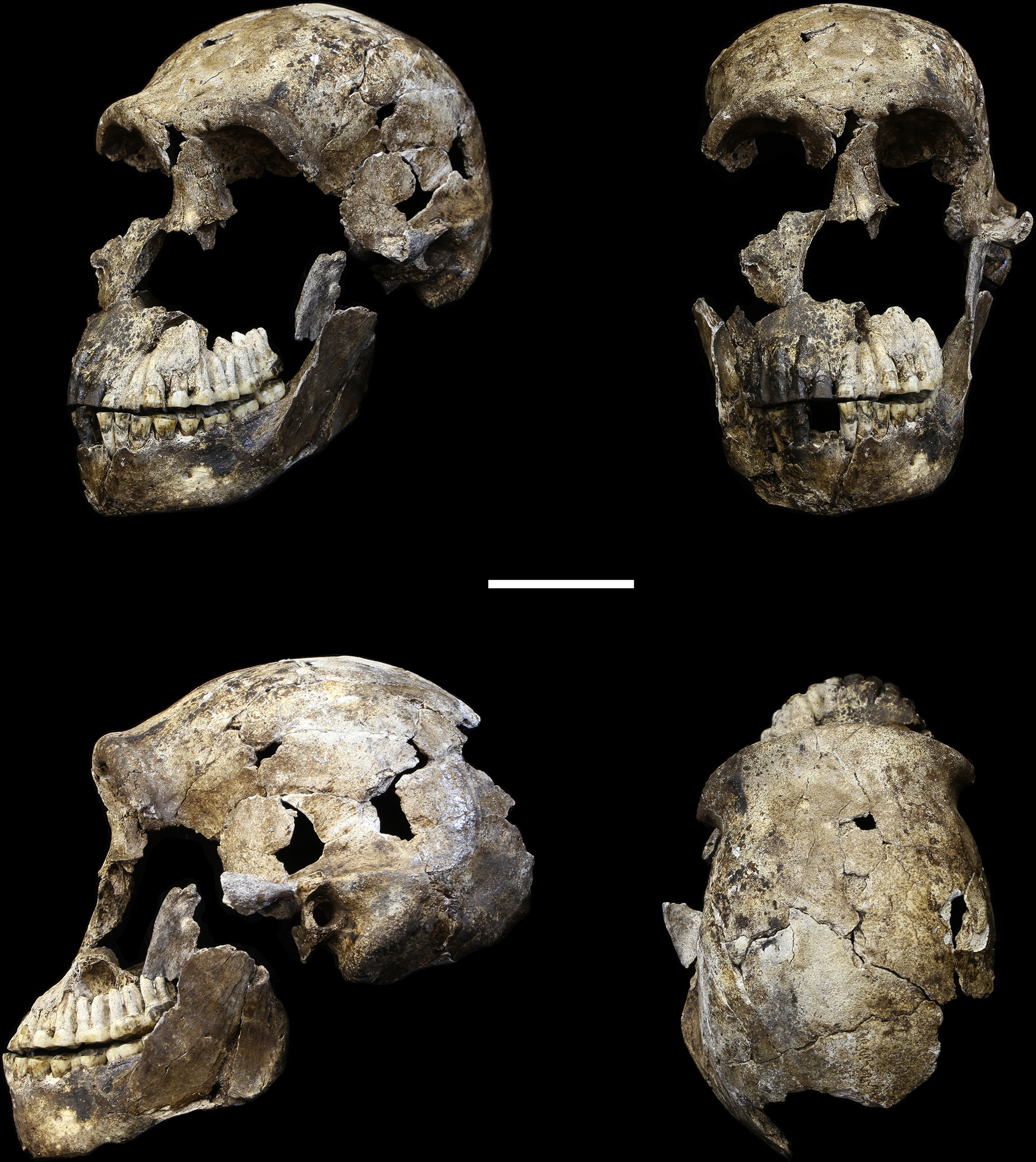
Different views of LES1

Two H. naledi skulls from the Dinaledi chamber had cranial volumes of approximately 560 cm^{3} (34 cu in), and two female skulls 465 cm^{3} (28.4 cu in). A H. naledi skull from the Lesedi chamber had a cranial volume of 610 cm^{3} (37 cu in). The Dinaledi specimens are more similar to the cranial capacity of australopithecines. For comparison, H. erectus averaged approximately 900 cm^{3} (55 cu in), and modern humans 1,270 and 1,130 cm^{3} (78 and 69 cu in) for males and females respectively. The Lesedi specimen is more within the range of H. habilis and H. e. georgicus. The encephalization quotient of H. naledi was estimated at 3.75, which is the same as the pygmy H. floresiensis, but notably smaller than all other Homo. Contemporary Homo were all above 6, H. e. georgicus at 3.55, and A. africanus at 3.81. It is unclear whether H. naledi inherited small brain size from the last common Homo ancestor, or whether it was evolved secondarily and more recently.

The skull morphology is more similar to Homo, with a slenderer shape, the asymmetry in both the temporal and occipital lobes of the brain, and reduced post-orbital constriction, with the skull not becoming narrower behind the eye-sockets. The frontal lobe morphology is more or less the same in all Homo brains despite size, and differs from Australopithecus, a characteristic that has been implicated in the production of tools, the development of language, and sociality.

Similarly to modern humans (but not to fossil hominins, including South African australopithecines, H. erectus, and Neanderthals) the permanent second molar of H. naledi erupted comparatively late in life, emerging alongside the premolars instead of before, a characteristic that indicates a slower maturation unusually comparable to modern humans. The tooth formation rate of the front teeth is also most similar to modern humans. The overall size and shape of the molars most closely resemble those of three unidentified Homo specimens from the local Swartkrans and East African Koobi Fora Caves, and are similar in size (but not shape) to Pleistocene H. sapiens. The necks of the molars are proportionally similar to those of A. afarensis and Paranthropus.

Unlike modern humans and contemporary Homo, H. naledi lacks several accessory dental features, and has a high frequency of individuals who present main cusps, namely the metacone (midline on the tongue-side) and hypocone (to the right on the lip-side) on the second and third molars, and a Y-shaped hypoconulid (a ridge on the lip-side toward the cheek) on all three molars. The premolars of H. naledi are characterised by a well-developed P_{3} and P_{4} metaconid, strongly developed P_{3} mesial marginal ridge, a larger P_{3} than P_{4}, and tall crowns, distinguishing them from the premolars of other Homo species. Nonetheless, H. naledi also has many dental similarities with contemporary Homo.

The anvil (a middle ear bone) more resembles those of chimps, gorillas, and Paranthropus than Homo. Like H. habilis and H. erectus, H. naledi has a well-developed brow-ridge with a fissure stretching across just above the ridge and, like H. erectus, a pronounced occipital bun. H. naledi has some facial similarities with H. rudolfensis.

=== Build ===
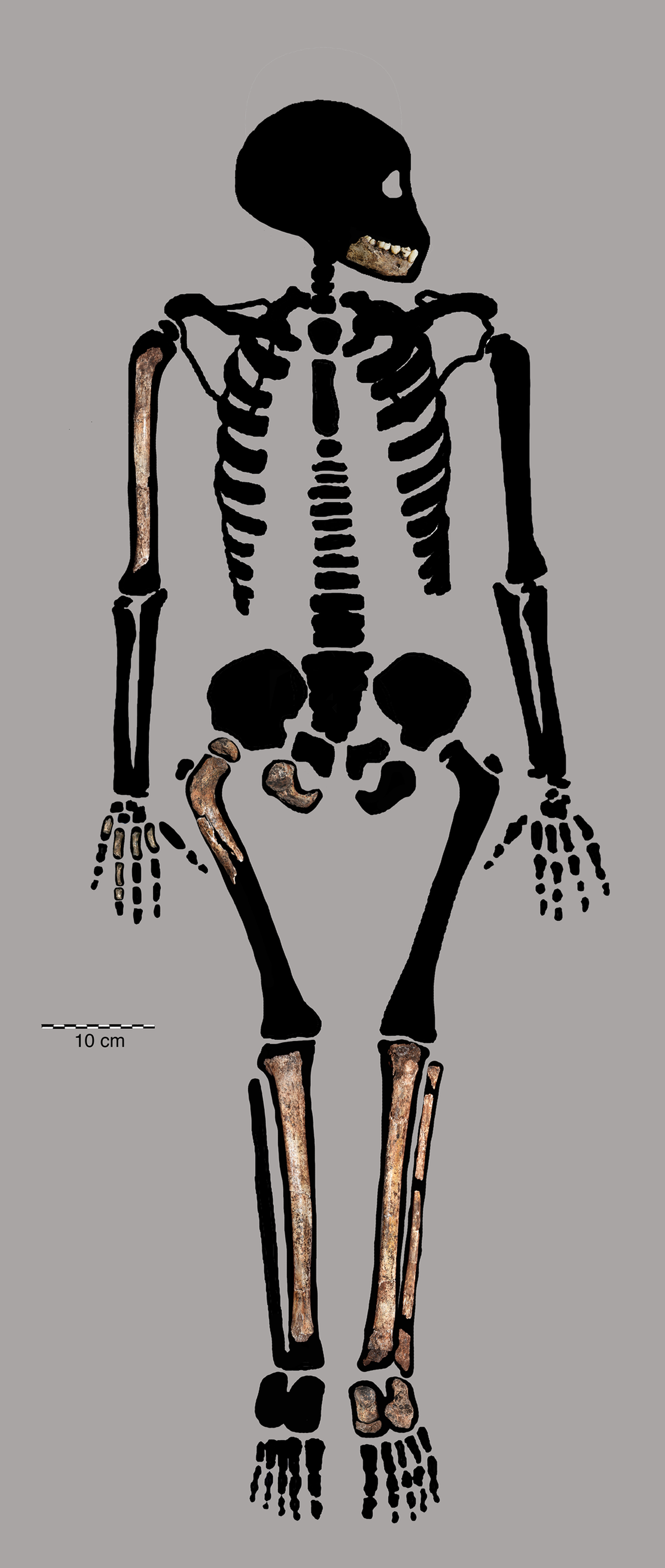
A skeletal reconstruction of the juvenile DH7 – Scale 10 cm (4 in)

The H. naledi specimens are estimated to have, on average, stood approximately 143.6 cm (4 ft 9 in) and weighed 39.7 kg (88 lb). This body mass is intermediate between what is typically seen in Australopithecus and Homo species. Like other Homo, female and male H. naledi were likely about the same size. A juvenile specimen, DH7, is skeletally consistent with a growth rate similar to the faster ape-like trajectories of MH1 (A. sediba) and Turkana boy (H. ergaster). Because dental development is so similar to that of modern humans, a slower maturation rate is not completely out of the question. Using the faster growth rate, DH7 would have died at 8–11 years old, but using the slower growth, DH7 would have died at 11–15 years old.

Concerning the spine, only the tenth and eleventh thoracic vertebrae (in the chest region) are preserved from presumably a single individual, which are proportionally similar to those of contemporary Homo, although being the smallest recorded of any hominin. The two transverse processes of the vertebra, which jut out diagonally, are most similar to those of Neanderthals. The neural canals within are proportionally large, similar to modern humans, Neanderthals, and H. e. georgicus. The eleventh rib is straight like that of A. afarensis, and the twelfth rib is robust in cross-section like that of Neanderthals. Like Neanderthals, the twelfth rib appears to have supported strong intercostal muscles above, and a strong quadratus lumborum muscle below. Unlike Neanderthals, there was weak attachment to the diaphragm. Overall, this H. naledi specimen appears to have been small-bodied compared with other Homo species, although it is unclear whether this single specimen is representative of the species.

The shoulders are more similar to those of australopithecines, with the shoulder blade situated higher on the back and farther from the midline, short clavicles, and little or no humeral torsion. Elevated shoulder and clavicle bones indicate a narrow chest. The pelvis and legs have features reminiscent of Australopithecus, including anterposteriorly compressed (from front to back) femoral necks, mediolaterally compressed (from left to right) tibiae, and a somewhat circular fibular neck; which indicate a wide abdomen. This combination would preclude efficient endurance running in H. naledi, unlike H. erectus and descendants. Instead, H. naledi appears to have been more arboreal.

=== Limbs ===
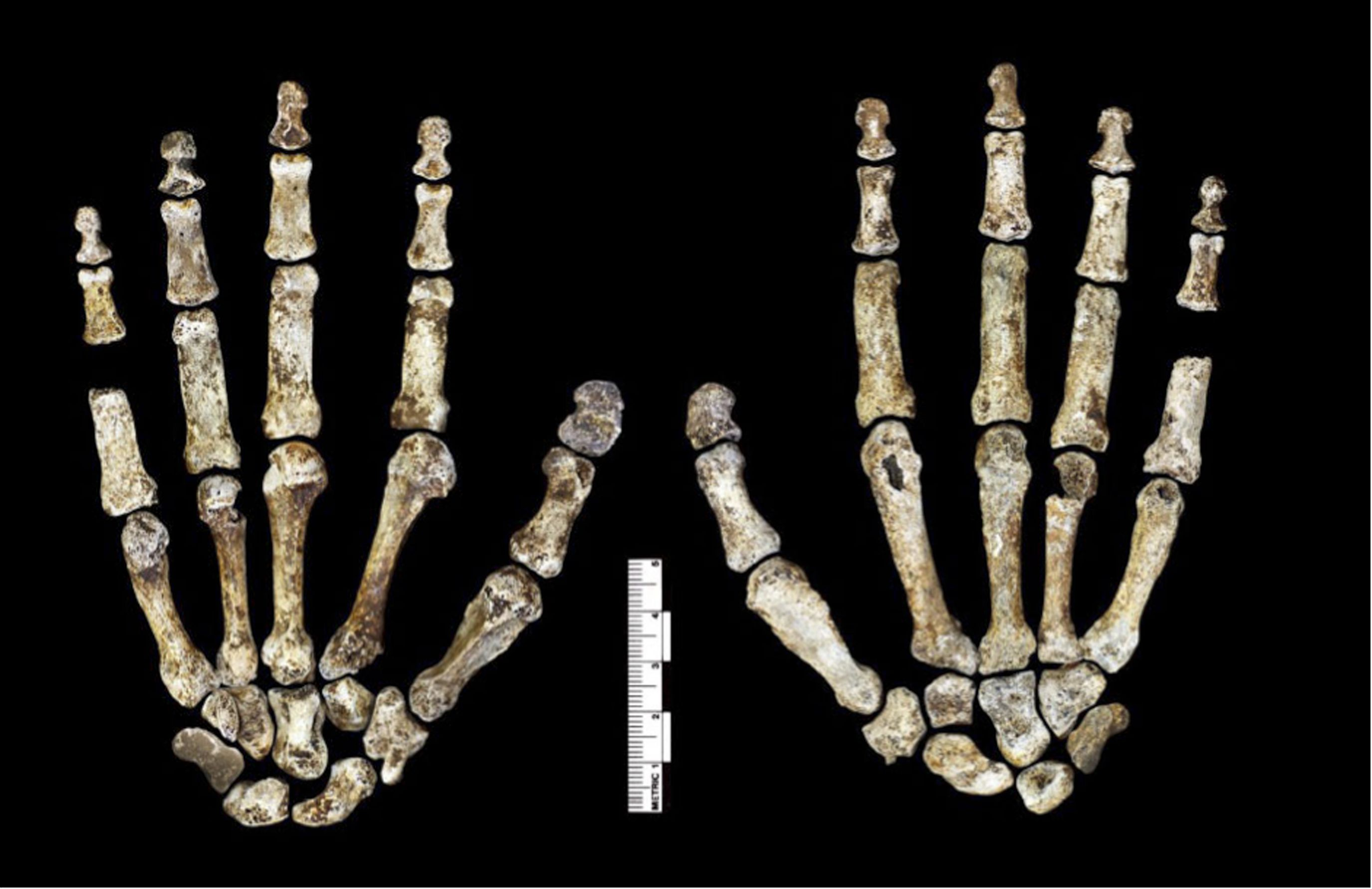
Fossil right hand of H. naledi (bottom view left, top view right) – Scale 5 cm (2 in)

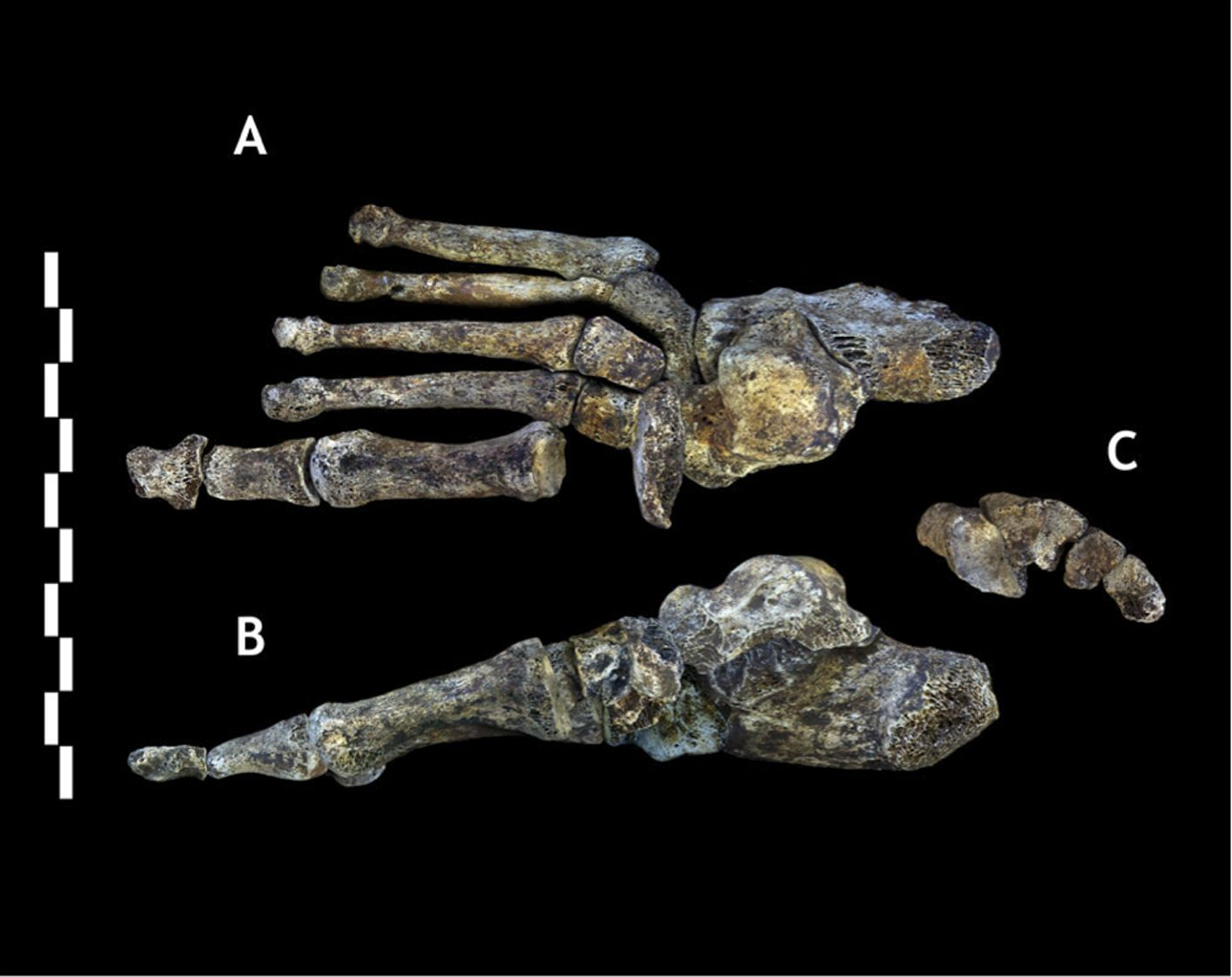
Fossil right foot of H. naledi, A) top view, B) left-side view, C) arch – Scale 10 cm (3.9 in)

The metacarpal bone of the thumb, which is used in holding and manipulating large objects, was well-developed and had strong crests to support its opponens pollicis muscle used in precision-pinch gripping, and its thenar muscles. This is more similar to other Homo than Australopithecus. H. naledi appears to have had strong flexor pollicis longus muscles like modern humans, with humanlike palm and finger pads, which are important for forceful gripping between the thumb and fingers. Unlike Homo, the H. naledi thumb metacarpal joint is comparably small, relative to the thumb's length, and the thumb phalangeal joint is flattened. The distal thumb phalanx bone is robust, and proportionally more similar to those of H. habilis and P. robustus.

The metacarpals of the other fingers share adaptations with modern humans and Neanderthals to be able to cup and manipulate objects, and the wrist joint is broadly similar to that of modern humans and Neanderthals. Conversely, the proximal phalanges are curved and are almost identical to those of A. afarensis and H. habilis, which is interpreted as an adaptation for climbing and suspensory behaviour. Such curvature is more pronounced in adults than juveniles, suggesting that adults climbed just as much or more so than juveniles, and this behaviour was common. The fingers are proportionally longer than those of any other fossil hominin, other than the arboreal Ardipithecus ramidus and a modern human specimen from Qafzeh cave, Israel, which is consistent with climbing behaviour.

H. naledi was a biped and stood upright. Like other Homo, they had strong insertion for the gluteus muscles, well-defined linea aspera (a ridge running down the back of the femur), thick patellae, long tibiae, and gracile fibulae. These indicate that they were capable of long-distance travel. The H. naledi foot was similar to that of modern humans and other Homo, with adaptations for bipedalism and a humanlike gait. The heel bone has a low orientation, comparable to those of non-human great apes, and the ankle bone has a low declination, which possibly indicate the foot would have been subtly stiffer during the stance phase of walking before the foot pushed off the ground.

== Pathology ==
The adult right mandible U.W. 101-1142 has a bony lesion, suggestive of a benign tumour. The individual would have experienced some swelling and localised discomfort, but the tumour's position near the medial pterygoid muscle (likely causing discomfort on the jaw hinge) may have impeded function of the muscle, and changed elevation of the right side of the jaw.

Dental defects in H. naledi specimens during 1.6–2.8 and 4.3–7.6 months of development were most likely caused by seasonal stressors. This may have been due to extreme summer and winter temperatures causing food scarcity. Minimum winter temperatures of the area average about 3 °C (37 °F), and can drop below freezing. Staying warm for an infant of the small-bodied H. naledi would have been difficult, and winters likely increased susceptibility to respiratory diseases. Environmental stressors are consistent with present-day flu seasons in South Africa peaking during winter, and paediatric diarrhoea hospitalisation being most frequent at the height of the rainy season in summer.

Local hominins were likely preyed upon by large carnivores, such as lions, leopards, and hyaenas. There seems to be a distinct paucity of large carnivore remains from the northern end of the Cradle of Humankind, where Rising Star Cave is located, possibly because carnivores preferred the Blaaubank River to the south that may have offered better hunting grounds with a greater abundance of large prey items. Alternatively, because many more sites are known in the south than the north, carnivore spatial patterns may not be well-represented by the fossil record (preservation bias).

== Culture ==
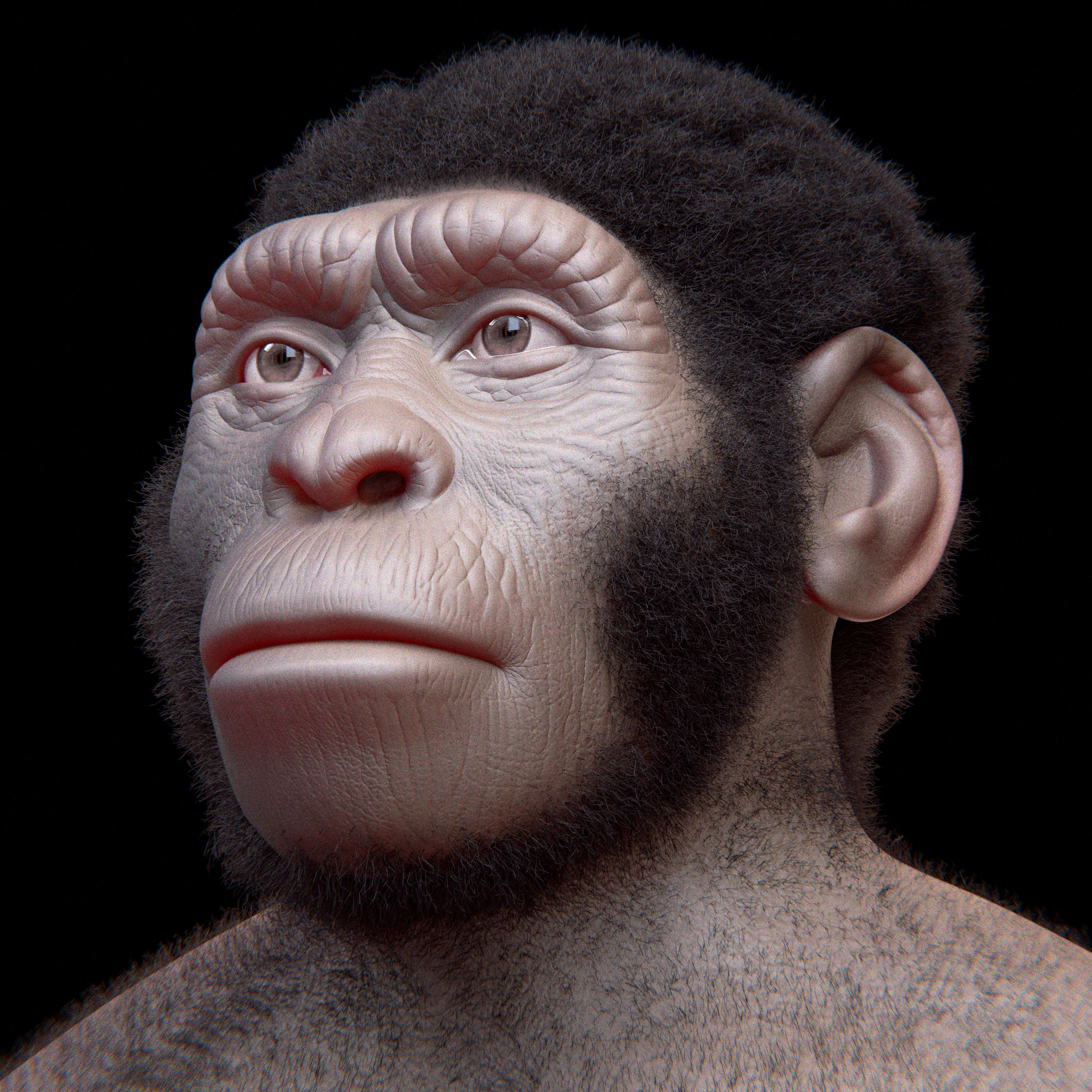
A facial reconstruction of Homo naledi

=== Food ===
Dental chipping and wearing indicates the habitual consumption of small hard objects, such as dirt and dust, and cup-shaped wearing on the back teeth may have stemmed from gritty particles. These could have originated from unwashed roots and tubers. Alternatively, aridity could have stirred up particulates onto food items, coating food in dust. It is possible that they commonly ate larger hard items, such as seeds and nuts, but these were processed into smaller pieces before consumption.

H. naledi occupied a seemingly unique ecological niche from previous South African hominins, including Australopithecus and Paranthropus. However, the teeth of all three species indicate that they needed to exert high shearing force to chew through perhaps plant or muscle fibres. The teeth of other Homo cannot produce such high forces perhaps due to the use of some food processing techniques, such as cooking.

=== Technology ===
H. naledi could have produced Early Stone Age (Acheulean and possibly the earlier Oldowan) or Middle Stone Age industries because they have the same adaptations to the hand as other human species that are implicated in tool production. H. naledi is the only identified human species to have existed during the early Middle Stone Age of the Highveld region, South Africa, possibly indicating that this species manufactured and maintained this tradition at least during this time period. In this scenario, such industries and stone cutting techniques would have evolved independently several times among different Homo species and populations, or were transported over long distances by the inventors or apprentices and taught.

=== Alleged burials ===
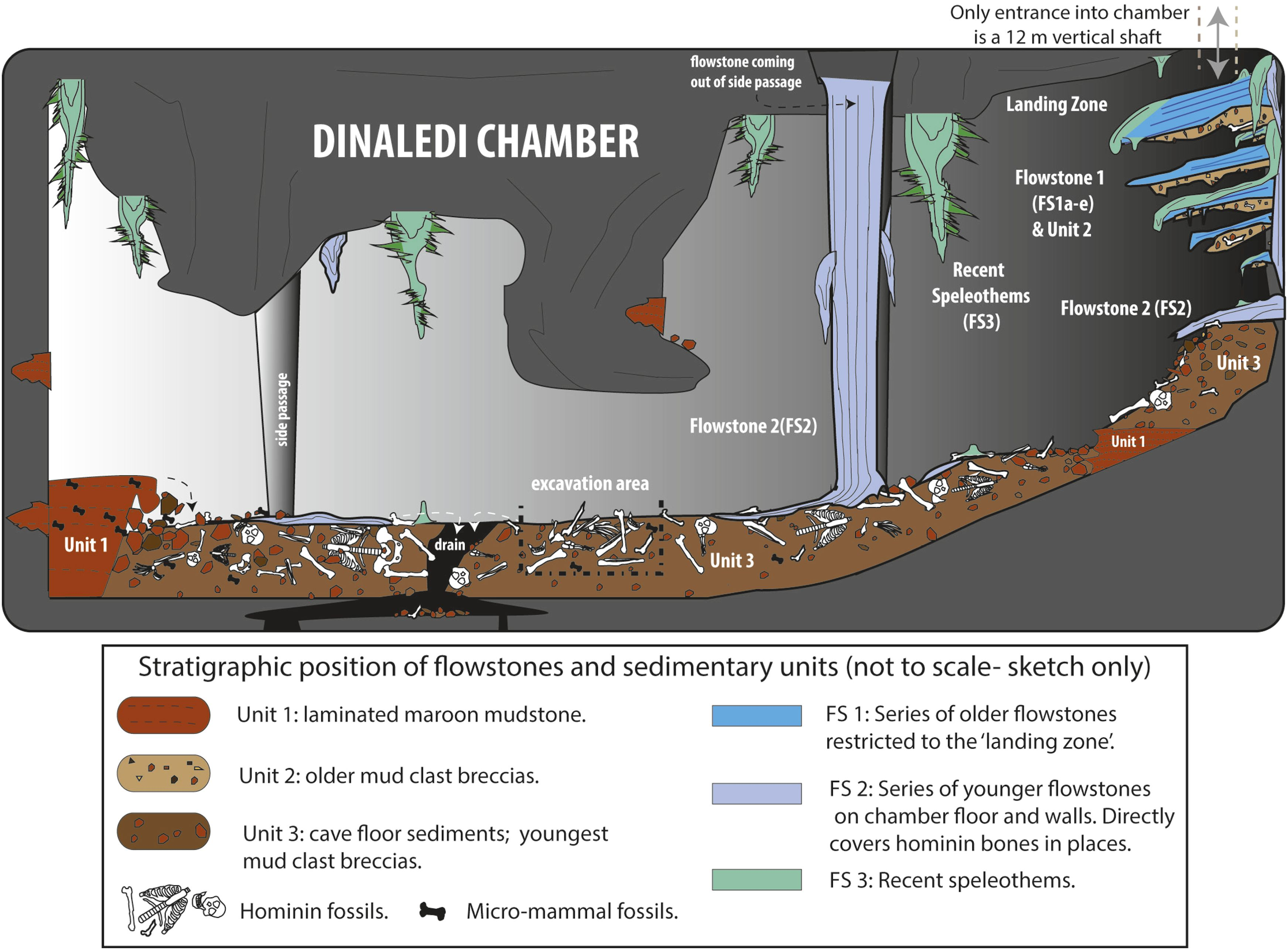
An illustration of the Dinaledi Chamber, in the Rising Star Cave

Since the first publication of results from the Dinaledi Chamber, there has been scholarly debate on whether the fossils and surrounding material excavated from the cave provide evidence of H. naledi engaging in intentional burial activity. If true, Dinaledi Chamber would be the oldest known hominin burial, beating out the c. 78,000 year old H. sapiens burial from Panga ya Saidi cave in Kenya by some 160,000 years. However, a lack of proof regarding the taphonomic, stratigraphic, and mineralogical claims made by the excavators has caused significant academic backlash.

In 2015, excavating archaeologists Paul Dirks, Lee Berger, and their colleagues concluded that the bodies had to have been deliberately carried and placed into the chamber by people because they appear to have been intact when they were first deposited in the chamber. They found no evidence of trauma from being dropped into the chamber nor evidence of predation. Furthermore, the chamber is inaccessible to large predators, appears to be an isolated system, and has never been flooded. There is no hidden shaft through which people could have accidentally fallen in, and there is no evidence of some catastrophe that killed all the individuals inside the chamber. The excavating team stated that it is possible that the bodies were dropped down a chute and fell slowly due to the narrowness and irregularity of the path down. Thus, they concluded that, since natural forces were apparently not at play, the bodies must have been deliberately buried. Since the cave is unlit, those burying them would have required artificial light to navigate the cave. The archaeologists have reported finding evidence for fire which may support this claim, yet they have not published it as of July 2024. The excavators claim that the site was used repeatedly for burials since the bodies were not all deposited at the same time.

In 2016, paleoanthropologist Aurore Val countered that discounting natural forces for depositing the bodies is unjustified. She identified evidence of damage done by beetles, beetle larvae, and snails, which facilitate decomposition. Since the chamber does not present ideal conditions for snails and does not contain snail shells, she argued that decomposition began before deposition in the chamber, potentially discounting the excavators' claims of intentional burial. Invertebrate damage to the fossils was later confirmed by a 2021 analysis of a fragmentary skull, although this analysis also concludes that it is likely that "some" hominin agency was involved in the deposition of the bone fragments.

In 2017, Dirks, Berger, and colleagues reaffirmed that there is no evidence of water flow into the cave and that it is more likely that the bodies were deliberately deposited into the chamber. They theorized that as it is possible that the H. naledi bones were deposited by contemporary Homo, such as the ancestors of modern humans, rather than other H. naledi, but that the cultural behavior of burial practices is not impossible for H. naledi. They proposed that placement in the chamber may have been done to remove decaying bodies from a settlement, prevent scavengers, or as a consequence of social bonding and grief.

In 2018, anthropologist Charles Egeland and colleagues echoed Val's arguments and stated that there is insufficient evidence to conclude that such an early hominid species had developed a concept of afterlife as often associated with burials. They said that the preservation of the Dinaledi individuals is similar to those of baboon carcasses that accumulate in larger caves, either by natural death of cave-dwelling baboons or by a leopard dragging carcasses into caves.

In July 2023, Berger and his team starred in a Netflix documentary titled Unknown: Cave of Bones. The documentary released a month after Berger et al. released three unreviewed preprints under eLife's recently created publishing model. According to Berger, these findings were intended to be published in a leading journal but were rejected, leading the research team to publish with eLife. This model allows researchers to publish articles without being subjected to peer review, in which an editor may reject the paper based on the peer reviewers' statements. eLife instead publishes papers along with publicly-available reviews. The decision to publish unreviewed papers in conjunction with a supportive documentary was negatively received as being over-eager and sensationalist by other paleontologists and archaeologists. Allegations that Berger et al. have published hasty and sensational work date back to at least 2015. The published reviews expressed generally negative sentiments. One anonymous reviewer wrote:

The work presented by the authors is imprudent and incomplete and does not meet the requirements set forth by our discipline.

These papers were subsequently updated by the authors several times between their release in 2023 and 2025. These updated drafts were reviewed—by the same reviewers—before a version of record for each paper was released. Reviewer comments on the penultimate drafts remained mixed.

In 2024, a group of paleoanthropologists published a critique of Berger et al. on their methodology, research design, and publication strategy. The authors identify oversights Berger et al. made in their sedimentological and geologic analyses.

In 2025, the paleoanthropologists Kimberly K. Foecke, Alain Queffelec and Robyn Pickering found the data analysis of "Evidence for deliberate burial of the dead by Homo naledi" to be "heavily influenced by a presupposed narrative" and published a paper to criticize the preprint's faulty statistical methods. A primary concern is that Berger's original geochemical soil analyses purported to show a difference between the soil directly surrounding the fossils and further away as evidence that the ground had been dug up, presumably to bury the bodies. Foecke, Queffelec & Pickering (2025) reanalyzed the data in the pre-prints regarding the soil and were unable to replicate Berger's findings, thus undermining a key piece of evidence in the burial hypothesis.

== Gallery ==
Skeletal elements
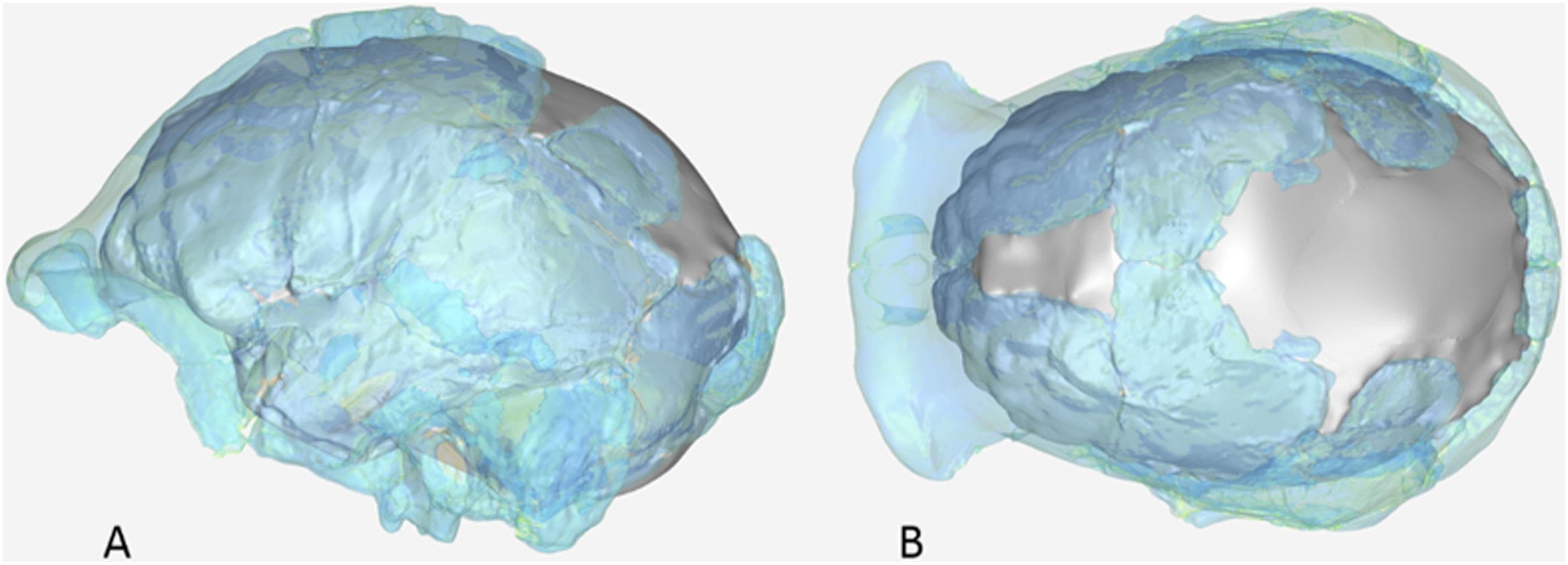
(A,B) Digitally reconstructed
skull sides

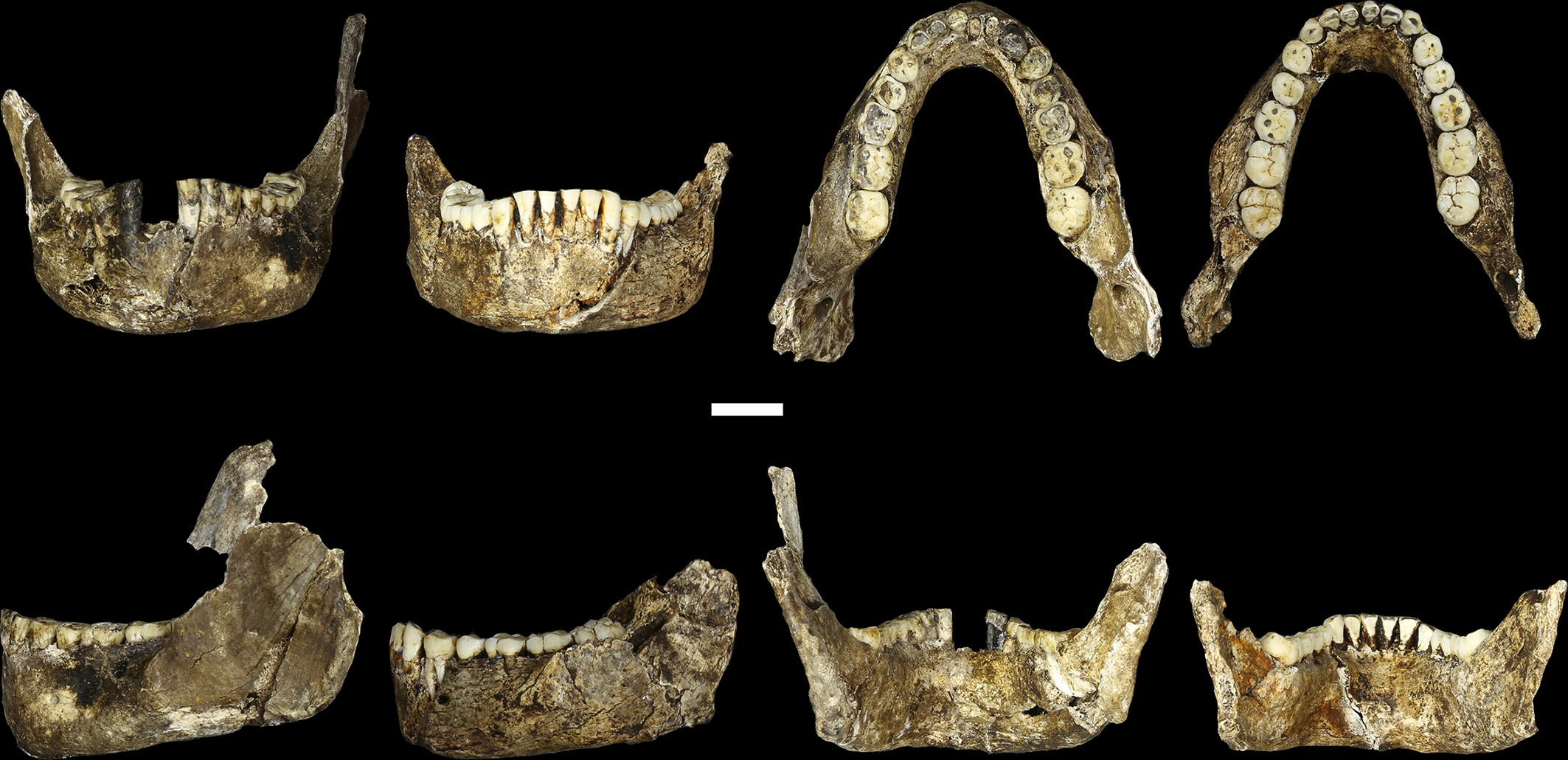
Lower jaws of
LES1 (left) and DH1 (right)

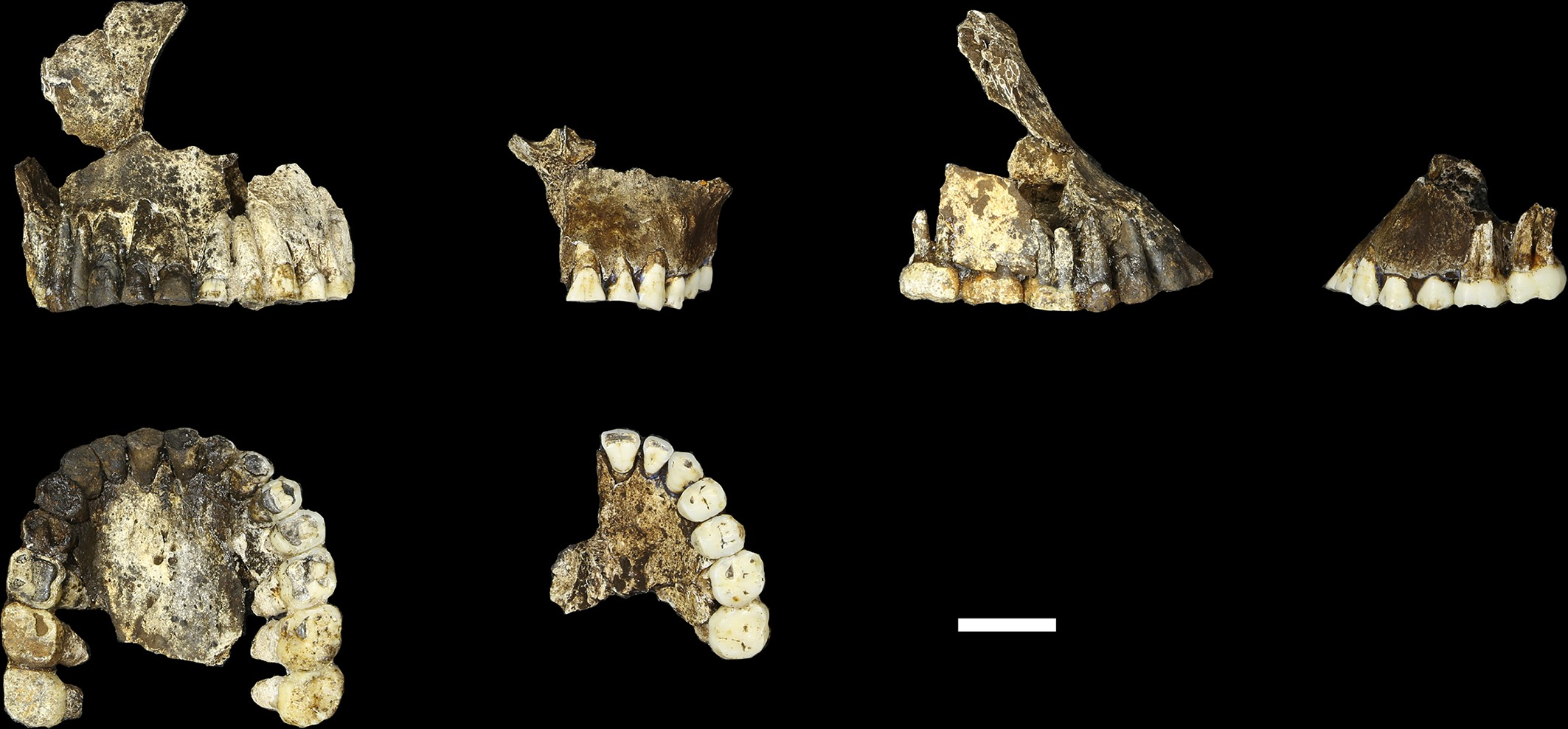
Upper jaws of
LES1 (left) and DH1 (right)

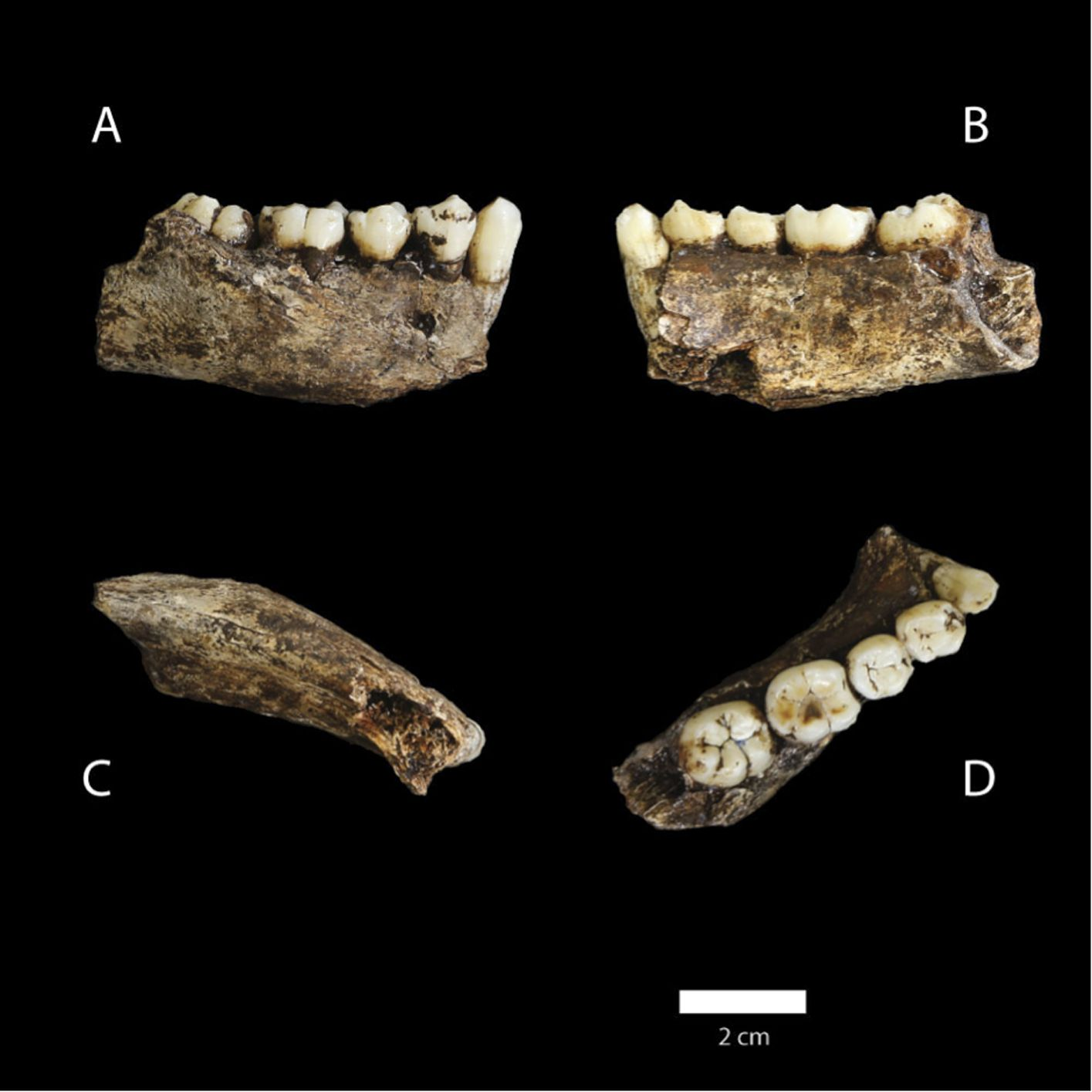
(A,B,C,D) Views of one lower jaw

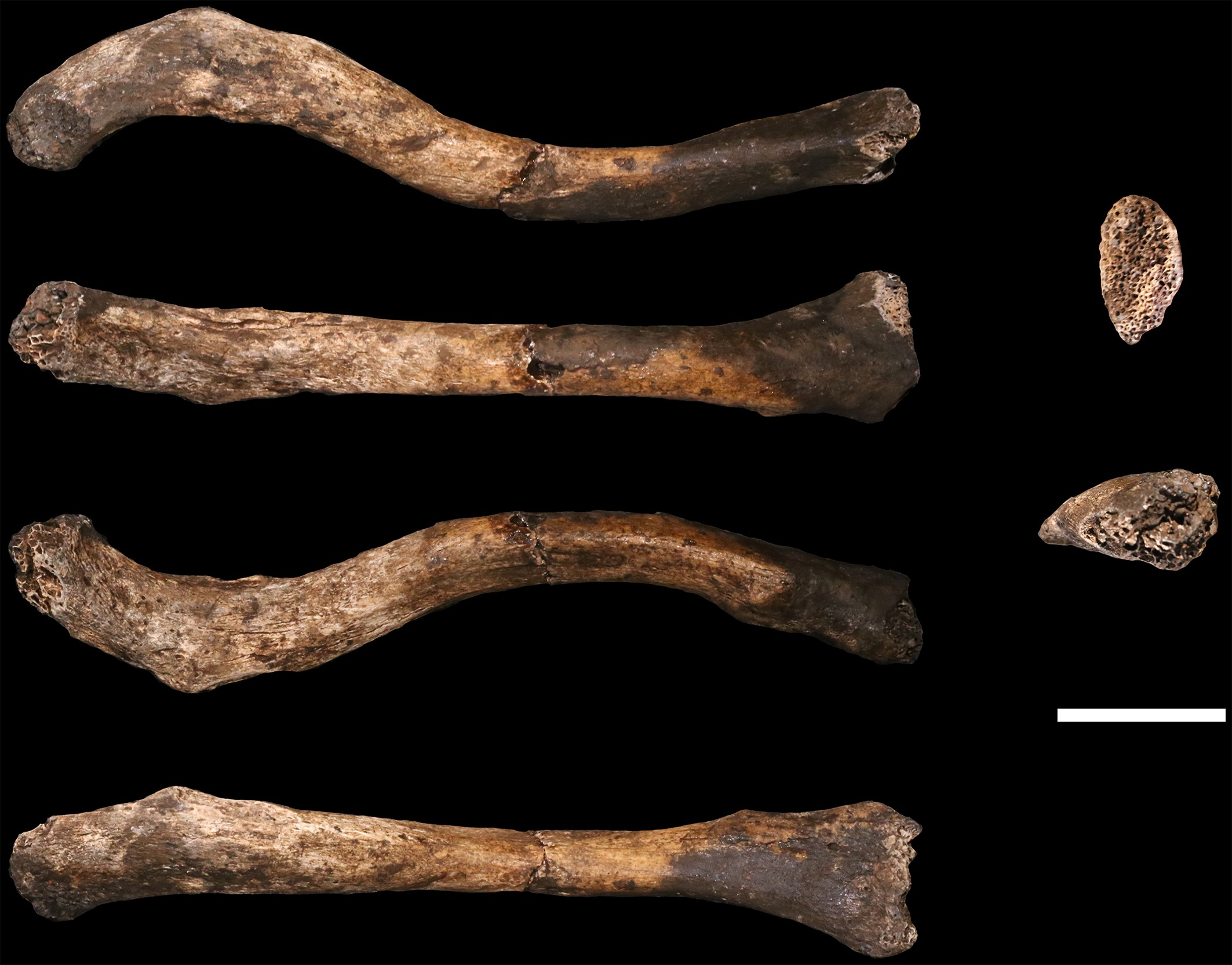
Views of one clavicle

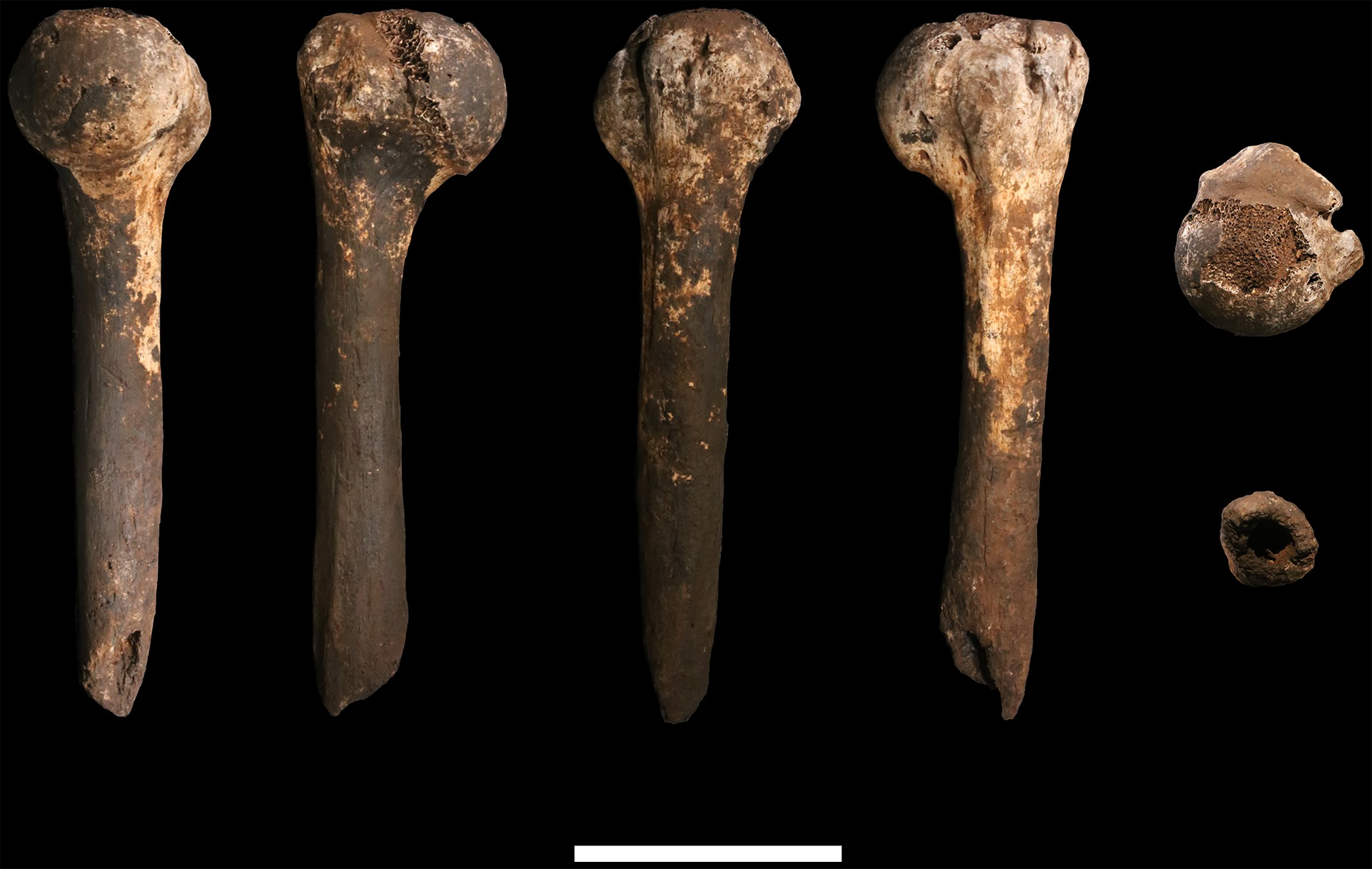
Views of one humerus

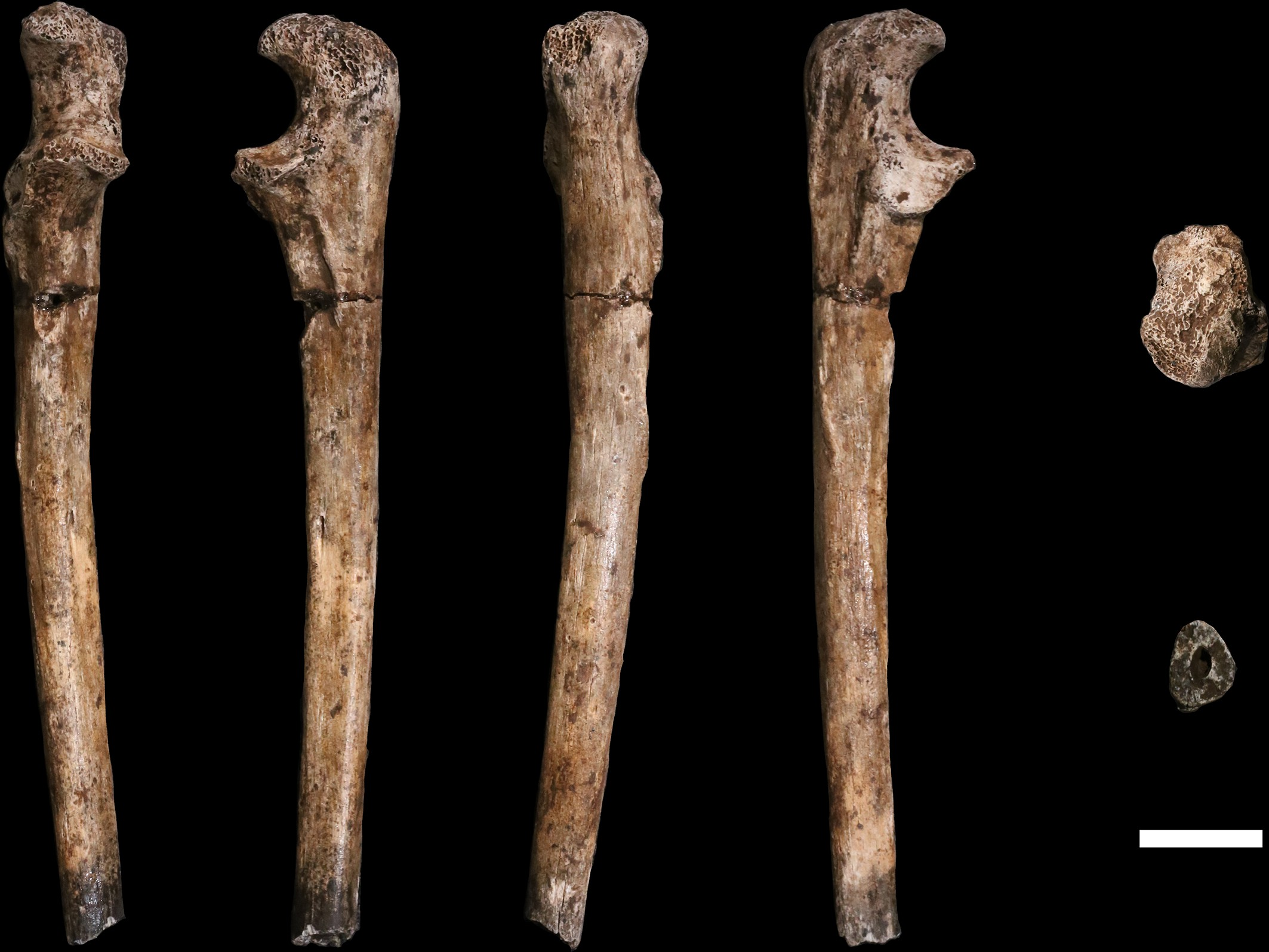
Views of one ulna

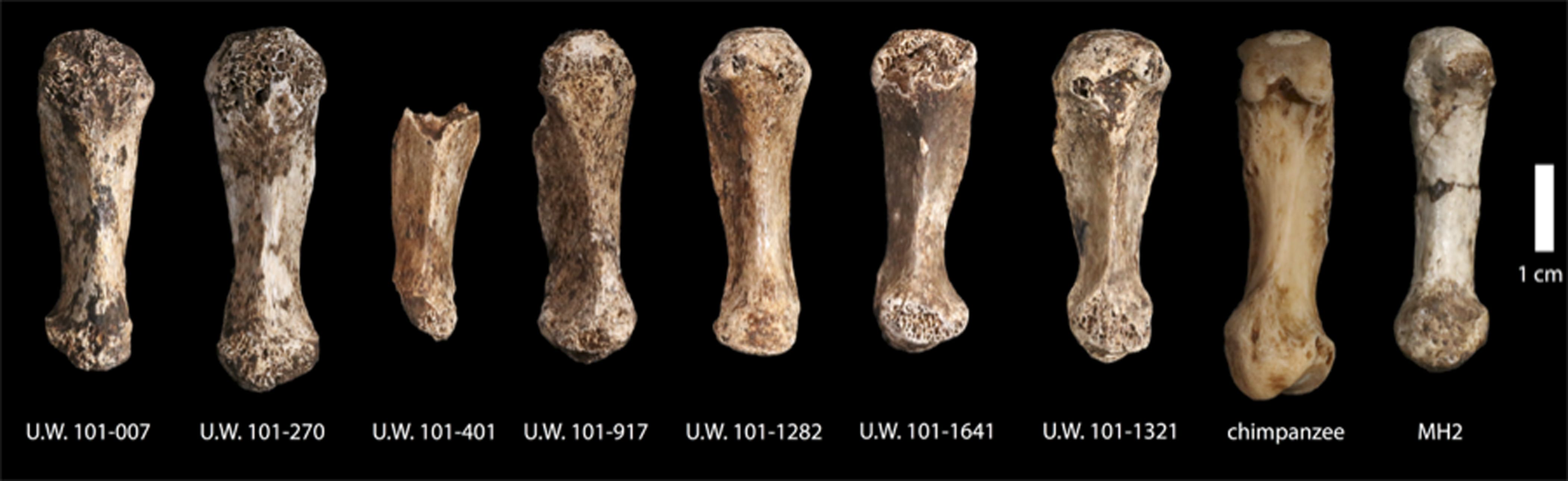
Metacarpals from several individuals, each labeled

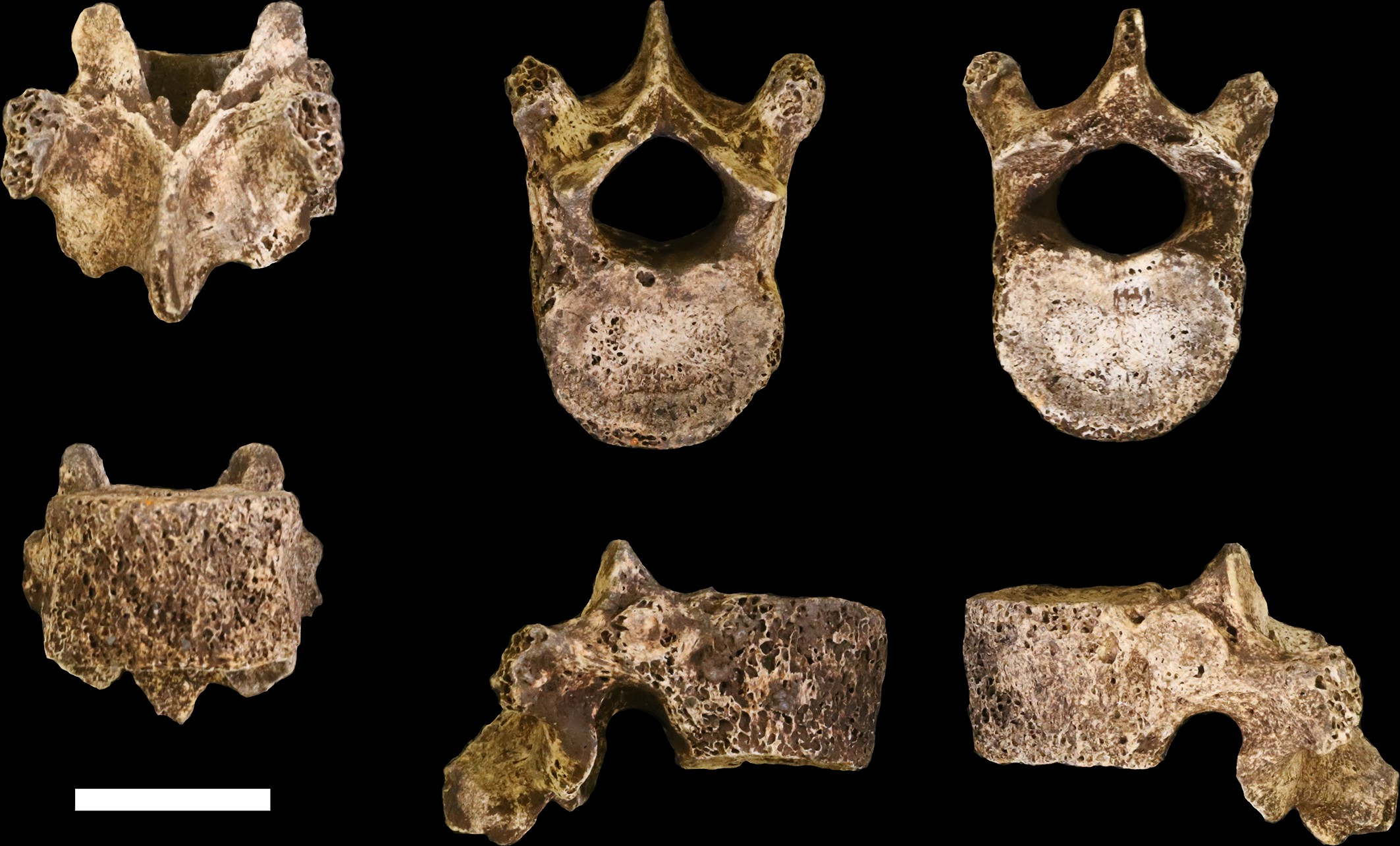
Views of a tenth thoracic vertebra

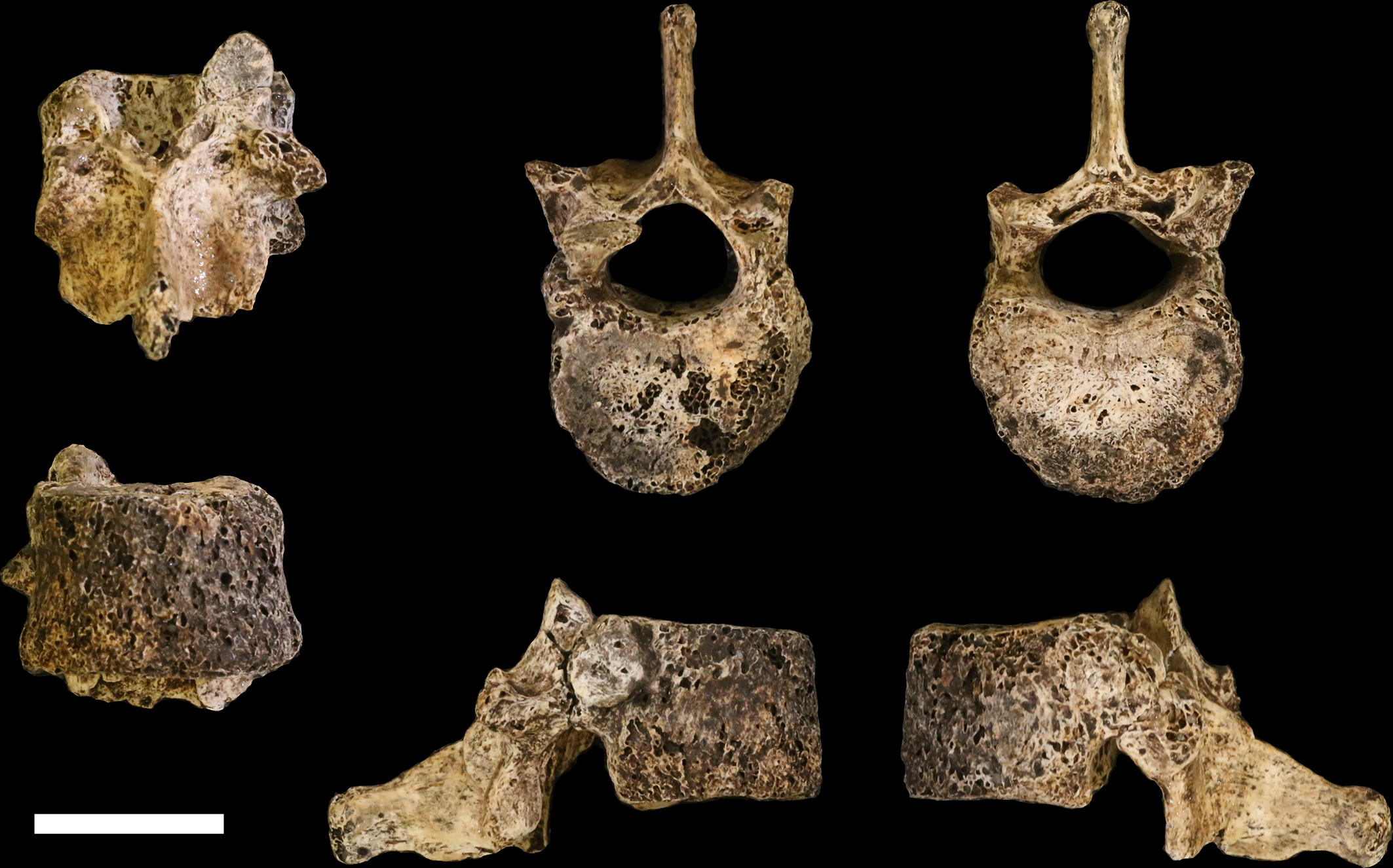
Views of an eleventh thoracic vertebra

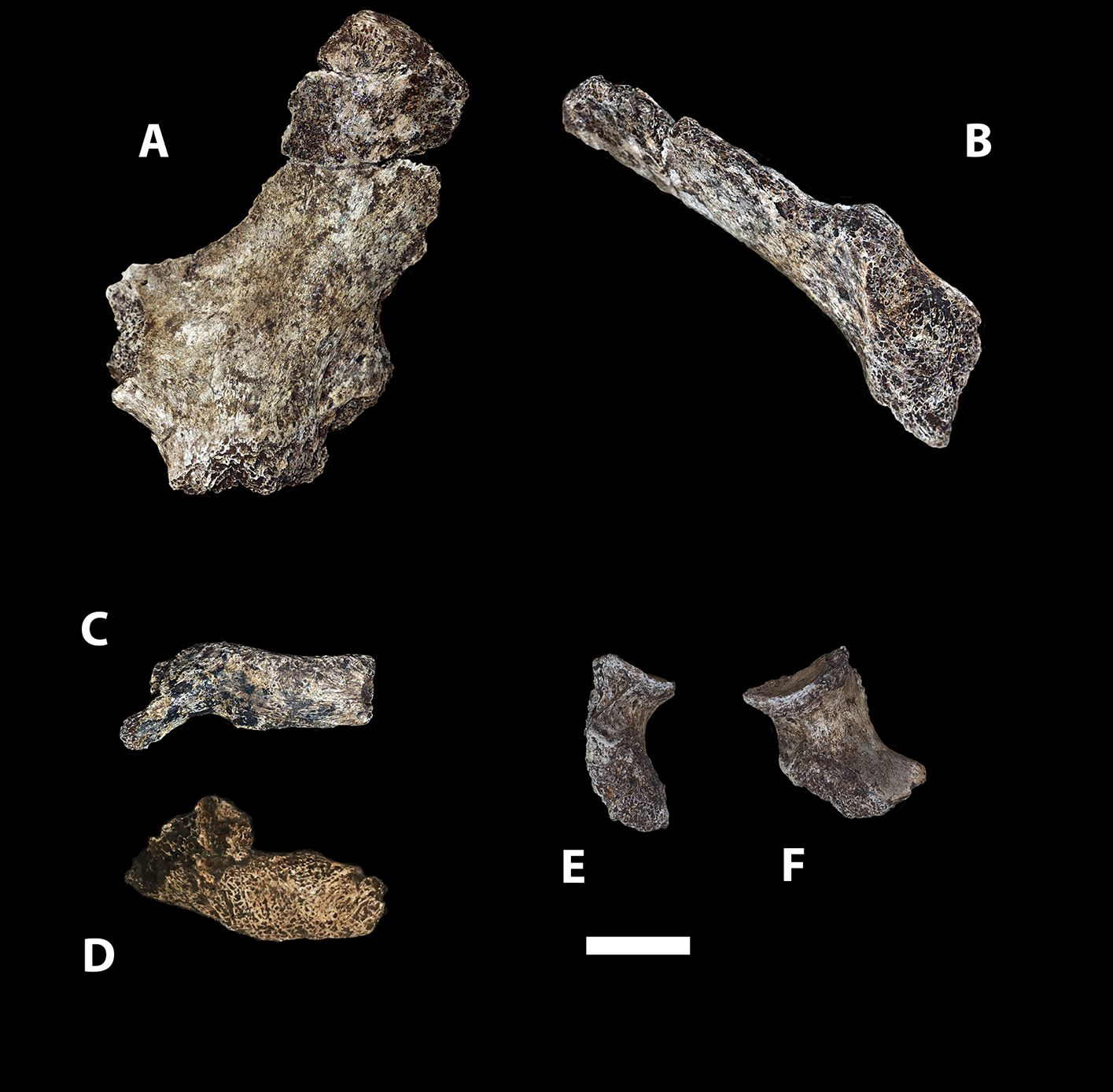
(A,B) ilium, (C,D) adolescent sacrum, (E,F) ischium

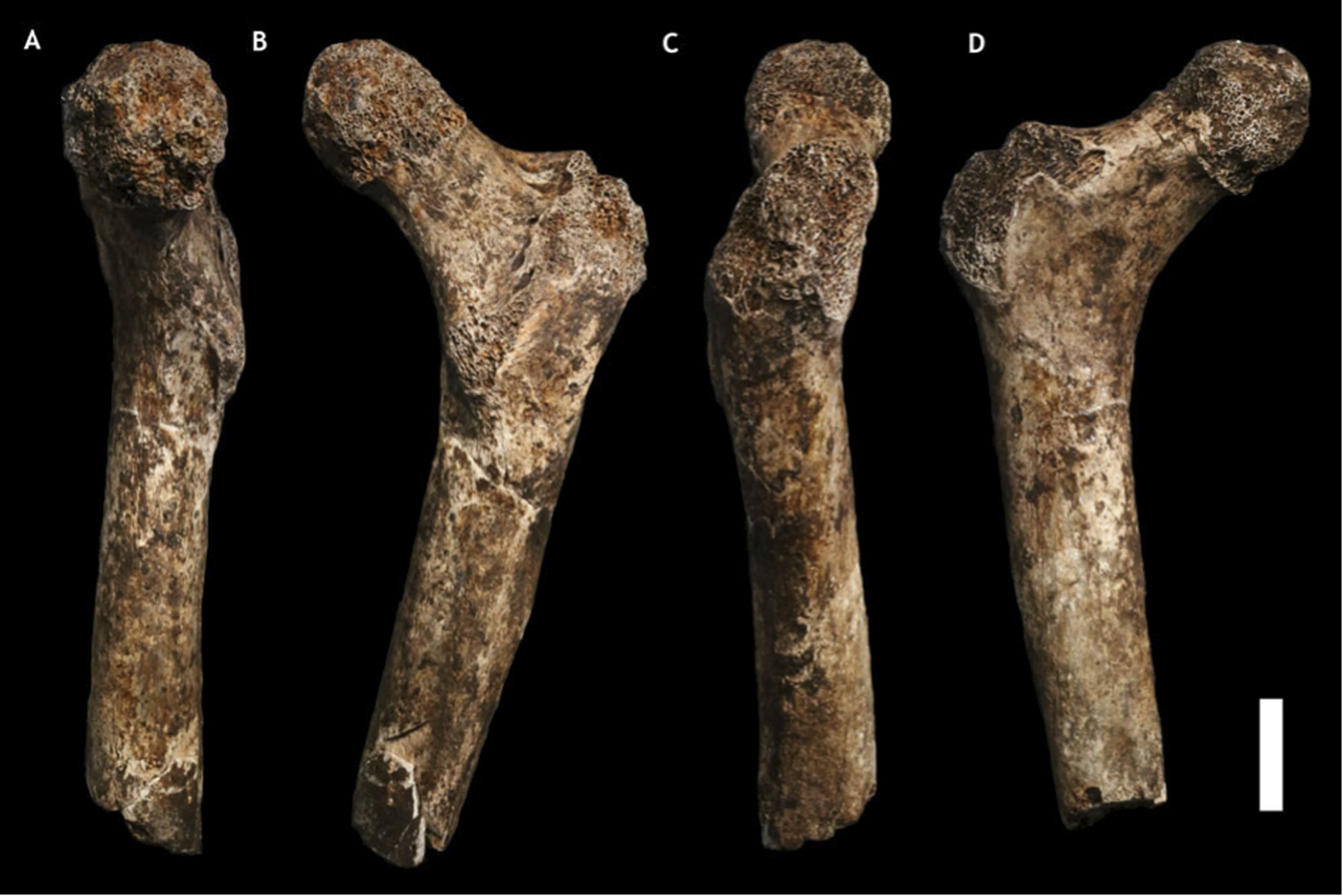
Views of one femur

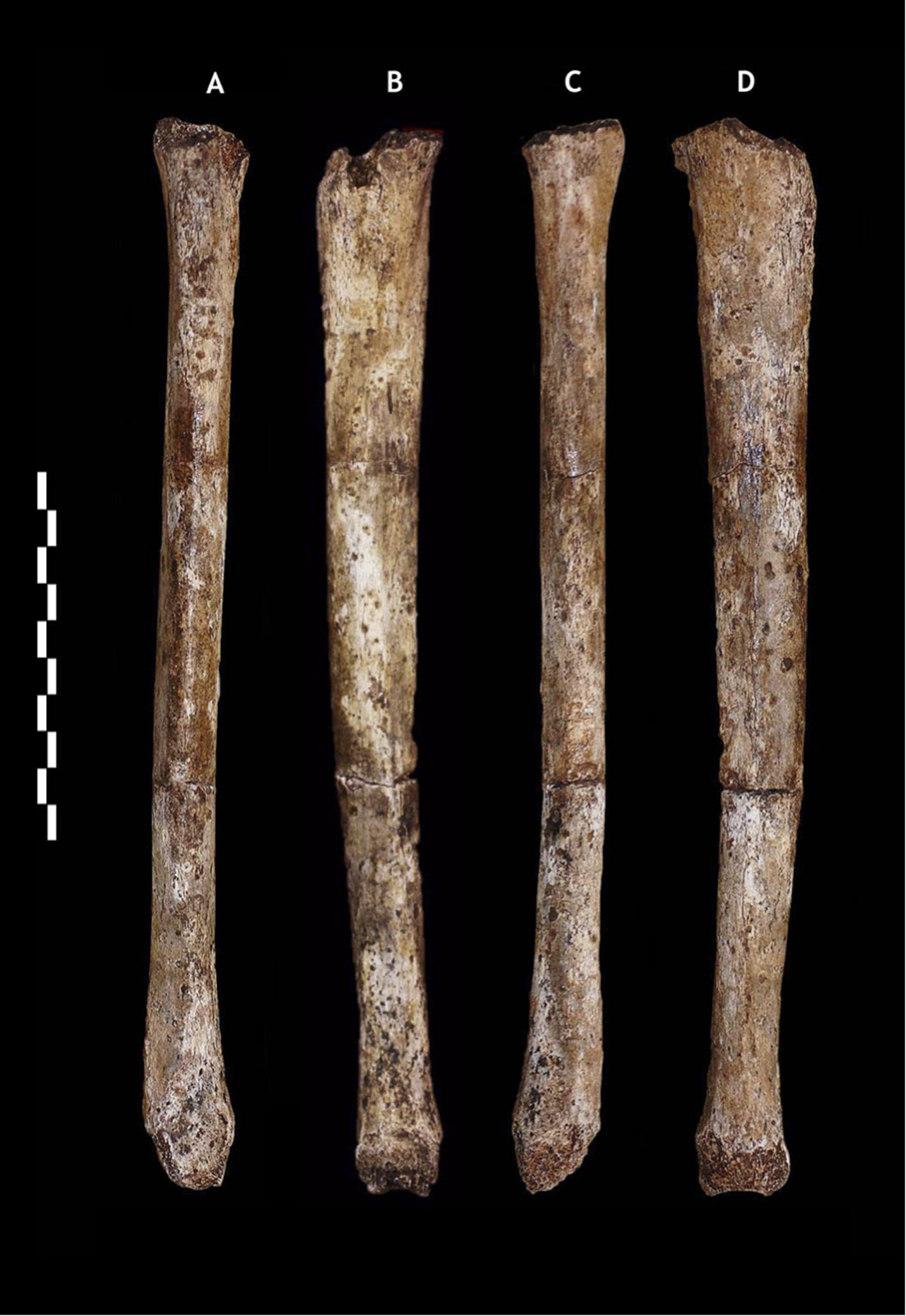
(A,B,C,D) Views of one tibia

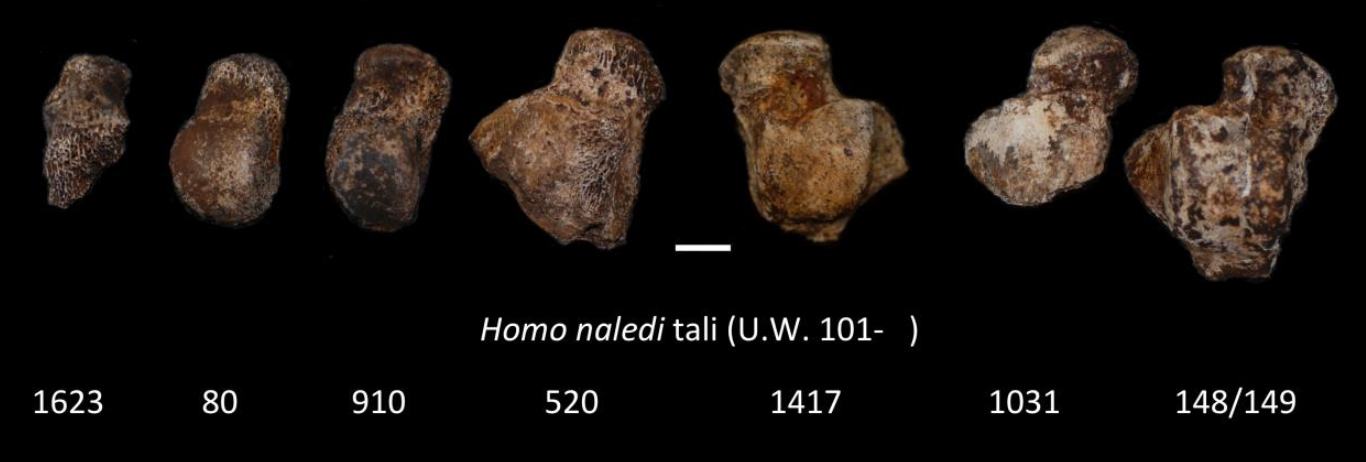
Ankle bones from several individuals, each labeled

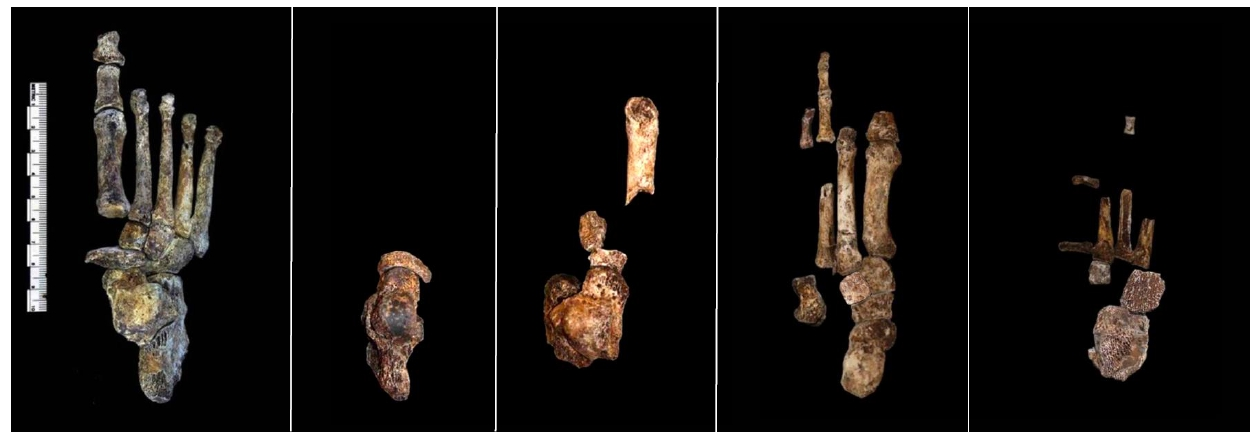
(1) adult right foot, (2) juvenile left, (3,4) adult left, (5) juvenile right

== See also ==
- African archaeology
- Australopithecus sediba – Extinct hominin from South Africa
- Denisovan – Archaic human species from Asia
- Homo luzonensis – Archaic human from Luzon, Philippines
- Homo floresiensis – Extinct small human species found in Flores
- Neanderthal – Extinct species of human
- Timeline of human evolution
