= Milford H. Wolpoff =

American paleoanthropologist

- Born: 1942 (age 83–84); Chicago, Illinois
- Education: University of Illinois at Urbana–Champaign
- Known for: Multiregional origin of modern humans
- Awards: Darwin Lifetime Achievement Award (2011); W.W. Howells Book Prize (1999)
- Scientific career
- Fields: Anthropology
- Workplaces: University of Michigan
- Doctoral advisor: Eugene Giles
- Notable students: Tim D. White; Mary Doria Russell; John D. Hawks

Milford Howell Wolpoff is a paleoanthropologist and professor of anthropology at the University of Michigan and its museum of Anthropology. He is the leading proponent of the multiregional evolution hypothesis that explains the evolution of Homo sapiens as a consequence of evolutionary processes and gene flow across continents within a single species. Wolpoff authored the widely used textbook Paleoanthropology (1980 and 1999 eds.), and co-authored Race and Human Evolution: A Fatal Attraction, which reviews the scientific evidence and conflicting theories about the interpretation of human evolution, and biological anthropology's relationship to views about race.

Wolpoff is best known for his vocal support of the multiregional model of human evolution when it was challenged by the 'Out of Africa' theory. The basis for advancing the multiregional interpretation stems from his skepticism of punctuated equilibrium (the idea evolution typically proceeds with long static periods and abrupt changes, instead of gradual modification during speciation) as an accurate model for Pleistocene humanity, noting that speciation played a role earlier in human evolution.

== Education ==
Wolpoff was born in 1942 to Ruth (Silver) and Ben Wolpoff, in Chicago. He received an A.B. in 1964 with a major in anthropology and a minor in mathematics, and a PhD in 1969 in physical anthropology, with minors in zoology and archaeology, from the University of Illinois in Urbana, Illinois. His research advisor and intellectual mentor was Eugene Giles. He joined the faculty of the University of Michigan in 1971, and became a professor of anthropology in 1977.

== Professional work ==
Wolpoff was trained primarily as a paleoanthropologist at the University of Illinois under Eugene Giles. With his multidisciplinary training, he brings to the study of the human and non-human primate fossil record a background that combines evolutionary theory, population genetics, and biomechanics. With over 50 grants funded by the National Science Foundation, National Academy of Sciences, and the University of Michigan, Wolpoff has visited the museums where human and primate fossils are stored and has studied in detail and at length all the materials addressing the fossil evidence for human evolution across Europe, Asia, and Africa. His research foci have included the evolution and fate of the European Neandertals, the role of culture in early hominid evolution, the nature and explanation of allometry, robust australopithecine evolution, the distribution and explanation of sexual dimorphism, hominid origins, the pattern and explanation of Australasian hominid evolution, the contributions and role of genetics in paleoanthropological research, and the taxonomy of the genus Homo. In addition, he is a primary describer of many hominid fossil remains. Since 1976 Wolpoff has graduated more than 20 PhD students.

=== Multiregional evolution and the punctuated equilibrium theory ===
Drawing on this background and research experience, Wolpoff's continuing research in the last 15 years has been the development, articulation, and defense of his multiregional model of human evolution. He suggests that after an African origin of the Homo lineage (including Homo ergaster/Homo erectus) and the subsequent migration of H. erectus throughout much of the globe (Africa, Europe, Asia), local evolutionary events took place, and when they were advantageous, they spread everywhere else. According to Wolpoff, populations of Homo evolved together as a single species. Change in Pleistocene populations did not involve speciation (the splitting of one species into two): all this time, the geographically distinct populations maintained small amounts of gene flow. This idea directly challenges the Out of Africa model, which claims Homo sapiens evolved recently as a new species in Africa, and then dispersed throughout the Old World, replacing the existing human populations without mixing with them.

His theory evoked rivalry with the proponents of punctuated equilibrium, Stephen Jay Gould and Niles Eldredge, who endorsed H. erectus as a model of their theory. In an earlier example of punctuated evolution preceding the global diffusion of Homo sapiens genes from Africa, some two million years ago, Wolpoff points to evidence of an earlier 'genetic revolution' that took place in a small group isolated from australopithecine forebears. "The earliest H. sapiens remains differ significantly from australopithecines in both size and anatomical details," he notes, "Insofar as we can tell, these changes were sudden and not gradual."

== Awards and honours ==
Wolpoff is a member of many anthropological organizations, and is an Honorary Life Member of the Honor Society of Phi Kappa Phi, a Fellow of the American Association for the Advancement of Science (in 2001) and Fellow of the American Anthropological Association. Some notable awards are

- LS&A Excellence in Education Award in 1998
- W.W. Howells Book Prize in Biological Anthropology, presented by the Biological Anthropology Section of the American Anthropological Association in 1999
- Dragutin Gorjanović-Kramberger Award at the Krapina 1899–1999 Conference, presented by the Croatian Natural History Museum
- Sigma Xi Distinguished Lecturer of 2001–2004
- Darwin Lifetime Achievement Award from the American Association of Physical Anthropologists in 2011

== Media ==
=== Books and monographs ===
- 1971 Metric Trends in Hominid Dental Evolution. Case Western Reserve Studies in Anthropology 2. Case Western Reserve University Press, Cleveland; 244 pp.
- 1976 William R. Farrand, Richard W. Redding, Milford H. Wolpoff, and Henry T. Wright, III). An Archaeological Investigation on the Loboi Plain, Baringo District, Kenya. Museum of Anthropology, The University of Michigan Technical Reports Number 4, Research Reports in Archaeology, Contribution 1, Ann Arbor.
- 1980 Paleoanthropology. Knopf, New York; 379 pp. ISBN 0-394-32197-9
- 1988 Jakov Radovčić, Fred H. Smith, Erik Trinkaus, and Milford H. Wolpoff . The Krapina Hominids: An Illustrated Catalog of the Skeletal Collection. Mladost Press and the Croatian Natural History Museum, Zagreb.
- 1994 Paleoanthropology. Preliminary publication of the 2nd edition. College Custom Series, McGraw-Hill, New York. ISBN 0-07-071679-X
- 1995 Human Evolution. 1996 edition. College Custom Series, McGraw-Hill, New York. ISBN 0-07-071827-X
- 1996 Human Evolution. 1996-1997 edition. College Custom Series, McGraw-Hill, New York. ISBN 0-07-071833-4
- 1997 Milford H. Wolpoff and Rachel Caspari: Race and Human Evolution. Simon and Schuster, New York. ISBN 0-684-81013-1. Published in paperback in 1998 by Westview press ISBN 0-8133-3546-9. A Canadian National Institute for the Blind talking book RC18623 (4 cassettes, narrated by Roy Avers).
- 1999 Paleoanthropology. 2nd edition. McGraw-Hill, New York. ISBN 0-07-071676-5. Reviewed by A. Bilsborough (2001) Clash of the Titans. Journal of Human Evolution 41:701-709.

His work with Rachel Caspari, Race and Human Evolution earned them the W.W. Howells Book Prize in 1999. Besides these, he has published 5 other books, 160 papers, and 22 book reviews, has presented numerous lectures and meetings papers, and has had many interviews and video appearances.

=== Magazines and films ===
Wolpoff has also appeared in The New York Times, New Scientist, World Archaeology, Discover, and Newsweek. He has appeared in numerous video documentaries, notable ones include

- Origins (SABC) in 1990
- Beyond 2000 (Video Australia), The Roots of Humanity (NHK) and The Dawn of Humankind (PBS) in 1992
- Apeman (4 part series produced by Granada TV), Dead Men Talk (Equinox), Wir Neandertaler (ORF) and Paleoworld: Missing Links (New Dominion in 1994)
- Paleoworld: Trail of the Neanderthal (TLC) in 1995
- Ancient Mysteries: The Fate of the Neandertals (A&E), The Last Neandertal (Discovery) and Bipedalism and Human Evolution (TCJ) in 1997
- Neanderthals on Trial (Nova) and Creationism and Evolution (PBS) in 2002
- The Lapedo Child (Anglica Television) in 2003
