= Eske Willerslev =

Danish evolutionary geneticist

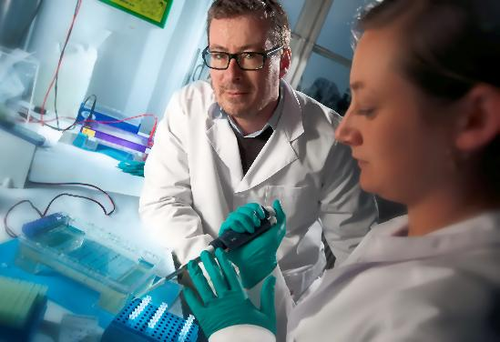
- Eske Willerslev in the laboratory
- Born: 5 June 1971 (age 55); Gentofte, Denmark
- Education: University of Copenhagen (MSc, DSc)
- Awards: Haldane Lecture (2017); EliteForsk Prize (2011); Order of the Dannebrog (2017)
- Scientific career
- Fields: Evolution; Genomics; Population genetics; Ancient DNA; Environmental DNA
- Workplaces: University of Copenhagen; University of Cambridge; University of Oxford; University of California, Berkeley
- Thesis: Recovery and analysis of ancient DNA from ice, sediments, and fossil remains (2004)
- Website: www.zoo.cam.ac.uk/directory/professor-eske-willerslev

Eske Willerslev (born 5 June 1971) is a Danish evolutionary geneticist notable for his pioneering work in molecular anthropology, palaeontology and ecology. He currently holds the Prince Philip Professorship in Ecology and Evolution at University of Cambridge, UK and the Lundbeck Foundation Professorship in Evolution at Copenhagen University, Denmark. He is director of the Centre of Excellence in GeoGenetics, a research associate at the Wellcome Trust Sanger Institute and a professorial fellow at St John's College, Cambridge. Willerslev is a foreign associate of the National Academy of Sciences (US) and holds the Order of the Dannebrog issued by her Majesty Queen Margrethe II of Denmark in 2017.

== Early life and education ==
Willerslev was born in Gentofte, north of Copenhagen, as the son of historian Richard Willerslev and Lona Loell Willerslev. He has a younger sister, Anne Willerslev, an ophthamologist, and an identical twin brother, Rane Willerslev, an anthropologist and director of the National Museum of Denmark. He attended Ordrup Gymnasium.

Before becoming a scientist Willerslev led several expeditions in Siberia in the early 1990s with his twin brother, collecting ethnographic materials and megafauna skeleton remains. These objects are stored at the Danish Moesgaard Museum, the largest Siberian ethnographical collection in Denmark. Willerslev also lived as a fur trapper in the Sakha (Yakutia) Republic from 1993 to 1994. He obtained his Doctor of Science (DSc) degree from Copenhagen University in 2004.

== Career ==
In 2003 Willerslev moved to the University of Oxford as an independent Wellcome Trust Fellow, a position he held until 2005. In 2004, at the age of 33, he became a full professor at University of Copenhagen, making him the youngest professor in Denmark at the time. In 2014 he became an adopted member of the Crow Tribe in Montana (Apsaalooke), where he carries the name ChiitdeeXia'ssee (Well Known Scout). In 2015 Willerslev took up the Prince Philip Professorship of Ecology and Evolutionary Biology at University of Cambridge.

Willerslev is a Foreign Associate Member of the National Academy of Sciences (USA), an elected member of the Royal Danish Academy of Sciences and Letters, and an honorary doctor at both University of Oslo and University of Tartu. He also holds the Order of the Dannebrog, an order of chivarly issued by Queen Margrethe II of Denmark. He has been a visiting professor at the University of Oxford and a Visiting Miller Professor at the University of California, Berkeley.

Willerslev has received several awards including the Antiquity Prize for the best paper in the journal Antiquity in 2009, the Danish Independent Research Council's Major EliteForsk Prize, the Rosenkjær award for science communication, and the Genius Award (Geniusprisen) of Danish Science journalists for "an impressive array of research successes in the public eye, combined with a unique tour-de-force through university". In 2023 he was awarded the Balzan Prize.

== Research ==
=== Environmental DNA ===
During his MSc project Willerslev and colleagues were the first to obtain ancient DNA directly from ice cores. Later Willerslev and his team expanded on this approach and were the first to show that DNA from plants, mammals, and birds can be obtained directly from ancient as well as modern environmental samples (environmental DNA). Willerslev later showed that environmental DNA can also be obtained from a variety of settings including basal ice and revealed a forested Greenland some 400,000 years ago, questioning if southern Greenland was ice free during the last interglacial. His team has also used environmental DNA to reveal forested refugia in Scandinavia during the last interglacial, and that forbs rather than grasses were dominating the steppe environments of the northern hemisphere during the Pleistocene and were an important food source for the megafauna.

Using environmental DNA, Willerslev and collaborators estimated that woolly mammoth in mainland Alaska survived more than 3,500 years earlier than previously thought, thereby dismissing the Blitzkrieg and Impact hypotheses for megafauna extinction. They also clarified the importance of climate change as a driver of megafauna population dynamics, and the decline of protein-rich forbs during the Pleistocene extinctions.

In 2017 Willerslev's team was the first to apply a metagenomic approach to environmental DNA, reconstructing the biological succession of North America's interior Ice-Free Corridor. Environmental DNA analyses showed the Ice-Free Corridor's transition from being a steppe environment with mammoth and bison, to an open populous-dominated forest inhabited by elk, and ending as the conifer forest with species like moose of today. They also claim the interior Ice-Free Corridor is not the first route for early Americans moving south to lower North America from Alaska, given that it first became viable for human occupation 12.6 thousand years ago, i.e., after Clovis and pre-Clovis occupation was seen in the lower 48 states.

Willerslev and his team obtained and identified two-million-year-old environmental DNA sequences from the Kap København Formation in Greenland that indicated that the region once had a forested ecosystem with a wide variety of animal life. They published their results in December 2022.

=== Ice Age megafaunal extinctions ===
Willerslev led the team that published in 2011 a large-scale genetic study on the population dynamics of six Late Pleistocene megafaunal species across the northern hemisphere: woolly mammoth, woolly rhinoceros, horse, reindeer, muskox, and reindeer, coupling their genetic data with climate niche modelling and the archaeological record. They found that climate has been a major driver of population change over the past 50 thousand years. However, each species responded differently to the effects of climatic change and human contact. Climate change can explain the extinction the Eurasian musk ox and woolly rhinoceros, while it is more likely that a combination of climate and humans was responsible for the extinction of Eurasian steppe bison and wild horse. The causes behind the extinction of the woolly mammoth were ambiguous. They did not find any genetic signature or any distinctive range dynamics distinguishing extinct (woolly mammoth and rhino) from surviving species (horse, musk ox, and reindeer), revealing the challenges associated with predicting future responses of extant mammals to climate and human-derived change to their habitats.

=== First whole-genome sequencing of an ancient human ===
In 2010 a team led by Willerslev sequenced the genome of a 4,000-year-old man from the Saqqaq culture of Greenland from his hair. This was the first whole-genome sequencing of an ancient human. The DNA obtained from the hair was fragmented into an average size of 55 base pairs. They revealed that the Saqqaq peoples represent a migration from Siberia to the Americas that is separate from that of Native American and Inuit ancestors. In 2014 his team showed that all paleoeskimos in the New World representing several distinct cultures all belonged to the same population as the Saqqaq man and that they lived in genetic isolation from Native Americans for almost 5,000 years before they died out about 700 years ago. This was the first genetic evidence for cultural change happening in isolation through the spread of ideas within a population rather than through meetings between different groups of peoples as seen e.g. during the European Neolithisation.

=== Early peopling of the Americas ===
In 2008 Willerslev led the DNA study on coprolites from the Paisley Caves in Oregon showing human presence in North America more than 14,000 years ago and about 1000 years prior to Clovis.

In 2013 his team discovered a genetic link between western Eurasians and Native Americans by sequencing the genome of the 24,000-year-old Mal´ta boy from central Siberia, showing that all contemporary Native Americans carry approximately 1/3 of their genome from the Mal'ta population.

In 2014 his team sequenced the Clovis-age genome from the 12,600-year-old Anzick boy from Montana and found it to be ancestral to many contemporary Native Americans, thereby rejecting the Solutrean theory for early peopling of the Americas. The boy's skeleton was later reburied through the support of Willerslev, and this event facilitated his adoption into the Crow tribe.

In 2015 Willerslev's team sequenced the genome of the Kennewick Man, a ca. 8,500 year old skeleton whose origin have been heavily debated. The DNA analyses showed Kennewick to be more closely related to Native Americans than to any other contemporary groups and rejecting claims of Kennewick Man being closely related to Japanese Ainu or Europeans.

How the first people migrated from Siberia into the Americas has been a topic of discussion. Two theories dominated: 1) People migrated through an ice-free corridor between the ice masses which covered large areas of North America around the end of the last ice age. 2) People migrated along the Pacific coast. In a 2016 paper in Nature, a scientific journal, Willerslev and co-authors showed that this ice-free corridor could not sustain humans until much later, thereby making it most likely that the early Americans migrated along the Pacific coast.

In 2018 Willerslev's team found a new group of peoples in the Americas that they termed "Ancient Beringians" – the earliest group of Native Americans to have diversified. This was done through sequencing the genome of an 11.5-thousand-year-old skeleton from Upward Sun River (USR) in Alaska. From this genome they could infer that:

1. the initial split between East Asians and Native Americans happened around 36 thousand years ago, with gene flow persisting until around 25 thousand years ago, likely when this group entered the Americas from Siberia.
2. Gene flow from the Maltá-like ancestor in Siberia into all Native Americans took place 25–20 thousand years ago, i.e., just around the time of entrance into the Americas.
3. That Ancient Beringians diversified from other Native Americans some 22–18.1 thousand years ago and are thus basal to the northern and southern Native American branches that diversified around 17.5–14.6-11.5 thousand years and to which all other Native Americans belong.
4. That, after 11.5 thousand years, some of the northern Native American populations received gene flow from a Siberian population more closely related to Koryaks than to Palaeo-Eskimos, Inuit, or Kets as has previously been suggested.
5. That Native American gene flow into Inuit was through northern and not southern Native American groups as previously argued by the Reich group.

Their findings finally suggest that the far-northern North American presence of northern Native Americans is from a back migration that replaced or absorbed the initial founding population of "Ancient Beringians".

=== Peopling of Australia ===
In 2011 Willerslev's team sequenced the first Aboriginal Australian genome from an historically ancient tuft of hair. The study revealed that Aboriginal Australians diversified from the Africans some 20-30 thousand years prior to the evolutionary split between Europeans and Asians. Secondary gene flow has resulted in Aboriginal Australians being more closely related to Asians than to Europeans. This study was followed up with a new study in 2016 in the journal Nature about the genetic history of the Australian Aboriginals.

=== Early peopling of Europe ===
Willerslev's team sequenced the genome of one of the earliest anatomically modern humans from Europe, Kostenki 14 from Russia, dated to be between 36-38,000 years old. The results show that most of the major genetic components present in Europeans today were present in Europe from early on. In 2014 his team undertook the first large scale past population genomic study reporting more than 100 ancient genomes from Bronze Age Europe and Asia. They found that lactose tolerance, common in northern Europe today, was not common even as late as 2,000 years ago. They also found evidence for major population movements and replacements in both Europe and Asia during the Bronze Age time and that significant parts of contemporary European and Asian genetic diversity were created during this period. They later showed that plague was a likely driver of Bronze Age population dynamics, which as of 2015 is the oldest genomes of Yersinia pestis (the etiological agent of plague) reported.

=== Early peopling of Central and South Asia ===
In 2018 Willerslev and colleagues published two papers in Nature and Science the same day addressing the population history of Central and Southern Asia. The Science paper deals with the spread of the Bronze Age pastoralists, such as Yamnaya and the peoples they met in Asia. They could show that descendants of the 24-thousand-year-old Maltá boy from Siberia survived in Central Asia until at least 5 thousand years ago and were the occupants of Botai – an archaeological site in Kazakhstan holding the oldest evidence of horse domestication some 5-6 thousand years ago. They further showed that, in contrast to Europe, early Bronze Age expansion of Yamnaya into Asia had limited genetic and linguistic impact in either Central Asia or in South Asia, contrary to earlier claims by the Reich group from Harvard. The paper thereby challenges the so-called "Steppe Hypothesis" for early spread of the Indo-European languages that seem to explain the early expansion of Indo-European languages into Europe but not Asia. The latter is argued to have happened by later Bronze groups, such as the Sintashta, and reaching all the way to India and Pakistan.

The accompanying Nature paper is based on 137 ancient human genomes of the Eurasian steppe mainly from the time following the Bronze Age. They find the genetics of the mounted Scythian groups that dominated the Eurasian steppes throughout the Iron Age were highly diverse, consisting of several ethnicities of European and Asian origins despite its highly uniform culture. Later, Scythians admixed and were replaced by steppe nomads from the east coming out of the Xiongnu confederations of Mongolia and China, including the westward-expanding Huns (fourth–fifth century AD). These were later admixed and replaced by expanding East Asian groups including Genghis Khan in the Medieval period. Accordingly, the events transformed the Eurasian steppes from being inhabited by Indo-European speakers of largely West Eurasian ancestry to the mostly Turkic-speaking groups of the present day, who are primarily of East Asian ancestry. According to Willerslev, this was all due to the long-distance traveling enabled by domestication of the horse.

=== Peopling of Southeast Asia ===
In 2018 Willerslev lead an international research team sequencing 26 ancient human genome sequences from across Southeast Asia, some dating back 8 thousand years, 4 thousand years earlier than previous sequences from the region. This was made possible by a modified whole genome capture approach. They used this data to test two hypotheses on southeast Asian population history: One theory argues that the indigenous Hòabìnhian hunter-gatherers who populated Southeast Asia from 44,000 years ago adopted agricultural practices independently, without the input from early farmers from East Asia. A second theory, referred to as the 'two-layer model', favours the view that migrating rice farmers from what is now China replaced the indigenous Hòabìnhian hunter-gatherers. They determined that neither interpretation fits the complexity of Southeast Asian history and that contemporary Southeast Asians have been influenced by at least four migration waves. The first wave is represented by Hòabìnhian hunter-gatherers who were closely genetically related to traditional hunter-gatherers in Malaysia, the Philippines, and the Andaman Islands (so-called "negritos"). The second wave derived from mainland China and brought with them farming economies such as rice 4000 years ago and mixed with the Hòabìnhians. These were followed by two additional migration waves; by 2 thousand years ago, Southeast Asian individuals carried additional East Asian ancestry components. One component likely represents the introduction of ancestral Kra-Dai languages in Mainland southeast Asia, and another the Austronesian expansion reaching Indonesia 2.1 thousand years ago and the Philippines 1.8 thousand years ago. Among their genomes was also an ancient Jōmon genome from Japan that showed shared genetic history with the Hòabìnhians.

=== Past disease genetics ===
Willerslev's team has been the first to conduct large scale genome sequencing of ancient pathogens. In 2015 they showed that plague was a likely driver of Bronze Age population dynamics, which as of 2015 represents the oldest reported genomes of Yersinia pestis (the etiological agent of plague). Later they showed that westward-expanding Huns carried with them plague that was basal to the Justinian plague, and are thus the likely source of its introduction in Europe killing millions as a result. In 2018 they published a large-scale study on ancient genomes of Hepatitis B (HBV). They found evidence of a long-term association of modern HBV genotypes with humans dating back at least 4.5 thousand years, which includes genotypes that are now extinct. They also found that in several cases, the geographical locations of the ancient genotypes do not match present-day distributions. Genotypes that today are typical of Africa and Asia, as well as a subgenotype from India, are shown to have an early Eurasian presence with humans, revealing a complexity of HBV evolution that is not evident when considering modern sequences alone.

=== Other research ===
Willerslev also led a study showing that living bacteria can take up ancient DNA by natural transformation allowing for genomic recycling of ancient genetic traits, and another study showing the survival of bacteria cells in permafrost for about 1/2 million years.

Willerslev and collaborators have sequenced the genome of a 700,000-year-old horse from Yukon in Canada, which as of 2016 was the oldest genome ever sequenced, until the publication of a million-year-old mammoth genome in 2021.

=== Outreach ===
Willerslev appears regularly in media such as magazines, newspapers, radio and TV when discussions turn to human evolution, migration, and the role of science in society. He and his staff at the Centre for GeoGenetics have participated in documentaries including The Great Human Odyssey (PBS/CBC/DR), Code Breakers (CBC/DR) and Equus - Story of the Horse (CBC/PBS/DR/ZDF), First Peoples (PBS), Search for the Head of John the Baptist, and How to Build and Ancient Man (both National Geographic). In 2016 he was featured in a profile article in The New York Times. Willerslev's work is also featured in the documentary Hunt for the Oldest DNA which aired on Nova in 2024.

== Personal life ==
His father's education of Eske and his brother was rather authoritarian and included frequent physical challenges, such as obstacle paths and swimming in ice water, starting from the age of six. His father thought this would help them to become hardy later in life.

Willerslev's father was fiercely atheist. However, influenced by numerous experiences living with native people, Willerslev came to respect, and to some extent believe, in supernatural powers unknown to science. Such experiences included encounters with descendants of Sitting Bull and trapper tribes in Siberia:

"Something similar happened to me when I shot a bear in Siberia. The tradition there is that you pin the bear's head high up in a tree, overlooking where the bear had its hunting grounds. I refused and instead took the bear's head with me home as a trophy. Back home, everything started to go wrong for me and I suffered terrible nightmares. In Siberia the trappers had told me, if I didn't hang up the head as required, all the bears in the world would know about it and hate me for it. I then took a trip to our summer house in Sweden and pinned up the bear's head in a tree there and the nightmares stopped."

At the age of 32, he was baptized as Christian, although he declares himself as "religious, but not Christian". Willerslev married Ulrikke Ji Mee Willerslev in 2007. They have two sons, Rasken Willerslev and Bror Willerslev. The family lives in Kongens Lyngby.
