= Centre for Geogenetics =

Danish Basic Research Centre of Excellence

The Centre for Geogenetics is a Danish Basic Research Centre of Excellence (Grundforskningscenter) which officially opened in September 2010. It is located at the Natural History Museum of Denmark, University of Copenhagen and financed by the Danish National Research Foundation.

== Research program ==
The centre originally focused on questions related to evolutionary biology and geology, but has expanded into various health and disease related topics. The program currently includes:

- How did the first human colonization of the Americas happen. The centre addresses the timing, routes and origin of these questions
- Why, how and when did the timing, nature and causes of the Late Quaternary megafaunal extinctions happen
- Origins, intermixing and migration routes of humans into the New World’s northern extremes (North America, Greenland)
- Providing long-term insights into the response of polar ecosystems and coastal sea ice cover to global warming
- Advance our understanding of the fundamental behavior of ancient DNA in sediments (Environmental DNA, eDNA, "dirt" DNA)
- Environmental DNA (eDNA) of water systems like oceans, lakes and streams from polar to tropical regions
- Detecting novel pathogens in relation to human cancer and inflammatory diseases

== People ==
The labs and offices host close to 110 people of some 20 different nationalities from all over the world. CGG has five research groups, each headed by a PI. The groups are: The Willerslev Group (headed by Professor Eske Willerslev), the Orlando/Paleomix Group (headed by Professor Ludovic Orlando), the Gilbert Group (headed by Professor Tom Gilbert), the Anthropocene-Quaternary Group (headed by Professor Kurt Kjær), and the Genetic Identification and Discovery (GID) Group headed by Deputy Director Anders J. Hansen. The centre is headed by Professor Eske Willerslev.

== Facilities ==
The centre holds up to date laboratories: including two ancient DNA laboratories; post-PCR/modern DNA laboratories; the National High-throughput Sequencing Centre; sediment core facility. Collections: The Quaternary zoology collections with Late Pleistocene and Holocene vertebrates from Denmark, Greenland and South America.

== Publications ==
Results from the centre have been published in Nature, Science and other journals and include: sequencing of the first ancient human genome and the first aboriginal Australian genome, both revealing previously unrecognized human migrations; establishing the first Holocene sea ice record from northern Greenland, underlying the causes of the Pleistocene/Holocene megafauna extinctions; and evidence of pre-Clovis occupation in North America.

In June 2013 researchers at the centre moved the limit for the oldest full genome sequence 10-fold when they sequenced a 700.000 year old horse genome.

As of August 2017 the centre's scientists have published more than 551 publications of which 32 were published in Nature and Science.

== See also ==
- Paleogenomics
