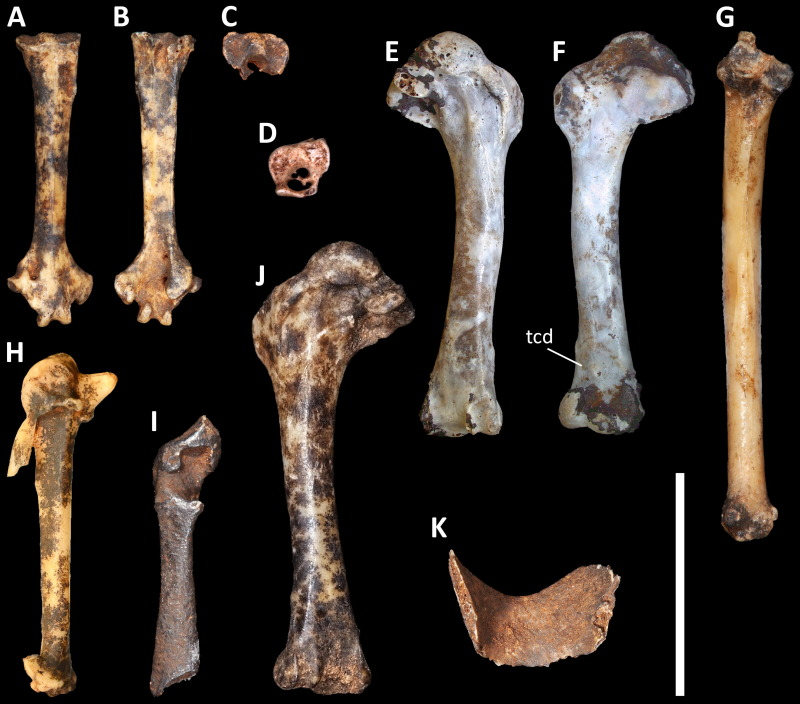
- Fossilized remains of A. longipes

Scientific classification
- Kingdom: Animalia
- Phylum: Chordata
- Class: Aves
- Order: Psittaciformes
- Family: Psittaculidae
- Genus: Agapornis
- Species: †A. longipes

Binomial name
- †Agapornis longipes Pavia et al., 2024

= Agapornis longipes =

Agapornis longipes Temporal range: Early Pleistocene, 2.5–1.38 Ma

Extinct species of lovebird

Agapornis longipes is an extinct species of lovebird that lived in what is now Gauteng, South Africa during the Early Pleistocene epoch, about 2.5–1.38 million years ago. The fossilized remains of this bird were first discovered in the Kromdraai fossil site and reported in 1969 by T.N. Pocock, though the species would not be named until decades later in 2024. By the time it was named, 96 bones attributable to this species had been collected over the years from three caves, namely Kromdraai, Swartkrans and Cooper's Cave, all located within the Cradle of Humankind World Heritage Site. Such a large number of fossils is unusual for a small bird, as the fragile bones of birds do not preserve easily and thus are usually found as fragments, yet the A. longipes remains include both complete and incomplete bones.

A. longipes was a small bird, with its wing bones showing that it would have been about the same size as the smaller extant lovebird species, yet its tarsometatarsus (one of the leg bones) was comparable in size to that of the largest living lovebirds. This indicates that the legs of this species were disproportionately long compared to other lovebirds, hence it was given the specific name longipes which means 'long-footed' in Latin. Though the many preserved specimens show that some individuals were larger than others, the body proportions did not change with size. The proportionally long legs are believed to be an adaptation for feeding on the ground, where the animal would forage for grass seeds among the dense vegetation of its environment, though it would presumably still breed in tree cavities like modern lovebirds.

Analysis of the fossil assemblage in the three caves where A. longipes remains have been found suggests that its natural habitat was mostly open grassland with nearby woodlands, and in some areas would also have large rocky outcrops or major bodies of water, though the exact conditions vary between the three localities. This environment is largely similar to what is seen in South Africa today, suggesting that this lovebird did not go extinct because of general habitat change, but possibly because of changes to the microclimate or the loss of a food source. It is believed that at least some of the A. longipes specimens were brought into the caves by western barn owls which preyed on the lovebirds and regurgitated the remains as pellets, considering the similarity of the fossil deposits to the debris seen under barn owl roost sites and the presence of barn owl fossils in the same area.

== Discovery and naming ==
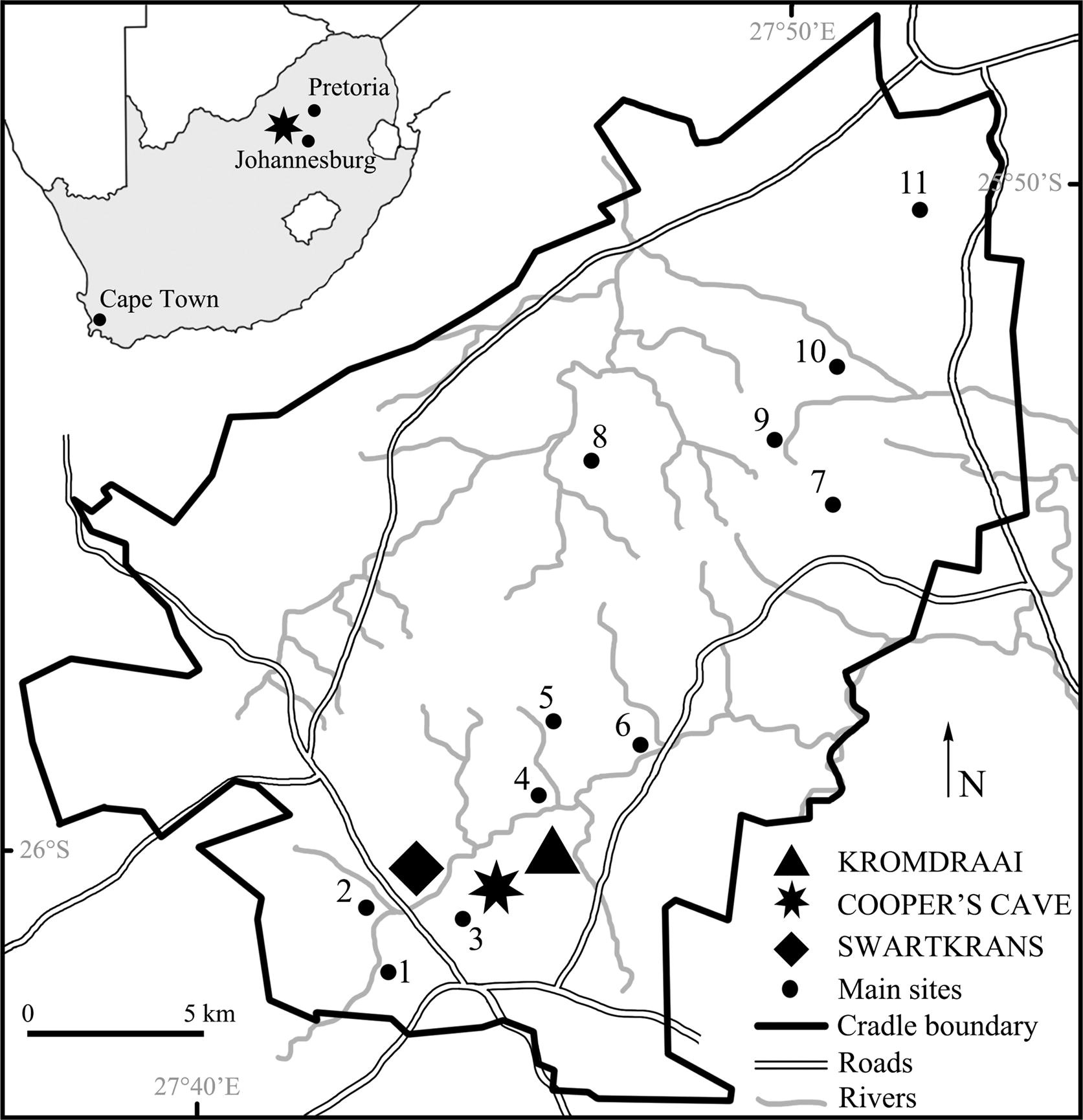
Map of the Cradle of Humankind with the sites where A. longipes fossils have been found labeled

All known fossilized remains of Agapornis longipes originate from the Cradle of Humankind, a World Heritage Site about 50 km (31 mi) northwest of Johannesburg, South Africa and consisting of many fossil-bearing caves. The first to be discovered were found decades before the species was named. In 1969, T.N. Pocock reported that remains of lovebirds belonging to the genus Agapornis have been discovered at the Kromdraai fossil site (one of the caves that would later be designated as part of the World Heritage Site). He believed that two species were represented by these specimens, a smaller species around the size of a budgerigar and a larger species, but did not assign any of the specimens to any named species. The presence of at least one lovebird species at Kromdraai was further confirmed in 2010, when Thomas A. Stidham reported that the fossilized humerus of a small lovebird had been discovered during excavations at the site between 1977 and 1980, and was being housed in the Transvaal Museum. Stidham also added that the lovebird remains reported by Pocock had been lost. However this turned out to be incorrect, and those remains are actually kept at the Evolutionary Study Institute at the University of the Witwatersrand. Marco Pavia further published two papers reporting fossil remains of Agapornis, one in 2020 mentioning a humerus at Kromdraai, and the other in 2022 detailing a variety of small bones from the nearby Cooper's Cave. In both papers, Pavia identified the remains only to the genus level, stating that comprehensive analysis is needed for more specific identification.

In 2024, a study on the fossil lovebird remains found in the Cradle of Humankind was published. The authors of the study analysed specimens housed in the University of the Witwatersrand and the Ditsong National Museum of Natural History, including those formerly studied by Pocock, Stidham or Pavia, and concluded that they represent a single new species. The name Agapornis longipes was given to this species, with the specific name derived from the Latin words longus (meaning "long") and pēs (meaning "foot"). Bones of this lovebird were uncovered in three caves in the Cradle of Humankind, namely Kromdraai, Cooper's Cave and Swartkrans, and the authors described a series of remains found between 1979 and 1986 by paleontologist Bob Brain in detail. Birds have fragile bones, so fossils of small birds such as Agapornis are typically found in small fragments, but A. longipes was unusually represented by 96 bones, some entirely complete and others incomplete.

== Description ==
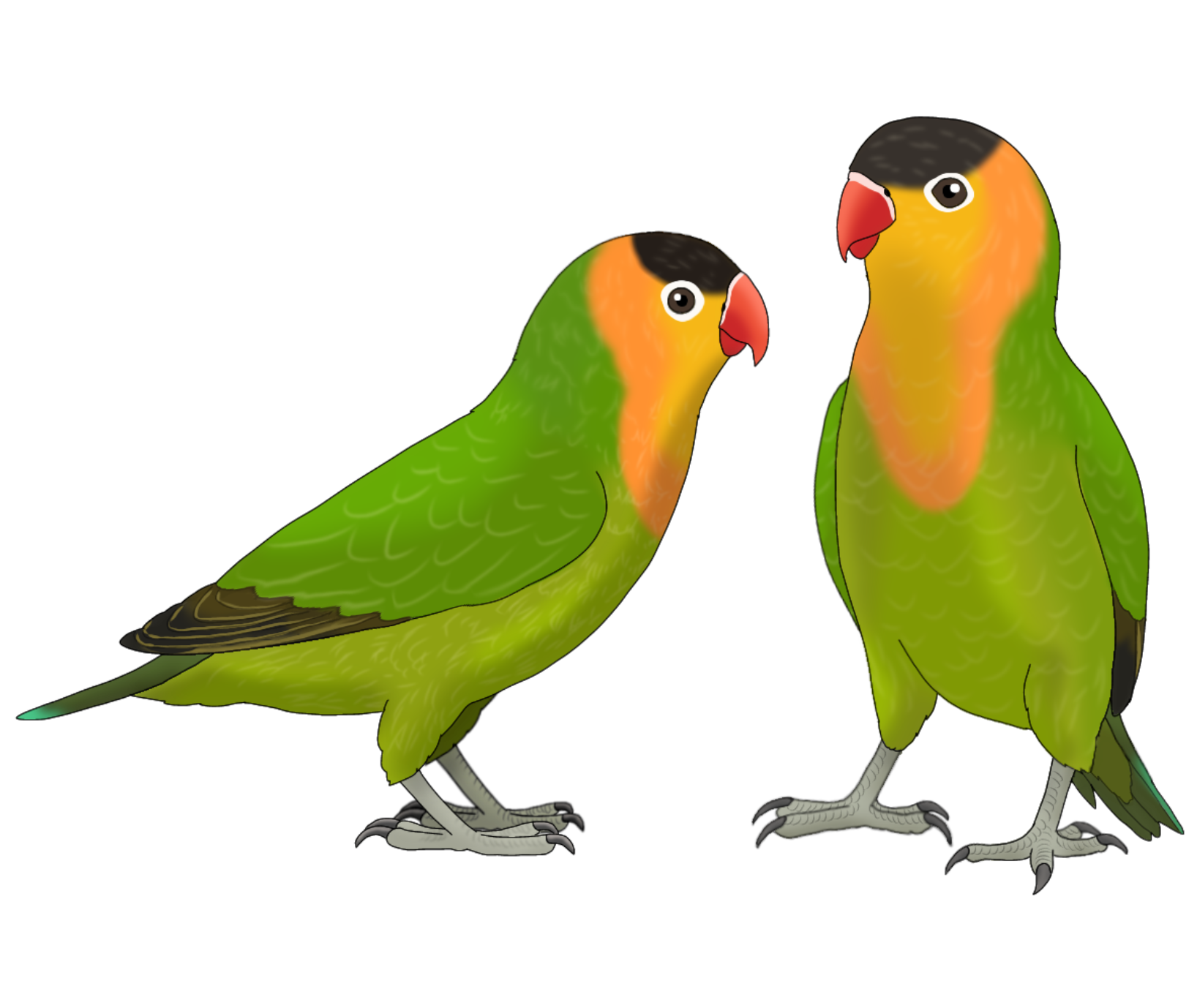
Life restoration of a pair of Agapornis longipes

Agapornis longipes was a small species of parrot with relatively large legs compared to other lovebirds. Its wing bones are comparable in size to those of the extant Fischer's, Lilian's and black-cheeked lovebirds, suggesting it was about as large as these small modern forms. However, the tarsometatarsus (a bone in the lower leg) of A. longipes is closer in size to that of larger lovebird species such as the black-winged and rosy-faced lovebirds. This makes the ratio of humerus to tarsometatarsus length in A. longipes the smallest of all known Agapornis species, indicating this species had long legs for a lovebird. Intraspecific variation in size is known in A. longipes, with some individuals being larger than others, though the ratio of wing length to leg length remains the same regardless of an individual's size. When remains of the species were first studied in 1969, it was thought that larger and smaller individuals represent two separate species. However, this size variation is within the range seen in extant lovebird species. In addition, no extant lovebird species overlap in distribution with one another, making it unlikely that A. longipes lived alongside a second species of lovebird.

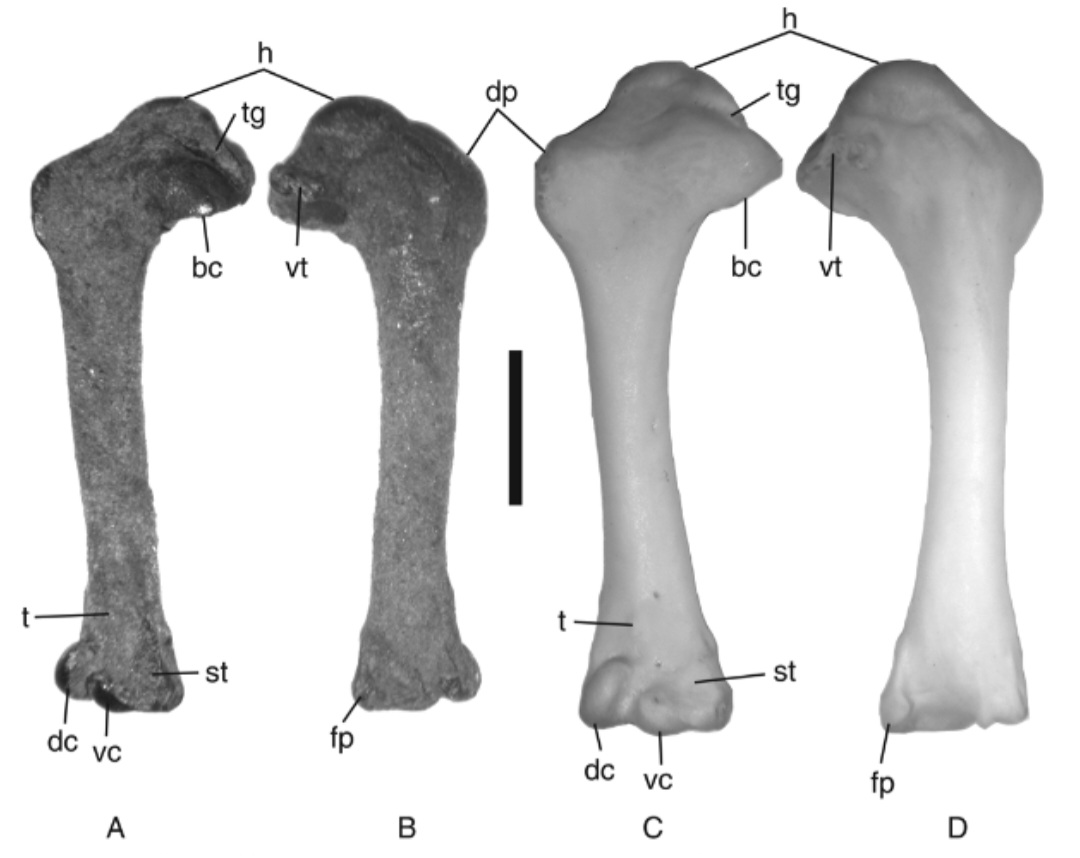
Humerus of Agapornis longipes (labeled A and B) compared to that of a modern rosy-faced lovebird (labeled C and D)

Only one scapulocoracoid (a unit of the shoulder girdle) of this species has been found, and the sternal part of it is not preserved. The clavicular facet of the scapula is large, with a protrusion on its ventral (lower) side, and overhangs a deep fossa (depression or hollow). On the dorsal (upper) side of the groove of the supracoracoideus muscles, there is a rounded tubercle. The humerus has a prominent dorsal tubercle and a deep attachment for the brachialis muscle, making it more similar to that of the extinct Agapornis attenboroughi than any extant lovebirds. The ulna of A. longipes has a curved shaft like that of all other lovebirds, but otherwise differs from them in having a less protruding, stouter olecranon (elbow protrusion) and a carpal tubercle which protrudes ventrally rather than distally (towards the underside instead of the wing tip). The carpometacarpus has an elongated, ridge-like pisiform process, which is a derived feature unique to the Agapornis genus. There is also a continuous ridge connecting the pisiform process to the alula process, a feature not seen in other lovebird species.

A single tibiotarsus of A. longipes is known, and is similar in structure to that of other lovebirds (and unlike most other African parrots). The tarsometatarsus has a canal where both the flexor hallucis longus muscle and the flexor digitorum longus muscle would have been attached, and a separate canal is present for the superficial flexor tendons. Such a canal structure of the tarsometatarsus is also known in other Agapornis species, as well as the related hanging parrots of the genus Loriculus. In A. longipes, the trochlea (pulley-like grooved structure) at the head of the third metatarsal protrudes further and is wider at the proximal end than in any living lovebird species, and the tarsometatarsus is also straighter and narrower at the proximal end.

== Paleobiology ==
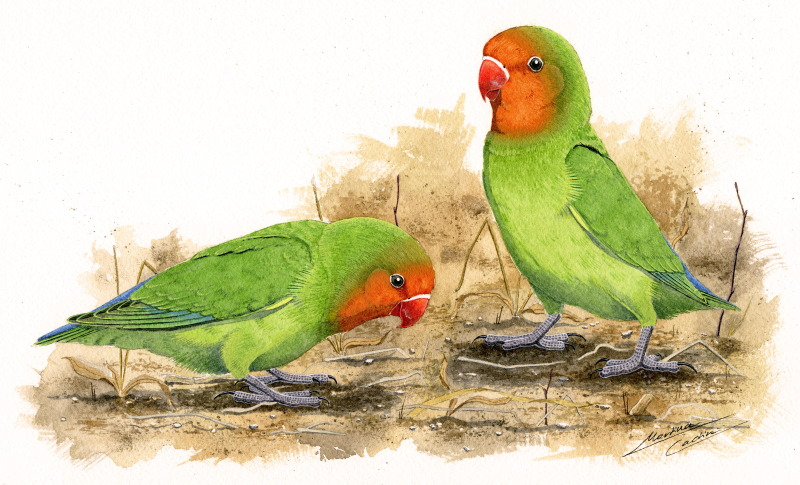
Life restoration of two Agapornis longipes feeding on the ground during the dry season

Because all but one living species of lovebirds eat mainly grass seeds and secondarily feed on fruit, it is believed that Agapornis longipes had a similar diet. While some extant lovebirds search for food in trees, the ones with comparably longer legs relative to their wings (namely the grey-headed, yellow-collared and Fischer's lovebirds) feed on the ground. A. longipes has the proportionally longest legs of all known lovebirds, suggesting that it lived primarily on the ground rather than in trees, feeding on grass seeds in the tall, dense vegetation of the South African grasslands. Even so, the breeding habits of A. longipes are still presumably similar to those of living lovebirds, which require tall trees with either natural cavities or holes made by other birds (such as African barbets and woodpeckers) to lay their eggs in. It was reported by T.N. Pocock in 1969 that one humerus found at the Kromdraai fossil site was of an immature bird, suggesting that the surrounding area was used as a nesting ground for A. longipes rather than simply being part of its non-breeding range.

Known from a large number of fossil remains, including 24 specimens of at least seven individuals from Cooper's Cave, A. longipes was likely a common animal in its natural habitat, being the fifth most common bird in terms of percentage of identified remains at this site and the third most common in terms of number of individuals represented. The species may be similarly abundant in Kromdraai, where it is known from 23 specimens, but since these remains are spread across multiple stratigraphic layers, it is difficult to verify the true abundance of this bird there. Some of the A. longipes specimens from Kromdraai and Cooper's Cave come from deposits with numerous small animal remains, which are believed to be debris from fossilized owl pellets. In particular, the remains in the Kromdraai deposits are most similar to debris under roost sites of western barn owls, and fossils attributed to Tyto cf. alba are known from both localities. This suggests that barn owls used these caves as roosting spots and were at least an occasional predator of A. longipes.

== Paleoenvironment ==
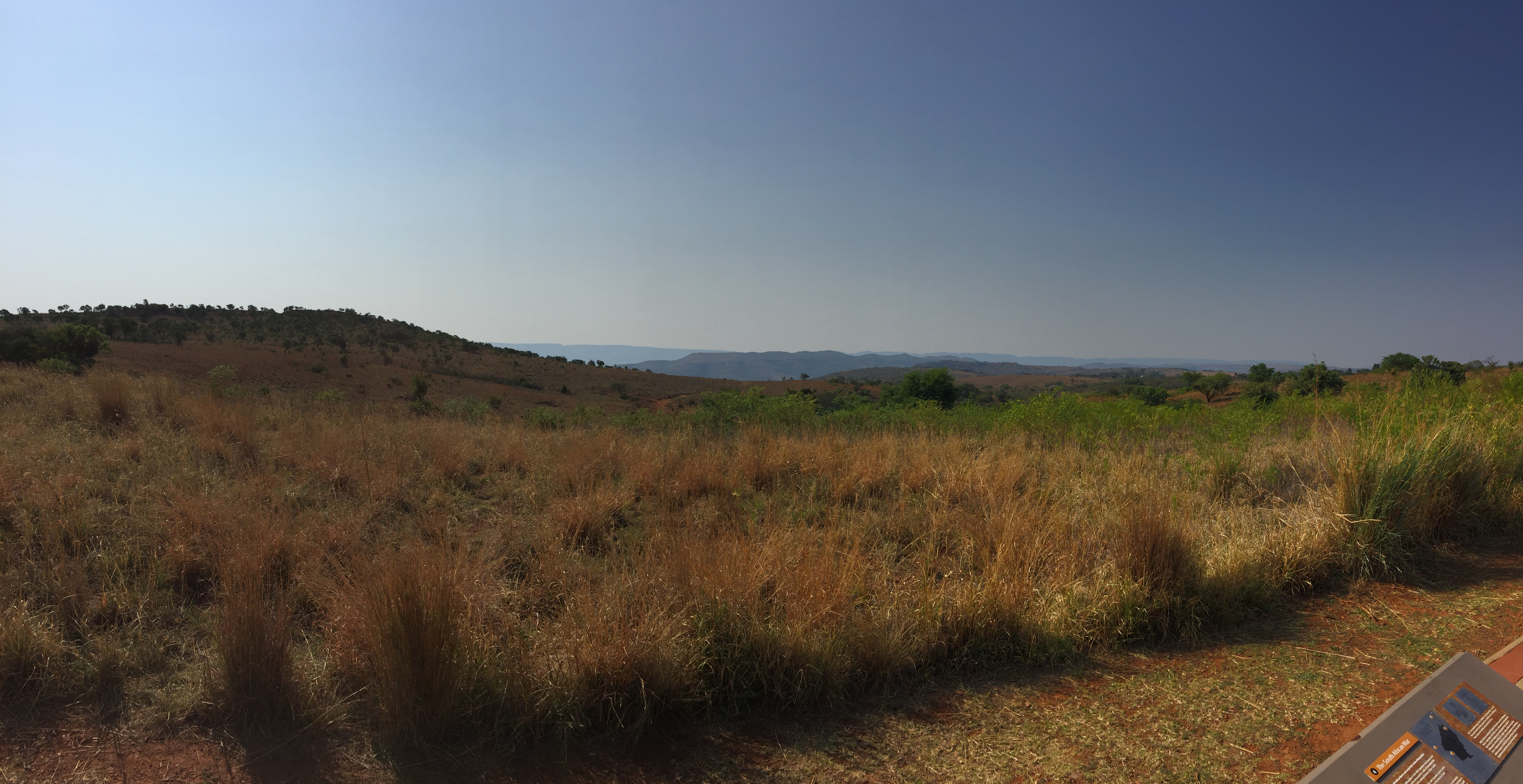
The grassland environment of the Cradle of Humankind has not changed significantly since the time of Agapornis longipes.

Fossilized remains of Agapornis longipes have been discovered in three caves, namely the Kromdraai fossil site, Cooper's Cave and Swartkrans. These caves are situated within the UNESCO World Heritage Site of the Cradle of Humankind in South Africa, so named because this area bears fossils of early hominins spanning from the Late Pliocene to Late Pleistocene epochs. However, in spite of extensive searches, specimens of this lovebird have not been recorded from localities other than the aforementioned three caves. The environment that A. longipes inhabited was similar to the savanna and veld grasslands of modern South Africa. Living in the Cradle of Humankind, the species lived alongside a wide variety of other animals, including the hominins Paranthropus and Homo. Because the environment of A. longipes has not changed significantly, it is likely that the bird was driven to extinction by microclimatic changes or the extinction of a food source rather than a change in the general environment.

=== Kromdraai ===
Specimens of A. longipes were first discovered in Kromdraai, but the exact stratigraphic unit from which they originate is unclear. The stratigraphy of Kromdraai was revised in 2022, when the fossil-bearing units of the site were assigned letters, with "Unit A" being the youngest and "Unit O" being the oldest. Fossils excavated before 2014 (including the A. longipes specimens) therefore cannot be easily compared with this modern stratigraphy and their exact age is uncertain. However, the Kromdraai A. longipes specimens have been broadly considered to represent individuals which lived about 2.5 million years ago, near the boundary of the Pliocene and Pleistocene epochs. Study of the fossil assemblage at Kromdraai suggests the area had an open, semi-arid grassland habitat differing little from the current environment. The area would also have had a rocky outcrop or cliff over 10 meters high, as evidenced by the fact that the most abundant bird species in the Kromdraai fossil assemblage, the bald ibis Geronticus thackerayi, would have been a rock-dwelling animal that had a breeding colony in this area. This rocky structure was likely influenced by erosion from a large stream or river, and the presence of a water body is further supported by the fact that fossils of ducks belonging to the genus Anas are represented. A gallery forest would have flanked this water body, as evidenced by fossils of forest-dwelling birds such as the black sparrowhawk (Astur melanoleucus) and a green pigeon of the genus Treron, and some particular species such as the pygmy owl Glaucidium ireneae and a roller of the genus Coracias would have required tree cavities to nest in.

A wide variety of animals known from the Kromdraai fossil assemblage, including hominins such as Paranthropus robustus and an early species of Homo. The large herbivores of this ecosystem are represented by a range of bovids, with the most numerous being the wildebeest Connochaetes taurinus prognu, while other bovid fossils from Kromdraai include those of the common eland (Taurotragus oryx), the oribi (Ourebia ourebi), Numidocapra crassicornis and a species of Megalotragus. The mammalian carnivores represented in this fossil assemblage include mustelids such as the African clawless otter (Aonyx capensis), honey badger (Mellivora capensis) and the small weasel Propoecilogale bolti, hyenas such as the brown hyena (Parahyaena brunnea), striped hyena (Hyaena hyaena) and an early aardwolf (Proteles amplidentus), felids such as Dinofelis barlowi, Megantereon whitei and the leopard (Panthera pardus), canids such as the black-backed jackal (Lupulella mesomelas), Cape fox (Vulpes chama) and a species of Lycaon, and civets such as the African civet (Civettictis civetta) and Civettictis braini.

=== Swartkrans ===
In Swartkrans, fossils of A. longipes have been uncovered from the Lower Bank of Member 1, the oldest of the fossil-bearing deposits in this cave. Use of the isochron dating method has shown that the Member 1 deposits were formed about 2.22 million years ago during the Early Pleistocene epoch, making the A. longipes remains from this site geologically younger than those at Kromdraai. Analysis of the faunal assemblage suggests that the Swartkrans fauna originates from a mosaic of habitats made up largely of veld grassland with riparian woodland. The landscape might have comprised a succession from riverine grassland with some acacia trees, to bushy hillsides, and finally to plains with open woodland. Minimum temperatures were slightly higher than today. Annual rainfall was likely between 310–550 mm (12–22 in), less than the modern annual rainfall of 650 mm (26 in), and there may have been a slight shift in the rainy season, with less rain in summer and more in winter compared to today.

The Lower Bank deposits at Swartkrans have preserved remains of many different animals which would have coexisted with A. longipes. As with Kromdraai, the most famous of these are the hominins, which include Paranthropus robustus and an early Homo species. Other primate fossils from the Lower Bank include those of the monkeys Theropithecus oswaldi, Dinopithecus ingens and Cercopithecoides williamsi. The majority of the large herbivores in this environment were bovids, with extant species such as the springbok (Antidorcas marsupialis), klipspringer (Oreotragus oreotragus), steenbok (Raphicerus campestris) and rhebok (Pelea capreolus) living alongside prehistoric taxa such as Antidorcas bondi and a species of Megalotragus, though equids such as Equus capensis and Hipparion lybicum were also present. Carnivoran fossils are also abundant in the Lower Bank, mostly representing extant species such as the lion (Panthera leo), leopard (Panthera pardus), African wildcat (Felis lybica), brown hyena (Parahyaena brunnea), black-backed jackal (Lupulella mesomelas), Egyptian mongoose (Herpestes ichneumon) and African clawless otter (Aonyx capensis), though there are also extinct species such as the hyena Chasmaporthetes nitidula. Other mammals represented in this fossil assemblage include the hyraxes Procavia antiqua and Procavia transvaalensis, the aardvark (Orycteropus afer), a springhare belonging to the genus Pedetes, and a pangolin of the genus Manis.

=== Cooper's Cave ===
Cooper's Cave is an extensive system and includes multiple distinct localities which have produced fossils, with the A. longipes specimens originating from a locality known as Cooper's D. Uranium-lead dating conducted in 2009 suggests that the Cooper's D deposits are approximately 1.5 to 1.4 million years old, while a more recent study from 2019 refined that estimate to an age of about 1.38 million years, dating to the Early Pleistocene epoch. Though geologically younger, the fossil assemblage at Cooper's D suggests an environment similar to that at Kromdraai, with open savanna being the dominant habitat, while rocky outcrops and woodland were also present. However, while rock-dwelling species made up most of the birds in Kromdraai, Cooper's D instead preserves more open grassland birds and almost no water-associated birds, suggesting that the environment had gradually become drier and more open by the time the Cooper's D deposits formed.

At Cooper's D, by far the most abundant birds in the fossil assemblage were francolins (Francolinus sp.), which are open grassland birds and support the idea that this environment was dominated by savanna. Other birds in this assemblage include extant birds such as the western barn owl (Tyto alba), the harlequin quail (Coturnix delegorguei), the black sparrowhawk (Astur melanoleucus), the Ludwig's bustard (Neotis ludwigii). Some of the present bird remains belong to extant genera, such as a buttonquail of the genus Turnix, a swift of the genus Apus, a guineafowl of the genus Numida, two falcons of the genus Falco, and a vulture of the genus Gyps, though it cannot be determined exactly which species they are. Extinct species such as the crow Corvus bragai and the pygmy owl Glaucidium ireneae are also represented, as are indeterminate remains attributed to the families Accipitridae, Scolopacidae, Sturnidae, Coliidae and Otididae. Mammal fossils are also abundant at Cooper's D, with among the most famous being those of the early hominin Paranthropus robustus, though non-hominin primates such as Gorgopithecus, Theropithecus and Papio are also represented. Bovids are also well-represented, with remains of both modern species such as the greater kudu (Tragelaphus strepsiceros), common eland (Tragelpahus oryx), and springbok (Antidorcas marsupialis), and those of extinct forms such as Antidorcas recki and Megalotragus having been found. Though rarer than the bovids, fossils of equids such as Equus capensis and Eurygnathohippus cornelianus are also known from Cooper's D. The apex predators in this ecosystem were large felids of the genera Dinofelis, Megantereon, Panthera and Acinonyx, as well as hyenas including the brown hyena (Parahyaena brunnea), striped hyena (Hyaena hyaena), Crocuta ultra and Chasmaporthetes nitidula. Smaller carnivores at Cooper's D include felids of the genera Felis and Caracal, the mustelids Propoecilogale bolti and the honey badger (Mellivora capensis), and mongooses such as the Egyptian mongoose (Herpestes ichneumon) and marsh mongoose (Atilax paludinosus).

== See also ==
- List of bird species described in the 2020s
