= Castle Lager =

South African brand of beer

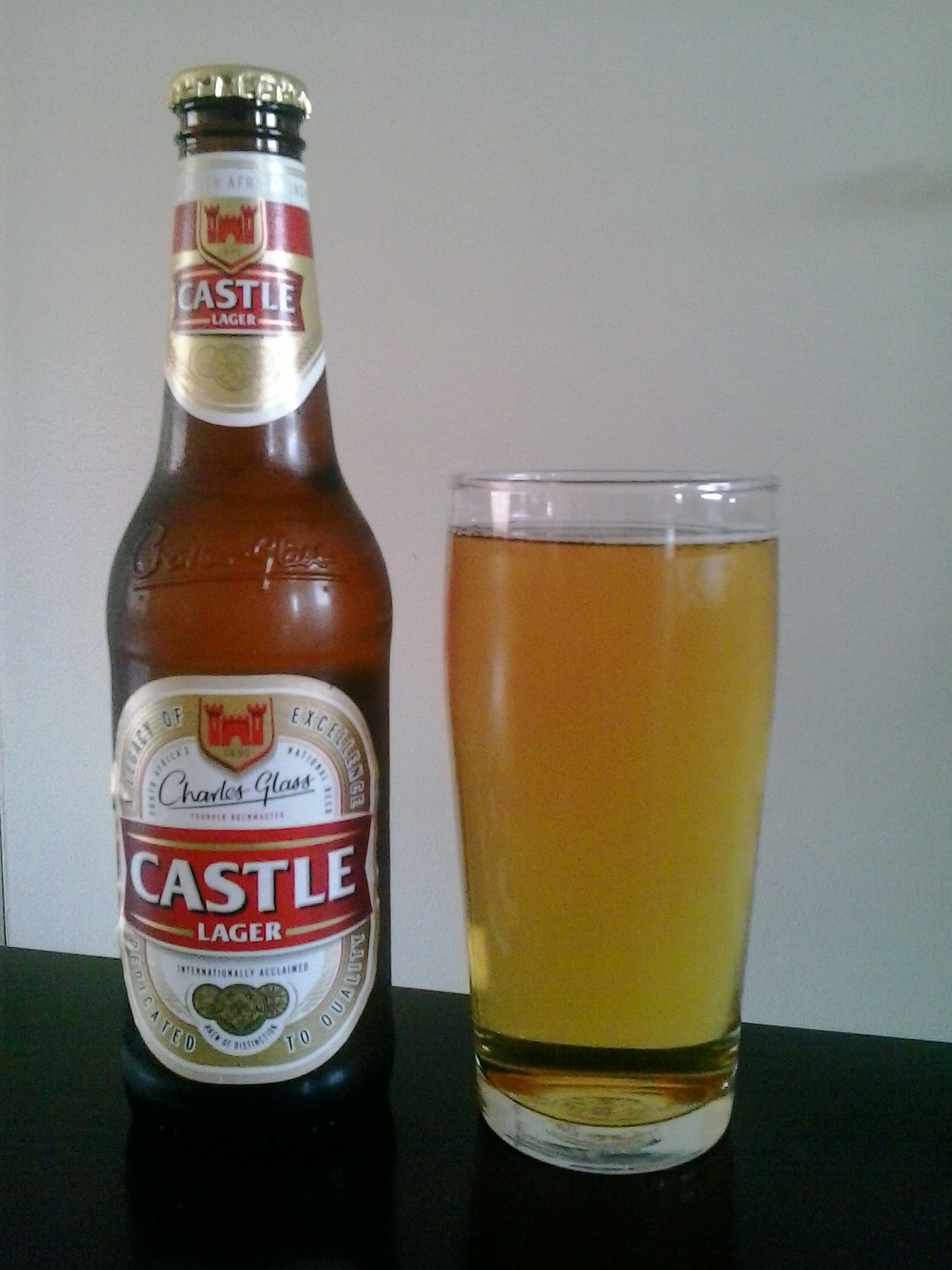
- Castle Lager
- Type: Pale lager
- Manufacturer: South African Breweries (AB InBev)
- Origin: South Africa
- Introduced: 1895 (under the SAB banner)
- Alcohol by volume: 5%
- Related products: Castle Lite, Castle Milk Stout
- Website: Official website

Castle Lager is a South African pale lager. It is the flagship product of South African Breweries. It is widely considered the 'national beer' of South Africa due to its widespread popularity and production within the country.

== History ==
Castle Lager's origins can be traced to the Johannesburg gold rush of 1886. Charles Glass, founder of the Castle Brewery, began selling beer to the miners after noticing a gap in the market. The new beer soon became popular amongst the prospectors of the gold rush, and in 1889 one of Johannesburg's early newspapers, The Digger's News, declared it "a phenomenal success." In 1895, on the success of Castle Lager, South African Breweries (SAB) was founded, with its head office being the Castle Brewery. Two years later, SAB became the first industrial company to list on the Johannesburg Stock Exchange. Today, Castle Lager is brewed in nine countries and is available in over 40 countries worldwide. In 2000 Castle Lager was awarded in the "World's Best Bottled Lager" category at the Brewing Industry International Awards.

In 2002, South African Breweries bought Miller, forming SABMiller. In 2016, Anheuser-Busch InBev acquired SABMiller.

== Sponsorships ==
Current Castle Lager sponsorships:

- Head Sponsor of The Rugby Championship in South Africa

Previous Castle Lager sponsorships:

- Premier Sponsor of the South African Football Team (Bafana Bafana).
- Team Sponsor of the South African Cricket Team (Castle Lager Proteas).
- Associate Sponsor of the South African Rugby Team (Springboks).
- Castle Free was the head sponsor of the South African Rugby Sevens Team (Blitzboks).
- Official beer supplier to the HSBC Sevens World Series Leg: Nelson Mandela Bay, South Africa.
- Official beer supplier to the Vodacom Super Rugby Tournament.
- Official beer supplier to the Premier Soccer League (PSL).

== Cold Castle Jazz Festival ==
In 1960, South African Breweries and Castle Lager sponsored the Cold Castle National Jazz Festival, held annually for four years. Major performers at the festival included The Jazz Epistles, Chris McGregor's Blue Notes, the Jazz Ambassadors, the Jazz Dazzlers, and Philip Tabane's Malombo. The 1962 edition of the festival, held at Moroka-Jabavu Stadium outside Johannesburg, represented the first open-air jazz fest on the continent.

The album Cold Castle National Jazz Festival 1962 (Gallo Record Company) included the work of key South African jazz artists, including Chris McGregor, Dudu Pukwana, Kippie Moeketsi, and Gideon Nxumalo. In 1963, Chris McGregor formed the Castle Lager Big Band, whose members included Kippie Moeketsi and Dollar Brand, and produced the seminal LP Jazz: The African Sound (Gallo Record Company) with the company's support.

== Related products ==
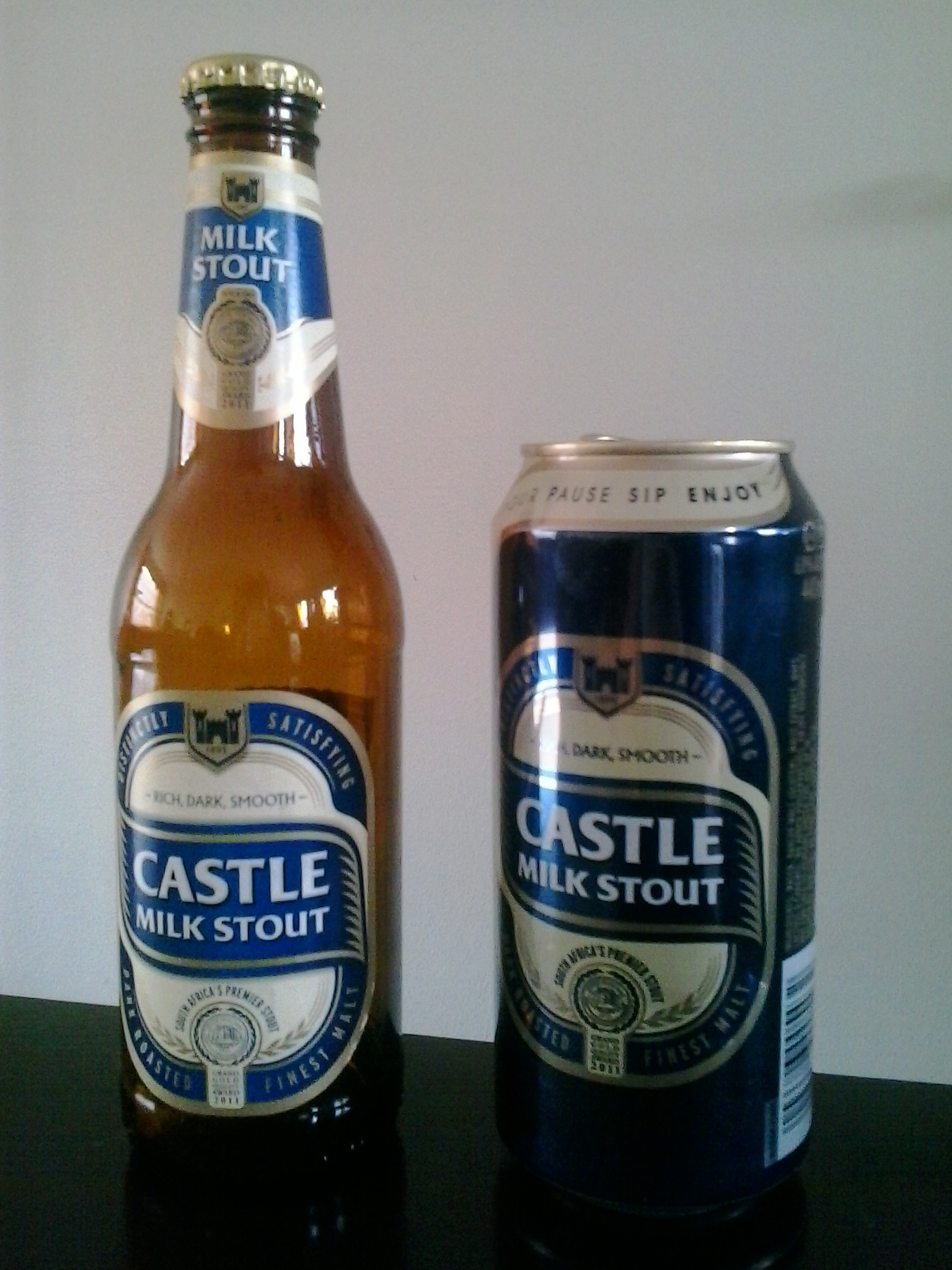
Castle Milk Stout

- Castle Lite - introduced in 1994, Castle Lite is a reduced alcohol and lower calorie variant of Castle Lager. It is sold in a green bottle (as opposed to Castle Lager's brown) and is also available in cans and draught. Castle Lite is lagered at -2.5 °C and is packaged with South Africa's first thermochromic temperature indicator. It has an alcohol by volume of 4%.
  - Castle Lite Lime - a Lime flavoured variant of Castle Lite introduced in 2014.
- Castle Milk Stout - a milk stout that is advertised as "South Africa's Premier Stout". Castle Milk Stout is the only beer that uses a dark roasted malt to extract a rich brew. The addition of caramel balances out the bitterness in an attempt to offer a more balanced taste. It has an ABV of 6%
  - Castle Milk Stout Chocolate Infused - a chocolate infused variant of Castle Milk Stout.
- Castle Free - a non-alcoholic beer introduced in 2017 and the first of its type to be produced in South Africa.
- Castle Double Malt - a pure malt lager introduced in 2021. It is said to have a rich, complex flavour, deep gold colour and creamy foam. It has an alcohol content of 4.8% by volume.

== See also ==
- Beer in South Africa
- SABMiller brands
