= Muldersdrift =

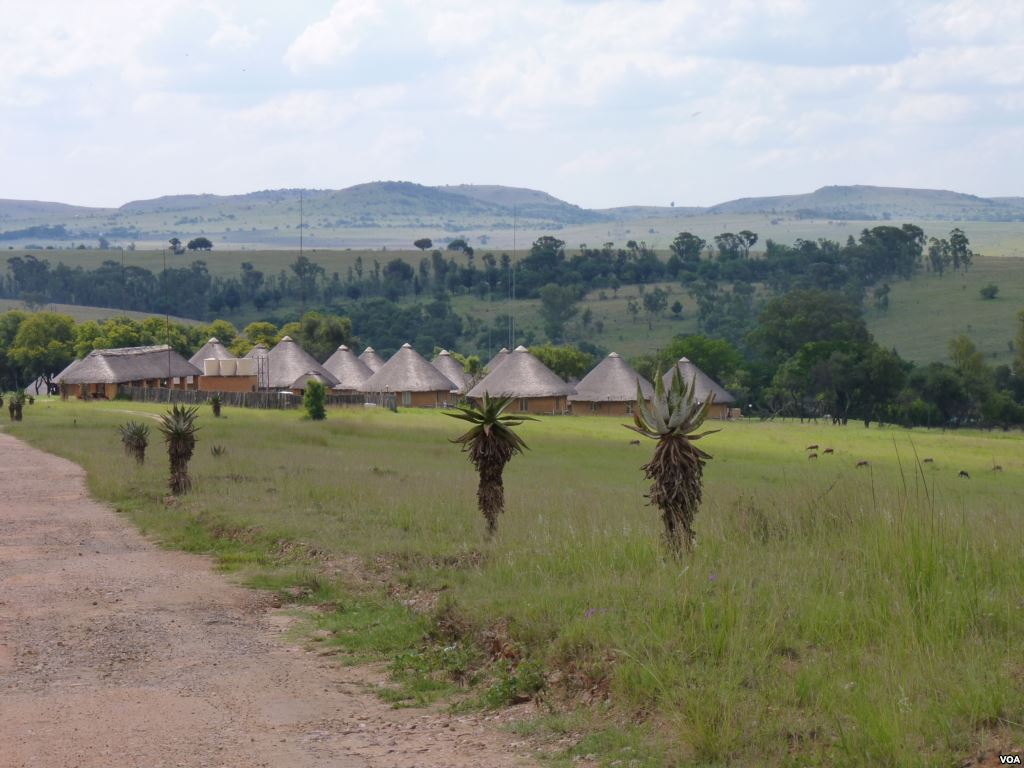
- Muldersdrift is home to a large hospitality industry

- Location within Gauteng Location within South Africa
- Coordinates: 26.033°S 27.85°E
- Country: South Africa
- Province: Gauteng
- District: West Rand
- Municipality: Mogale City
- Main Place: Krugersdorp

Area
  - Total: 4.66 km^{2} (1.80 sq mi)

Population (2011)
  - Total: 1,744
  - Density: 374/km^{2} (969/sq mi)

Racial makeup (2011)
  - Black African: 89.9%
  - Coloured: 0.9%
  - Indian/Asian: 0.2%
  - White: 9.1%

First languages (2011)
  - Tswana: 19.2%
  - Zulu: 15.1%
  - Sotho: 10.1%
  - English: 8.4%
  - Other: 47.1%
- Time zone: UTC+2 (SAST)
- Postal code (street): 1747
- PO box: 1739
- Area code: 011

Muldersdrift, in the Gauteng Province of South Africa, is a picturesque rural area situated 27 km north-west of Johannesburg, between Johannesburg and the Magaliesberg mountain range. The area falls under the West Rand District Municipality, and is part of the Mogale City Local Municipality.

Located in the Kromdraai Valley and on the Crocodile River, Muldersdrift forms part of the Crocodile Ramble, a scenic tourist route generally regarded as the most popular of all the craft routes around South Africa. Muldersdrift is the gateway to the West Rand, and forms part of Cradle of Humankind World Heritage Site.

== History ==
Muldersdrift is found on a drift, a ford offering a safe crossing point of the Crocodile River. The river crossing point was on an old wagon route that lead from Pretoria in the north-east to Potchefstroom in the south-west. The area was said to have been settled in 1840s as farmland and the area acquired its name in 1866 after the Mulder family when they camped close to the river when they were unable to across the drift due to flooding. The spot would soon become an outspan (resting spot) site for horse and oxen on the wagon route and would attract a postmaster long before the discovery of gold on the Witwatersrand.

== Places of interest ==
With its wealth of tourism establishments and more than 40 wedding venues and conference centres, It is often referred to as the "wedding capital" of Gauteng. Home to numerous small farms, smallholdings and nurseries, the area has acquired a reputation for being an arts and cultural hub with a number of home craft industries with a number of potters, artists, brewers, and astronomers based in the area.

The Wonder Cave near Muldersdrift is one of the show caves of the Cradle of Humankind World Heritage Site. It is the third largest cave in South Africa and one of the world's richest hominid fossil sites.

Muldersdrift is home to Gilroy's Brewery. Also situated in Muldersdrift is Gauteng's newest casino. The Silverstar Casino and Entertainment Centre contains a variety of restaurants, retail shops, conference facilities, a spa, and a 34-room hotel. Opened in October 2013, the 75,000 square metres (807,293 square feet) Cradlestone Mall is named after its proximity to the Cradle of Humankind.

== Crime ==
Violent crimes have increased during the 21st century in Muldersdrift. The estate manager of the Heia Safari Ranch in Muldersdrift, Paul Shulze, was shot dead in the area in 2013; his own former father-in-law, Franz Richter, was shot dead in 2007 on the same estate. Also in 2013, a local woman, Mrs Liesl Botha was attacked in the same house where her daughter Alyssa Botha had been brutally murdered several months earlier.

== See also ==
- Walter Sisulu National Botanical Garden
- Cradle of Humankind
- Lanseria International Airport
- Magaliesburg
- Hartbeespoort Dam
- Maropeng
- Sterkfontein Caves
- Wonder Cave
- Krugersdorp Game Reserve
- Lesedi Cultural Village
