= Gilroy's Brewery =

South African craft brewery and British-style eatery

- Founded: 2000
- Founders: Stephen Gilroy
- Headquarters: Muldersdrift, Gauteng, (Brewery and restaurant), South Africa
- Products: Beer, Restaurant, Beer garden
- Website: www.gilroybeers.co.za

Gilroy's Brewery is a microbrewery and restaurant in Muldersdrift, Gauteng, South Africa. The brewery was founded in 2000 by Stephen Gilroy at his pharmaceutical printing company in Roodepoort, Gauteng. Gilroy's Brewery was one of the first microbreweries in South Africa, along with Mitchell's Brewery, Nottingham Road Brewery, and Drayman's Brewery. In 2008 the operation was relocated to the current premises at Ngwenya Glass Village in Muldersdrift, where it expanded to include the restaurant, beer garden, and a gift shop. The brewery produces 5 styles of beer – a lager, pale ale, ruby ale, and a dark ale. The brewery has recently introduced a ginger beer.

Gilroy beer featured in the 2011 James Bond novel Carte Blanche, when the literary spy ordered a Gilroy Dark Ale whilst on assignment in Cape Town, South Africa. Speaking to the Krugersdorp News, the author, Jeffery Deaver, said, "A friend provided some "Serious" in Cape Town and I was hooked from the first sip! I included it in Carte Blanche because Bond insists on only the best!"

== History ==
Gilroy’s Brewery was established in the year 2000 by Stephen Gilroy at his pharmaceutical printing company in Roodepoort, Gauteng, South Africa. The Irish-born, Liverpudlian Stephen Gilroy immigrated to South Africa in 1970 and began home brewing. Having grown up in the United Kingdom, he was accustomed to a wide variety of ales and lagers. He found, however, that most of the beer produced in South Africa at the time was mass-produced lager. Stephen Gilroy had this to say, “When I came to South Africa I couldn’t drink the beer. I was used to the bigger [bodied] beers and they simply didn’t have it; it was just a sea of generic lagers. So I started home brewing." Journalist and managing editor of eNCA, Seamus Reynolds, described Stephen Gilroy as "the mad godfather of South African brewing" and described his personality as "part Monty Python, part Shakespeare, part David Attenborough."

Micro brewed beer has seen a large increase in popularity over the last decade, with over 100 microbreweries throughout South Africa (as of June 2015). Speaking as one of the pioneers of South African microbrewing, Stephen Gilroy believes that the demand for craft beer is part of a “global quest for authenticity in terms of what people eat and drink; a rebellion against artificial ingredients… Craft beer fits right into it because craft beer speaks of traditional values and for real beer. Craft beer is taking off now because people want bigger, more flavorful beers. They’re tired of drinking the same old generic lager, lager, lager that their fathers and their grandfathers used to drink.”

== Beer ==
Gilroy beers are brewed using a combination of three types of malted barley; pale malt for the base, and crystal and black malts for colour and flavour. The beers are naturally carbonated and contain no preservatives or artificial enhancers. Gilroy beers closely resemble English style beers in the fact that they should be consumed at cellar temperature, as opposed to freezing cold.

Lankwarden (2001, p. 51) featured Gilroy's beers. Gilroy beer is available on tap at the Gilroy pub in Muldersdrift. It is also bottled and packaged for distribution to the local market.

=== Lager ===
The Gilroy Premium Lager is a European style lager, brewed with imported malted barley and Czech Saaz hops, bottom fermenting lager yeast, and matured for up to 8 weeks.

=== Pale Ale ===
The Gilroy Favourite is an English style pale ale described by B. J. Lankwarden as a session beer due to its moderate alcohol content.

=== Ruby Ale ===
The Gilroy Traditional is an Irish style ruby ale with a pleasant nutty taste, brewed with crystal and black malt which give it its distinct colour.

=== Dark Ale ===
The Gilroy Serious is a dark ale, described by B. J. Lankwarden as “extremely well made and easy to drink, despite the high alcohol. A rare handcrafted masterpiece.” The Gilroy Serious was awarded a score of 9 out of 10 in the 2001 Diners Club publication, making it the highest rate beer in the southern hemisphere in that year.

=== Ginger Beer ===
The Gilroy Genuine ginger beer is brewed using a combination of four varieties of real ginger rhizomes, malted barley, sucrose, and ale yeast.

== Restaurant ==
The Gilroy Pub & Restaurant in Muldersdrift, 45 kilometres (28 mi) west of Johannesburg CBD, is a popular destination venue. The restaurant features live music and big screen sports in the beer garden. The “elegantly rustic” pub is in the British pub style, with promotional artwork hanging on the walls featuring vintage nudes. Stephen Gilroy recites original poems to the crowd in the beer garden on weekends, which often include social commentary and tongue-in-cheek criticisms of government.

Another popular attraction at the restaurant is the “Gilroy Beer Experience”. Here, Stephen Gilroy verbally explains to visitors the brewing process, beer culture, the history of Gilroy's Brewery, and the health benefits of drinking beer. The Africa Features correspondent of Voice of America, Darren Taylor, described Stephen Gilroy as “more of a standup comedian than a brewer.”

The restaurant features live jazz, with Stephen Gilroy playing guitar. Gilroy was a founding member of the 1970s South African hard rock band Suck.

== Awards and accolades ==
Gilroy's Brewery has won multiple local and international awards. At the West Rand Tourism Awards, hosted by the West Rand District Municipality, Gilroy's Brewery & Restaurant won the titles of "Best Restaurant" and "Best Tourism Experience" for four consecutive years from the years 2009 to 2012. In 2013, it won a "Sustainable Achievement" award for consistent achievement for 3 or more consecutive years. In 2015 the establishment won silver for Best Restaurant, and won the titles of "Best Tourism Product in the West Rand" and "Best Leisure Experience".

In 2012, Gilroy's Brewery was awarded the title of "Best British-stle Restaurant outside of Great Britain" in the visitor-rated "Best of British Awards", hosted by The Daily Telegraph newspaper.

== In popular culture ==
In the 2011 official James Bond novel Carte Blanche, the literary spy ordered a Gilroy Dark Ale (known as the Gilroy Serious) whilst on assignment in Cape Town, South Africa. Gilroy beer is mentioned again in chapter 50.

== See also ==
- Microbrewery
- Beer in South Africa
