= Kromdraai Conservancy =

Protected conservation park in South Africa

- Location within Gauteng
- Location: Gauteng, South Africa
- Nearest city: Krugersdorp, South Africa
- Coordinates: 25°55′45″S 27°47′20″E
- Area: less than 200 m
- Established: Incorporated in part into the Cradle of Humankind, 1998
- Governing body: Cradle of Humankind, Private Landowners and Conservancy

Kromdraai Conservancy is a protected conservation park located to the south-west of Gauteng province in north-east South Africa. It is in the Muldersdrift area not far from Krugersdorp.

== Etymology ==
Its name is derived from Afrikaans meaning "Crooked Turn" after a kink in the meandering Crocodile River.

== History ==
It was established to protect the caves, old gold mines, fossil sites, trout farm and a game reserve in the area. The caves in the area, known as the Sterkfontein caves have an extensive number of fossils and dolomite caverns. A well known fossil site is also named Kromdraai and it, along with such sites as Sterkfontein, Coopers, Swartkrans and Plovers Lake form part of the conservancy. Part of the Kromdraai conservancy also falls within the Cradle of Humankind World Heritage Site, proclaimed by UNESCO in 1998.

== Places of interest ==
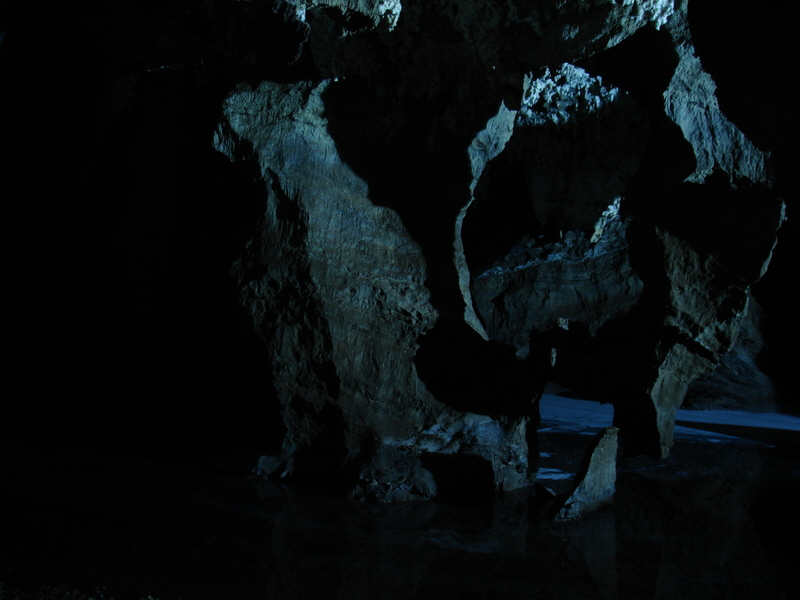
Sterkfontein caves

- Wonder Cave
- Sterkfontein

== See also ==
- Kromdraai, Limpopo
- Rhino and Lion Nature Reserve, Kromdraai
