= Suck (band) =

South African hard rock group

- Origin: South Africa
- Genres: Hard rock, progressive rock, psychedelic rock, heavy metal
- Years active: 1970–1971
- Labels: Parlophone
- Past members: Louis Joseph Forer; Stephen Gilroy; Saverio Grande; Andrew Ionnides

Suck were a rock band who were part of South Africa's first wave of hard rock titled "The Big Heavies". The group lasted eight months between 1970 and 1971, during which they recorded their only LP, Time to Suck. It was later released in America in 2009. Suck were also among the earliest groups to cover Black Sabbath. In March 2007, they were featured in an article in Classic Rock magazine titled "The Lost Pioneers of Heavy Metal", where they were referred to as "acidpunk metal".

== Discography ==
- Time to Suck (1971)
- "Aimless Lady" b/w "The Whip" (1971)
- Rock Today With the Big Heavies! (1972 – Suck contributed "War Pigs")

== Personnel ==
- Andrew Ioannides (South African citizen) – vocals, flute
- Stephen Gilroy (British citizen) – guitar
- Louis Forer (South African citizen) – bass
- Saverio Grande (Italian citizen) – drums
