= Beer in South Africa =

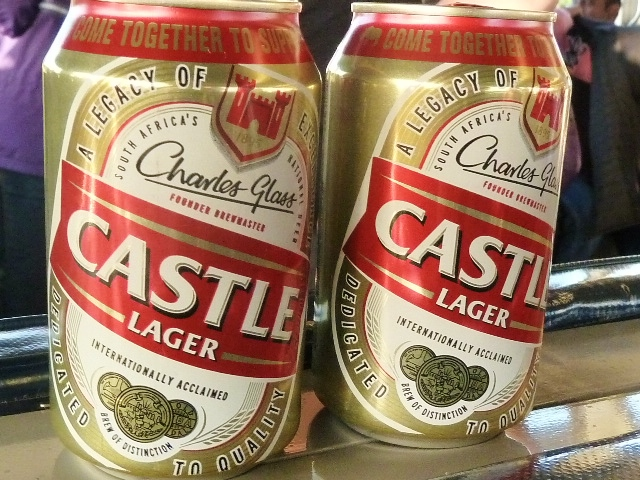
Castle Lager is one of South Africa's most popular beers made by South African Breweries

Beer in South Africa has a corporate history dating back to the early 20th century.

== History ==
South African beer has had two main influences on its development. Firstly, European settlers who colonised the country brought expertise and know-how as the country was populated. Dutch immigrants from the 1650s onwards and British immigrants during the 19th and 20th centuries contributed in different ways to the knowledge of alcohol production.

South African Western Beer

Beer reached South Africa with its first white settlers and has been brewed there for over 300 years. On October 4, 1658, Jan van Riebeeck recorded in his diary that the first beer was brewed at the Cape on this day. Beer is today still held in high regard as a wholesome natural beverage. In 1960 the Malan Liquor Commission completed its intensive investigations into the distribution of intoxicating liquor in South Africa and reported as follows: "The thought of the Commission underlying this report is that conditions should be created which would encourage the consumption of natural alcoholic beverages, preferably in conjunction with food, at the expense of stronger liquor or spirits. Greater differences in price between natural beverages and spirits and the easy availability of the former are recommended as part of the scheme aimed at diverting the drinking habits of the people in this direction." Dr. E. M. Jellinck, who was regarded as the world's leading research scientist in the field of alcohol studies, came to the following conclusion: "The type of beverage used is always revealing of drinking habits. Beer is a beverage selected, not by inebriates, but mainly by moderate users of alcohol."

Another critical but often overlooked influence has been indigenous knowledge. Local breweries operated by the black population, especially groups such as the Sotho, Zulu and Xhosa, have been brewing forms of sorghum beers long before any Europeans arrived.

Umqombothi, from the Nguni languages (Xhosa and Zulu), is a traditional beer made in the Transkei from maize (corn), maize malt, sorghum malt, yeast, and water.

Bantu beer

The brewing and consumption of Bantu beer played an important role in Bantu tribal life in Southern Africa. It is traditionally brewed by allowing a mixture of water and malted sorghum to ferment. The fermented product is only partially strained and thus retains a considerable percentage of solid matter. It is looked upon as both a food and a drink. In recent years commercially produced Bantu beer powders have replaced sorghum malt in home brewing and at smaller industrial breweries. Most municipalities enjoyed a monopoly on the production of Bantu beer in their areas, and the larger ones operated modern industrial plants. In the industrial production of Bantu beer, maize grits became the primary ingredient and were mixed with sorghum malt in a ratio of two to three parts of maize to one part of malt. Although most of the industrially produced Bantu beer is still sold in bulk, modern packaging in plastic and other types of containers was rapidly being introduced at most municipal breweries. Since the supply of European liquor to the Bantu was legalised in 1962, the sale of Bantu beer by municipalities started to increase faster.

European and Bantu beer have much in common. The latter is virtually the primitive forerunner of the former. In Leipzig, Germany, a centuries-old brewery is preserved as a tourist attraction, and its product is hard to distinguish from Bantu beer. It is not generally known that the nutritional value of European beer closely approximates that of Bantu beer. Both contain about the same percentage of alcohol, but in contrast, fermentation is terminated in the case of European beer by pasteurisation after bottling; it continues with Bantu beer until it turns 'sour'. The alcoholic content of Bantu beer increases after it leaves the brewery, and it is not unusual to find that it contains more alcohol than permitted by law, namely, 3% by weight or nearly 4% by volume. It was permitted by South African law of 1964 at that time.

Now, back in the 1960s, the South African Government decided to use the profits that accrue to municipalities from the production and sale of Bantu beer to plough back for the benefit of the Bantu communities in their respective designated areas. At that time the Apartheid Government built schools, libraries, clinics, four-room houses for the Black population of the land asthey were removing all African communities from their townhomes, e.g., Old Alberton North (Emagogogweni area) to townships, e.g., Katlehong, Thokoza, and Vosloorus areas (Katorus), far away from the European communities. They built all that using the Bantu Beer profits.

Bantu beer was produced at a cost of approximately 8 to 10 cents per gallon and sold from bulk at about 20 cents, leaving municipalities with a gross profit in the vicinity of 10 to 12 cents per gallon, of which 2 cents accrue to the Central Government as excise duty. When a gallon of European beer was sold through a municipal outlet for consumption on the premises, the following amounts accrue: (а) the State (as excise duty) - 80 cents; and (б) the Municipality (as a gross markup on sale) - 83 cents. Municipalities had to pay 80% of their net profit on selling European liquor to the Department of Bantu Administration for use in the development of Bantu homelands. From the purely fiscal angle, there was seen to be a strong case for encouraging the Bantu to drink more European beer because more significant amounts would become available for the government budget.

== Modern day ==
South Africa accounts for 34% of Africa's formal beer market and is expected to grow by 8–10% annually over the next five years. Beer consumption in the country was pegged at 60 litres per capita in 2012, greater than the 14.6-litre African average and the global average of 22 litres.

Today, South African Breweries (SAB) controls the vast majority of the South African beer market, and with the notable exception of imported brands such as Heineken, Guinness, and others, SAB owns and produces all the major brands in the country, as well as owning Miller's Genuine Draft (American) and long list of others which makes it the world's second-largest brewery. Their most popular and valuable brand is Carling Black Label, the most-awarded beer in the country with 20 prestigious international beer awards. They also produce Castle milk stout, Hansa Pilsner, Castle Lager, and Castle Lite. Other commonly drunk beers in South Africa is Windhoek Lager, a beer from Namibia made according to the Reinheitsgebot, as well as Tafel Lager, another Namibian import.

Jo'burg beer, an independent business and low-priced beverage, is dominant among lower-income groups and incorporates the tastes of traditional brewing.

Recent developments have seen an increase in South African Beer Tourism initiatives. Initiated by Beer Route, a collaboration of craft breweries in South Africa, other players have since come on board to help guide tourists to taprooms throughout the country. Around the same time, Kwazulu-Natal also had a local guided product named KZN Craft Revolution. Beer Tourism is a rapidly growing tourism sector, closely related in concept to Culinary tourism and is very similar to the concept of a Wine route.

=== Microbreweries ===
Some smaller microbreweries have sprung up in the past decades and tend to compete regionally. The country's first microbrewery was Mitchell's Brewery in Knysna. Mitchell's is now produced as a contract brand with Devil's Peak Brewing Company. As of 2019, 211 microbreweries produced 34 million litres of craft beer annually. Other microbreweries in South Africa include:

==== Eastern Cape ====
- Emerald Vale Brewing Company, Chintsa, Eastern Cape
- Little Brewery in Port Alfred, Eastern Cape
- Bridge Street Brewery in Port Elizabeth Eastern Cape
- Richmond Hill Brewing Co
- Table 58 Brewing Co
- The Hogsback Brewing Company

==== KwaZulu-Natal ====
- Clockwork Brewhouse
- East Coast Brewing Co. in Umkomaas
- Happy Days Brewery
- Nottingham Rd Brewing Company
- Shongweni Brewery
- That Brewing Co
- 1000 Hills Brewing Co.
- Mzelemu brewery
- Basset Breweries in Pennington

==== Gauteng and North West ====
- SMACK! Republic Brewing Co.
- Drayman's Brewery
- Gilroy’s Brewery
- De Garve Brewery
- Copperlake Breweries
- Black Horse Brewery
- Mogallywood
- The Cockpit Brewhouse
- Humanbrew (Loxton Lager)
- Leaky Tap Brewery
- The RedRock Brewing Company
- Legends Brewery
- Hazeldean Brewing Co
- Frontier Beer Co
- Agar's Brewery
- Brewhogs Microbrewery
- Irish Ale House
- Brauhaus Afrika, Rustenburg, North West Province
- Copperlake Brewery

==== Free State, Limpopo and Mpumalanga ====
- Clarens Brewery
- Dog and Fig Brewery
- Hops Hollow
- Stellar Brewery (Bloemfontein, Free State)
- Zwakala Brewery, Haenertsburg, Limpopo

==== Western Cape ====
The Western Cape province accounts for half of the beer microbreweries in South Africa.

- Afro Caribbean Brewing Co
- Aegir Project Independent Brewery
- Ukhamba Brewery
- Boston Breweries
- Devil's Peak Brewing Company
- Drifter Brewing Co.
- Jack Black
- Hopman Brewery
- Long Beach Brewery
- Red Sky Brew
- Shackleton Brewing Company
- Triggerfish Brewing
- Woodstock Brewery
- Birkenhead Brewery
- Cape Brewing Company
- Darling Brew
- Folk & Goode Brewing Co
- Hermanus Brewing Co
- Hey Joe Brewing Co
- Honingklip
- Frasers Folly
- Stellenbosch Brewing Company
- Old Potter's Inn
- Saggy Stone Brewing Company
- Berg River Brewery
- Noon Gun Brewery
- Cederberg Brewery

== Homebrewing culture ==
There is a reasonably large homebrewing community in the major metropolitan cities throughout the country. Homebrewers meet monthly in major cities, including Cape Town, Johannesburg, Port Elizabeth, Durban, and Bloemfontein. The leading clubs are the Wort Hogs (Gauteng), Southyeasters (Cape Town), Durban Homebrewers (Durban), Free State Fermenters (Bloemfontein), and the Helderberg Homebrew Club in Somerset West.

There are numerous national competitions held yearly. 2022 saw the inaugural bevPLUS Fools National Club Championship held at Fools and Fans 5 in the little town of Greyton in the Western Cape. Clubs from across the country competed against each other in an official BJCP competition to be crowned the best club in the country. Helderberg Homebrew Club took home the trophy for their excellent interpretation of the classic style; an English IPA.

Other notable competitions are Nationals, Powwow, and Fools National Club Championship, and various clubs holding league competitions.

== See also ==
- Beer and breweries by region
