= Plovers Lake =

Paleontological cave site in Gauteng, South Africa

Plovers Lake Fossil Site, Cradle of Humankind
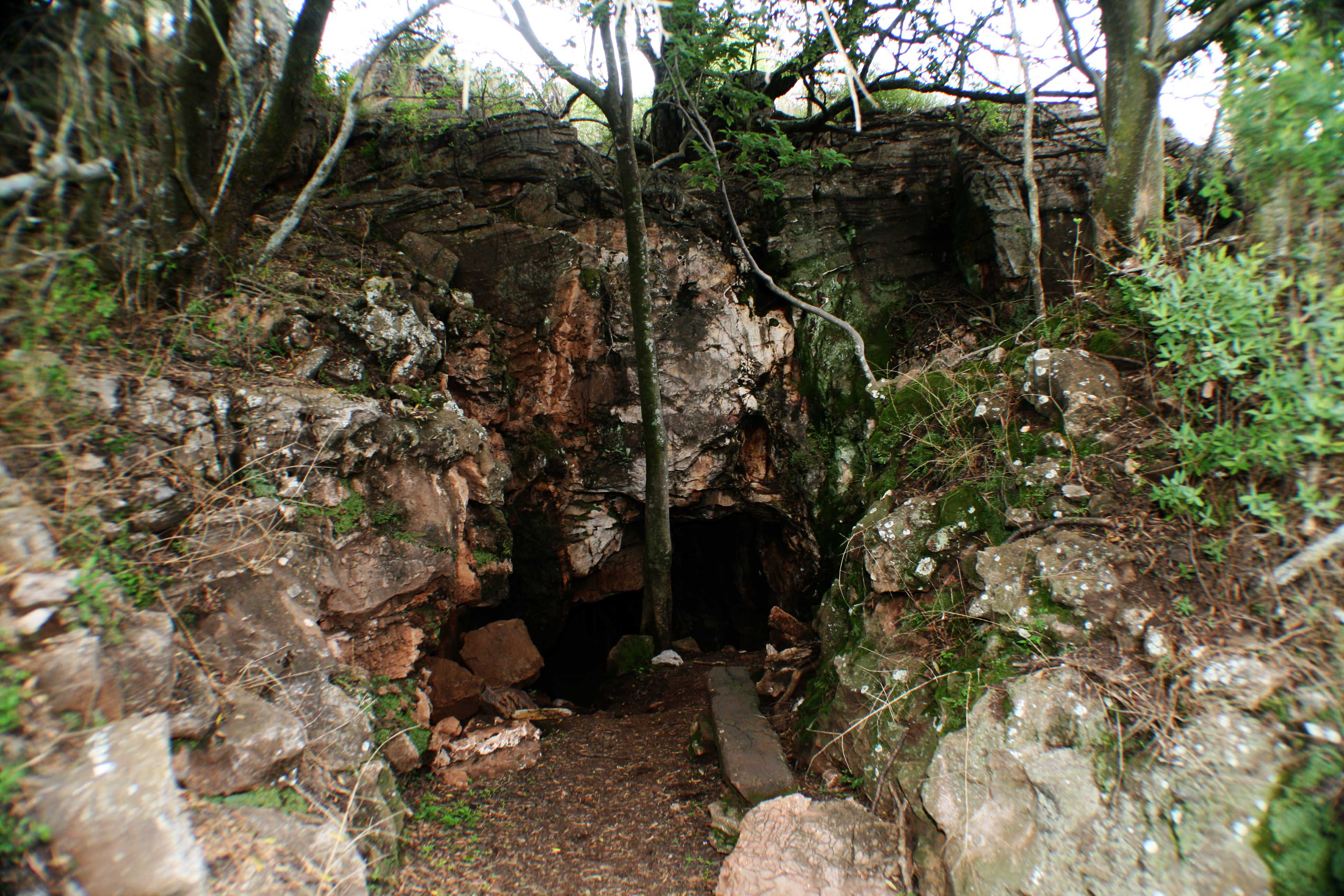
- Plovers Lake cave entrance

- Location within Gauteng Location within South Africa
- Location: Gauteng, South Africa
- Nearest city: Krugersdorp, South Africa
- Coordinates: 25°58′39″S 27°46′36″E
- Established: Incorporated into the Cradle of Humankind (1999)
- Governing body: Cradle of Humankind and Private Landowner

Plovers Lake Cave is a fossil-bearing breccia-filled cavity in South Africa. The cave is located about 4 km southeast of the well-known South African hominid-bearing sites of Sterkfontein and Kromdraai and about 36 km northwest of Johannesburg. Plovers Lake has been declared a South African National Heritage Site.

== History of investigations ==
Plovers Lake had two periods of excavation: one in the late 1980s and early 1990s by C.K. "Bob" Brain and Francis Thackeray of the Transvaal Museum (now known as the Northern Flagship Institute) in the "Outer Deposits", and the second by Lee Berger of the University of the Witwatersrand and Steve Churchill of Duke University between 2000 and 2004 in the "Inner Deposits".

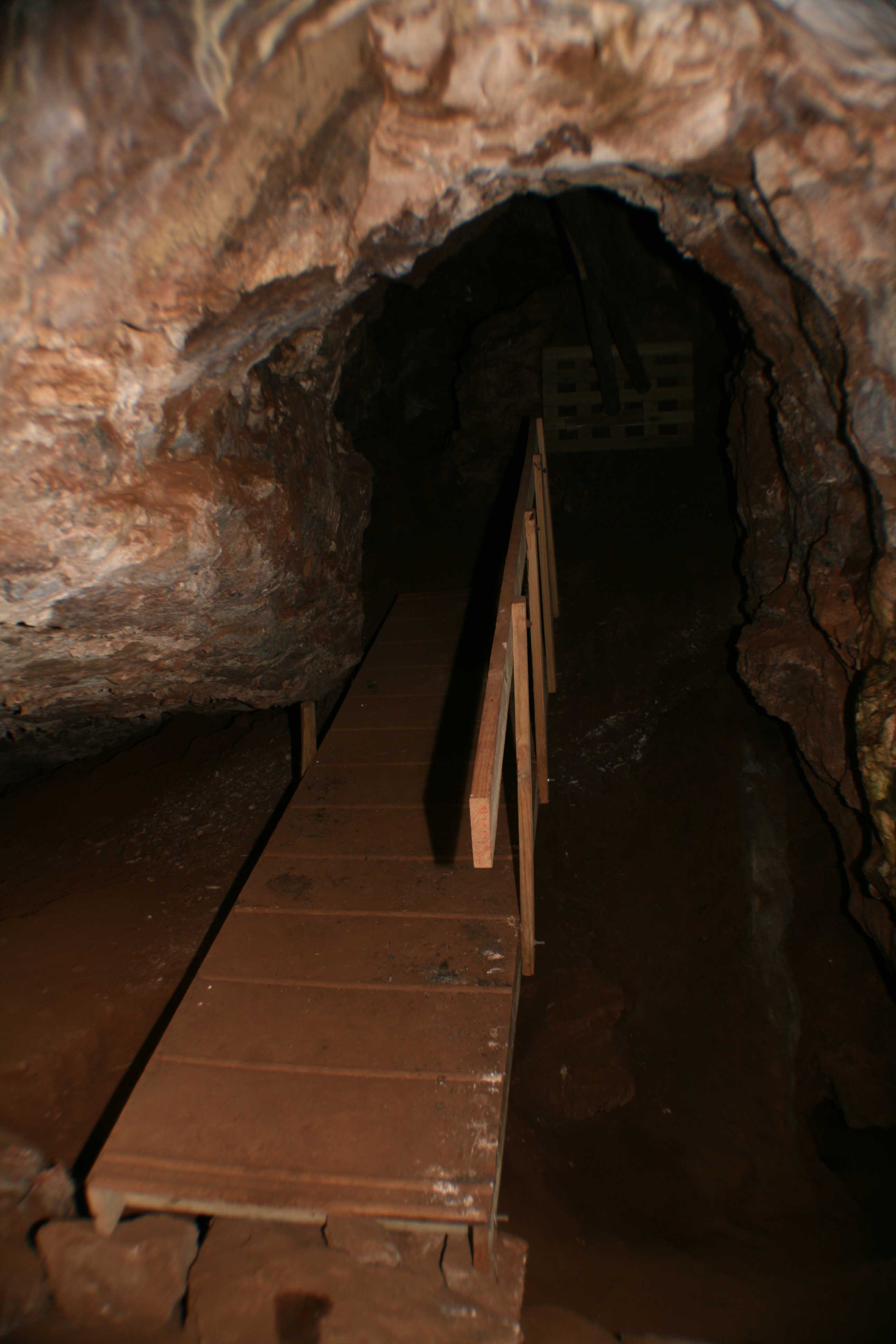
A view of the internal deposits and walkway at Plovers Lake

== Recovered fossils ==
Thousands of fossils were found by both teams. In the Outer Deposits, Brain and Thakeray discovered a very fine fossil baboon that had survived a leopard or saber-toothed cat attack, as evidenced by a healed wound over the eye. They also discovered many other animals and some indeterminate stone tools. No hominid fossils were discovered.

Berger and Churchill worked in the Inner Deposits and quickly discovered that this site was younger than the Outer Deposits and contained the remains of Middle Stone Age occupation by humans. They recovered over 25,000 fossil remains, many hundreds of tools including knives and spear points and fragmentary hominid remains dated to around 70,000 years ago.

=== Geology ===
Plovers Lake is a large series of deposits formed along huge fissures in a checkerboard pattern. The Outer Deposit is a breccia-filled dolomitic cave that has been de-roofed. The Inner Deposits have most of the roof intact and extend for several hundred meters. Most of the site has not been excavated.

==== Age of the deposits ====
The Outer Deposits have been dated to around 1.0 million years old based on the size of porcupines recovered. The Inner Deposits have been dated to greater than 70,000 years using radiometric techniques.

== See also ==
- Hominids
- List of fossil sites
- Lee Berger
- Cradle of Humankind
