= Time to Suck =

Studio album by Suck
- Released: 1971
- Recorded: EMI Studios, Johannesburg
- Genre: Progressive rock, hard rock, psychedelic rock, heavy metal
- Length: 34:26; 41:44 (2001 reissue)
- Label: Parlophone
- Producer: Clive Calder, Julian Laxton

Time to Suck is the first and only album by the South African hard rock band Suck. Released in 1971, it was recorded at the EMI Studios in Johannesburg in six hours.

Other than the song "The Whip", a Suck original, all songs are covers of bands like King Crimson and Deep Purple.

An outtake from the session, a cover of "War Pigs" by Black Sabbath, was released on the compilation Rock Today with the Big Heavies! in 1972, alongside "Aimless Lady", "21st Century Schizoid Man" and "The Whip".

== Track list ==
No.	Title	Original artist	Length
1.	"Aimless Lady"	Grand Funk Railroad	3:18
2.	"21st Century Schizoid Man"	King Crimson	4:51
3.	"Season of the Witch"	Donovan	9:56
4.	"Sin's a Good Man's Brother"	Grand Funk Railroad	3:41
5.	"I'll Be Creeping"	Free	3:23
6.	"The Whip"	Suck	2:54
7.	"Into the Fire"	Deep Purple	3:21
8.	"Elegy"	Colosseum	3:02
9.	"War Pigs" (Bonus track on 2001 CD reissue)	Black Sabbath	7:18

"Aimless Lady" was released as a single in 1971, with "The Whip" on the B side. On the original, Megaphone, Shadoks and Sun King vinyl editions of Time to Suck, "Sin's a Good Man's Brother" begins side B. "I'll Be Creeping" begins Side B of the Manik release.

== Versions ==
The album was initially only released in South Africa. In the 1980s, French label Megaphone Records released a bootleg LP version of Time to Suck, featuring inverted colours on the cover art. The first official CD release came in 2001 in the band's home country on Fresh Music with the bonus track "War Pigs" (an unofficial CD release had been known to circulate since the late 1990s). In 2002, a German bootleg label called Progressive Line released its own CD version of Time to Suck. German label Shadoks reissued it in 2009 on CD and vinyl, the first vinyl issue of the album since 1970. The vinyl editions came with a 33 1/3 rpm 7" containing the track "War Pigs". In 2019, Time to Suck was reissued on LP by Greek label Manik Records, incorporating "War Pigs" into the tracklisting. Sun King, a European label specialising in reissues of obscure 1970s music, reissued the album on 1 April 2024, with "War Pigs" incorporated into the tracklisting as well.

== Personnel ==
- Andrew Ionnides – vocals, flute
- Stephen Gilroy – guitar
- Louis Forer – bass
- Saverio Grande – drums
