= Glaucidium ireneae =

Glaucidium ireneae Temporal range: Early Pleistocene, 2.5–1.38 Ma

Scientific classification
- Kingdom: Animalia
- Phylum: Chordata
- Class: Aves
- Order: Strigiformes
- Family: Strigidae
- Genus: Glaucidium
- Species: †G. ireneae

Binomial name
- †Glaucidium ireneae Pavia, 2020

Extinct species of owl

Glaucidium ireneae is an extinct species of pygmy owl that lived in what is now Gauteng, South Africa during the Early Pleistocene epoch, about 2.5–1.38 million years ago.

== Discovery and naming ==
In 2020, Italian ornithologist Marco Pavia published a study on fossilized bird remains found at the Kromdraai fossil site in Gauteng, South Africa, in which he reviewed over 800 specimens representing 25 different species from the site. Among these, Pavia noticed that some of the fossils kept in the Evolutionary Studies Institute at the University of the Witwatersrand represented a species of owl unknown to science. After comparisons with the bones of modern owls, he determined that this new species belonged in the genus Glaucidium, and gave it the scientific name Glaucidium ireneae. Pavia chose the specific name "ireneae" in honor of Italian ornithologist Irene Pellegrino, who specializes in the study of bird phylogeography, especially that of owlets. Pellegrino supported Pavia in his research and is also the mother of their daughter Clara. A complete right tarsometatarsus with the specimen number KW 7976 was designated as the holotype specimen of this species, and three other specimens were chosen as paratypes. In addition, Pavia attributed four other bones to G. ireneae. The discovery of this species marks the first definitive record of Glaucidium fossils in Africa, as an earlier diagnosis made in 1990 of a fossilized skull from Taung as that of a pearl-spotted owlet (G. perlatum) was only tentative.

Further remains of G. ireneae were later reported in 2022, when Pavia teamed up with fellow researchers Aurore Val, Lisa Carrera and Christine M. Steninger to publish another study on fossil birds, with this one being on those at Cooper's Cave, a fossil-bearing site near Kromdraai. This study found that an owl coracoid bone had been uncovered in the Cooper's D locality of the cave, and was nearly identical to a coracoid from Kromdraai that was designated as a paratype of G. ireneae.

== See also ==
- List of bird species described in the 2020s
