= Kromdraai, Limpopo =

Kromdraai
- Location within Limpopo Location within South Africa
- Coordinates: 24.827°S 29.478°E
- Country: South Africa
- Province: Limpopo
- District: Sekhukhune
- Municipality: Ephraim Mogale

Area
  - Total: 1.35 km^{2} (0.52 sq mi)

Population (2011)
  - Total: 1,655
  - Density: 1,230/km^{2} (3,180/sq mi)

Racial makeup (2011)
  - Black African: 99.9%
  - White: 0.1%

First languages (2011)
  - Northern Sotho: 95.8%
  - Zulu: 2.0%
  - Other: 2.2%
- Time zone: UTC+2 (SAST)
- Postal code (street): n/a
- PO box: n/a

Kromdraai is a town in Sekhukhune District Municipality in the Limpopo province of South Africa.

== See also ==
- Kromdraai Conservancy
- Kromdraai fossil site
