= Wonder Cave (Kromdraai, Gauteng) =

Cave in the Bothongo Rhino & Lion Nature Reserve

Bothongo WonderCave
- Location: Kromdraai, Gauteng, South Africa
- Coordinates: 25.9705675°S 27.7715235°E
- Website: Bothongo Rhino & Lion Nature Reserve - Bothongo WonderCave
- Wonder Cave (Kromdraai, Gauteng) (South Africa)

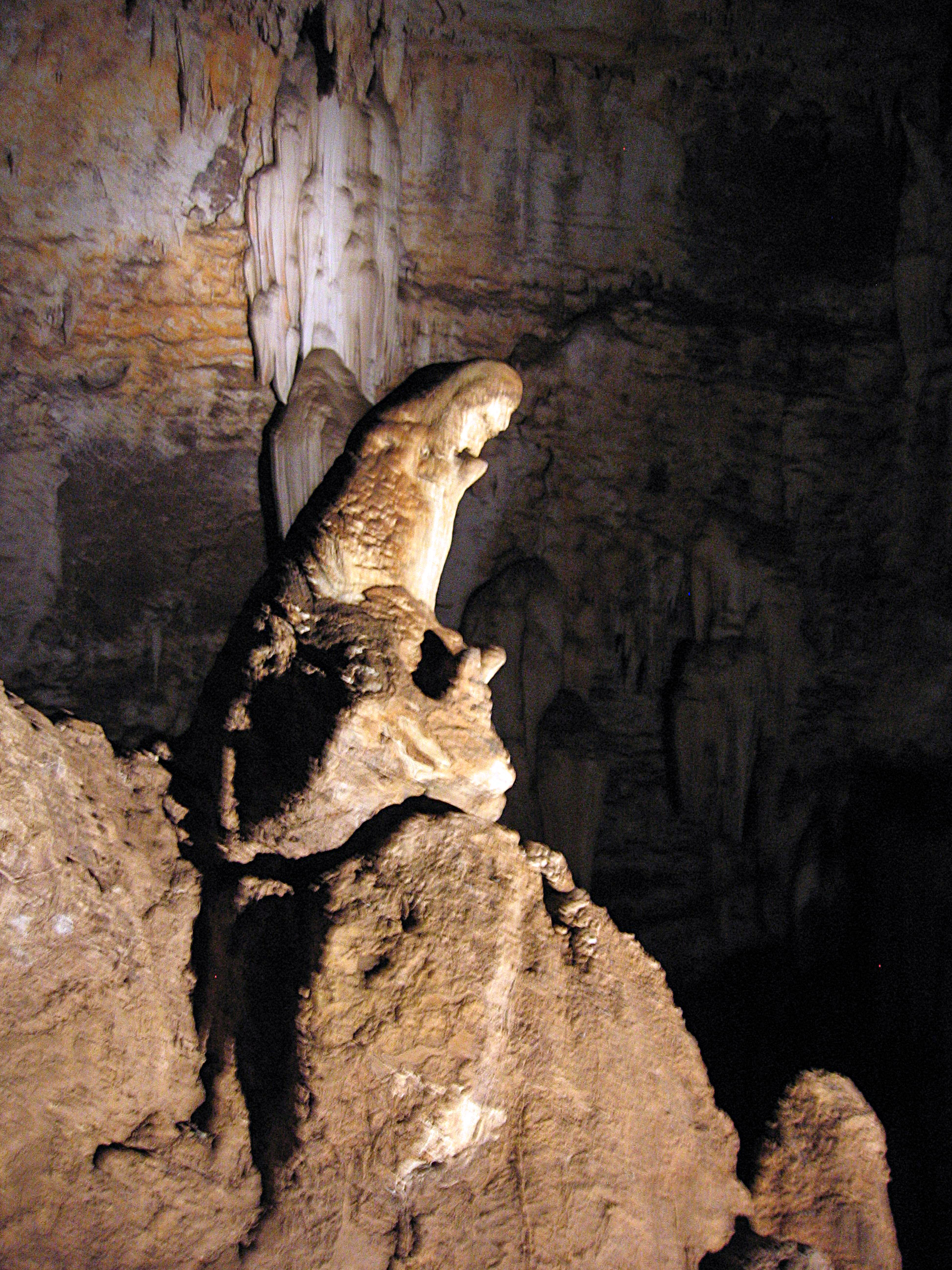
The "Praying Mary"

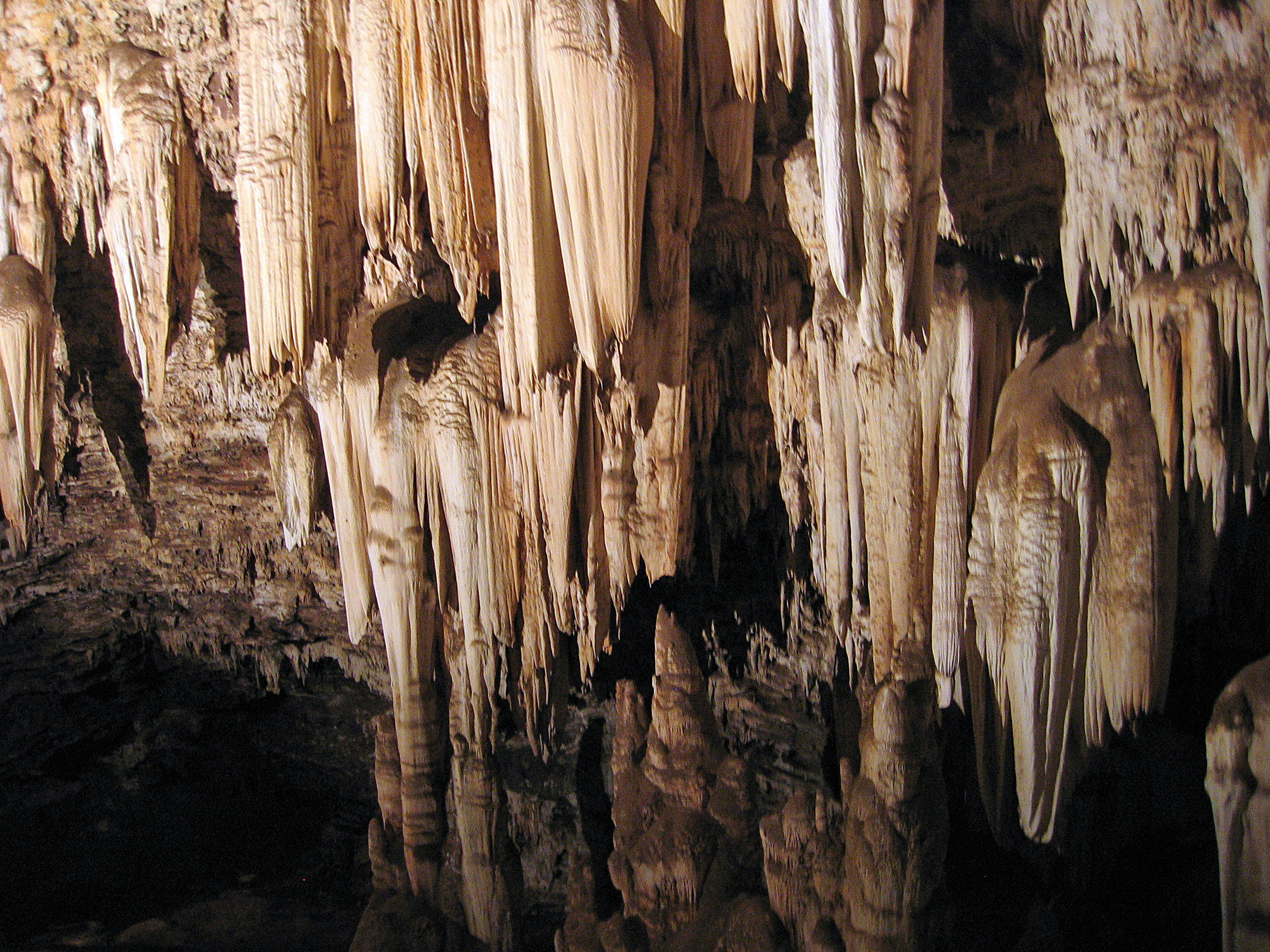
Stalactite and stalagmite formations in the Wonder Cave

The Bothongo WonderCave in Kromdraai, Gauteng, South Africa is situated within the Bothongo Rhino & Lion Nature Reserve in the Cradle of Humankind, a UNESCO World Heritage Site. The cave is the third-largest cave chamber in the country (behind the second largest, Sudwala Caves, and the largest, Cango Caves). It is 5-10 million years old. The single chamber has an area of 46,000 square metres (500,000 sq ft), and is 125 by 154 metres (410 by 505 ft).

It was discovered in the late nineteenth century by miners who dynamited and excavated limestone for the making of cement. Mining stopped during the Second Boer War and never resumed.

The cave has about 14 stalactite and stalagmite formations up to 15 metres high, 85% of which are still growing. The 60-metre-deep cave is accessible to visitors by elevator. The cave can be visited as an attraction on its own.

== See also ==
- Cradle of Humankind
- List of caves in South Africa
- Muldersdrift
