= Devil's Peak Brewing Company =

South African brewery

- Company type: Private
- Industry: Brewery
- Founded: 2012
- Headquarters: Cape Town, South Africa
- Key people: JC Steyn
- Website: devilspeak.beer

Devil's Peak Brewing Company is a South African brewery located at the base of Devil's Peak mountain in Cape Town, South Africa.

== Products ==
=== Founders series ===
The Kings Blockhouse IPA, named after a military blockhouse on Devils Peak, is the flagship IPA from Devils Peak Brewing Company. It is a hoppy, bitter and moderately strong India pale ale. It won "best beer on show" at the 2011, 2012 and 2014 Cape Town Festival of Beer and the 2014 Johannesburg Festival of Beer and was the winner of the 2014 SAB Craft Brewer Championship.

The First Light Golden Ale is named so because the eastern-facing slopes of Devils Peak are among the first to see the morning sunlight in Cape Town. The Woodhead Amber Ale has a slightly hoppier finish compared with other South African examples of this style. Its name was derived from the Woodhead Dam. The Silvertree Saison is a moderately bitter ale that was named after the endangered Silvertrees (Leucadendron argenteum).

=== Explorer series ===
With a slightly lower alcohol level, the Devil's Peak English Ale is designed to be a sessionable beer with lower levels of bitterness.

The American Pale Ale is based on the American West Coast Pale Ale.

=== Specialty series ===
Vannie Hout is a Brett-infused, barrel-aged farmhouse ale. It is kept for six months in Chardonnay and Pinot Noir wine barrels.

Vin de Saisson is a beer and wine hybrid that uses grape must (juice) during the brewing process. The regular Vin de Saisson Devils Peak put 20% Chenin Blanc into the brewing process.

== See also ==
- Beer in South Africa
- Microbrewery
- Barrel-aged beer
