= Clavicular facet of scapula =

Part of the shoulder blade

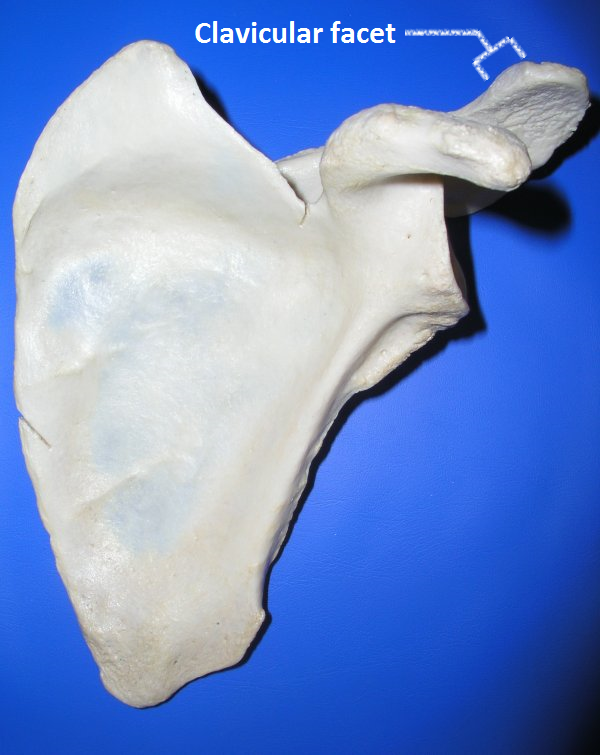
- Costal surface of left scapula. Clavicular facet labeled at top right.

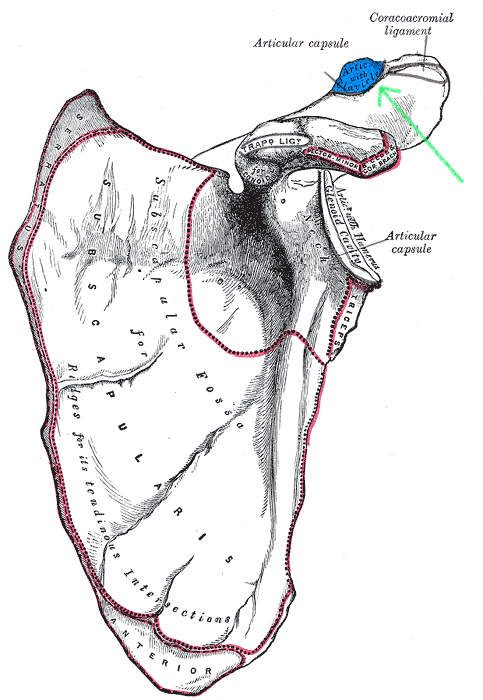
- Costal surface of left scapula. Clavicular facet is at the top right, labeled as "Artic with Clavicle".

Details

Identifiers
- Latin: Facies articularis clavicularis
- TA98: A02.4.01.010
- TA2: 1153
- FMA: 63568

Clavicular facet of scapula is small oval facet on the medial border of the acromion for articulation with the acromial facet on the lateral end of the clavicle. Also called Clavicular articular facet of acromion.

The coracoacromial ligament is attached near the clavicular facet.

== Additional images ==
Left scapula. Animation. Clavicular facet shown in red.

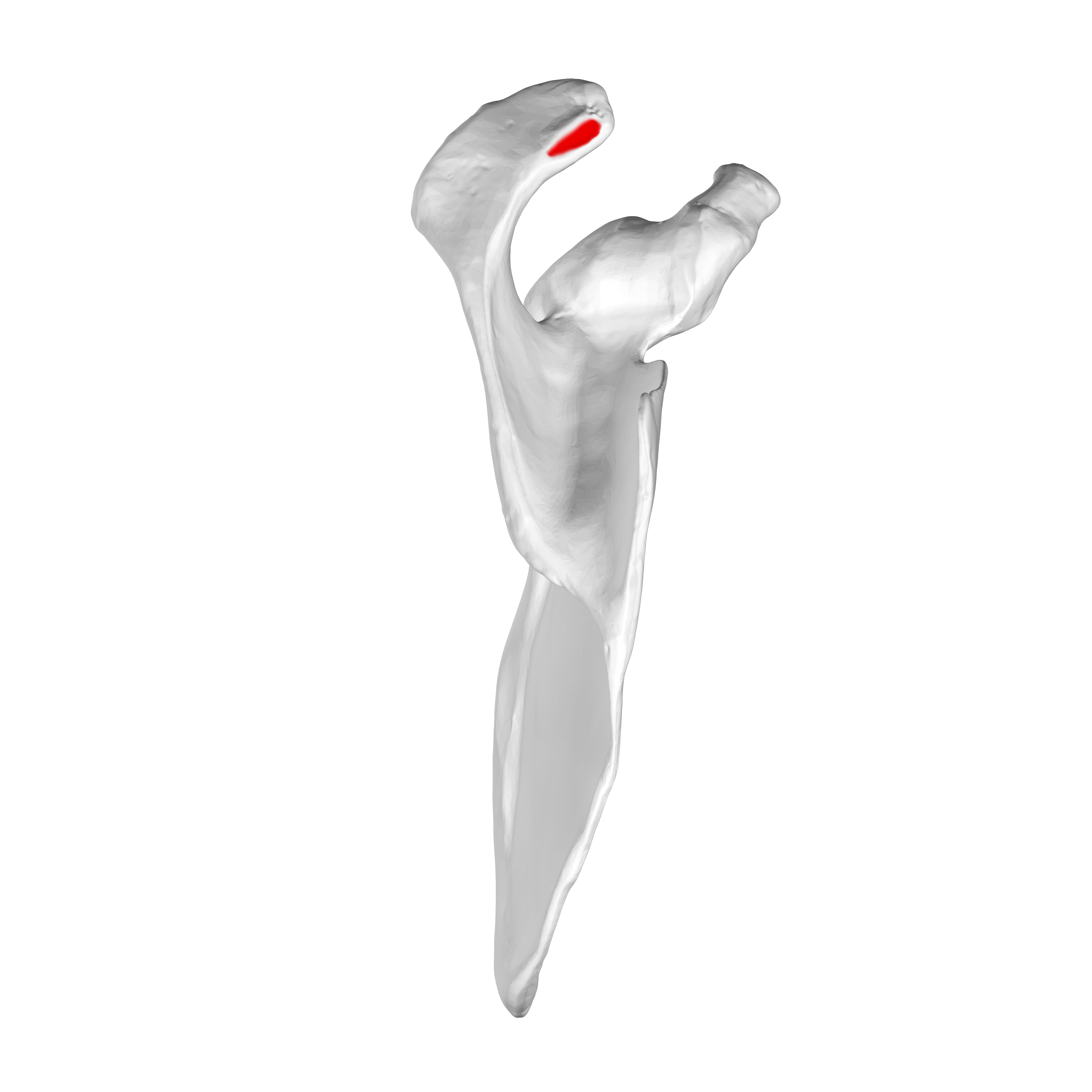
Medial top view. Clavicular facet shown in red.

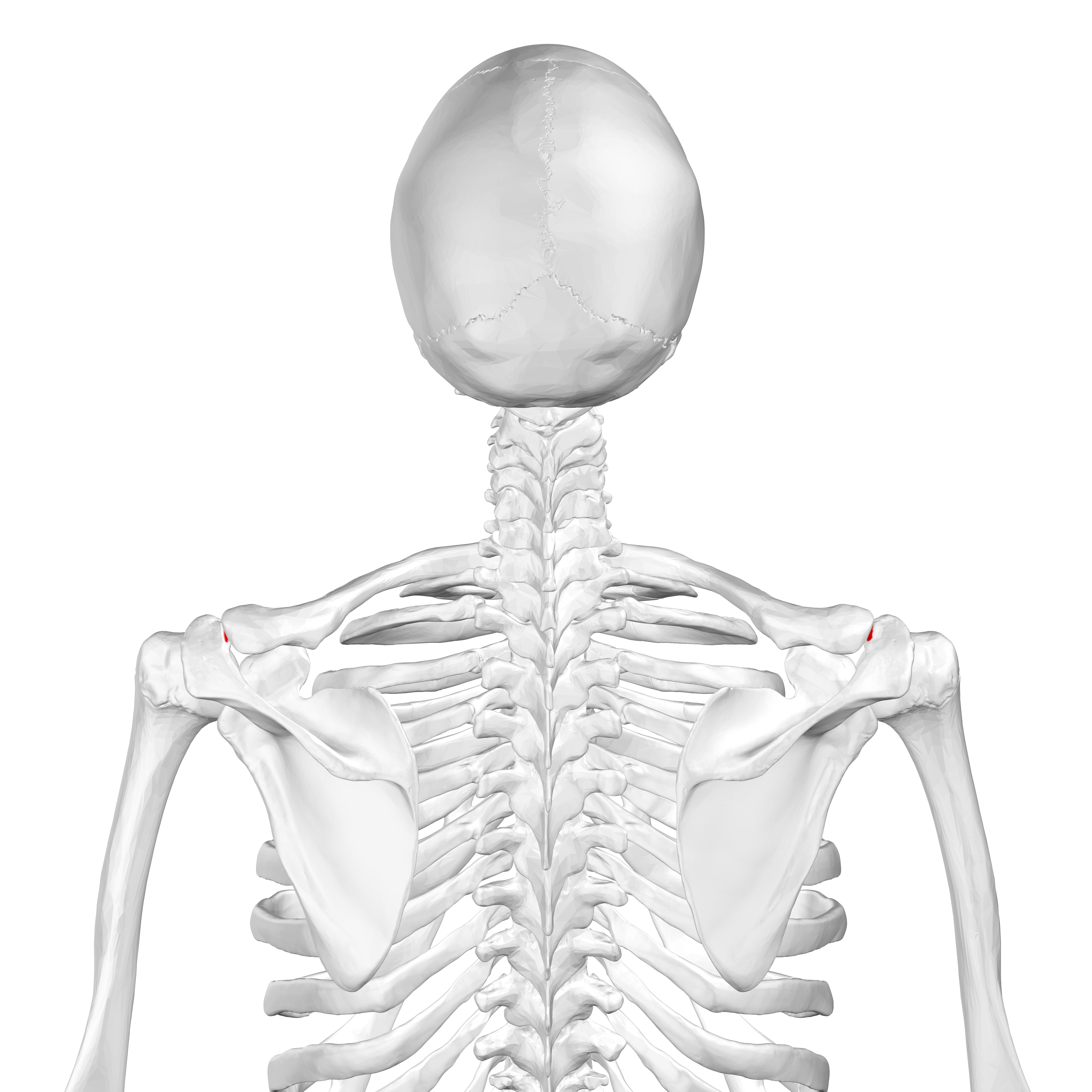
Posterior view. Clavicular facet shown in red (click the image to enlarge).

== Code ==
- TA code - A02.4.01.010
- FMA identifier - FMA 63568

== See also ==
- Acromion
- Clavicle
- Acromioclavicular joint
- Acromioclavicular ligament
- Separated shoulder
