= Philip Tabane =

South African musician, vocalist, jazz guitarist and band leader

- Born: 25 March 1934; South Africa
- Died: 18 May 2018 (aged 84) Pretoria, South Africa
- Genres: Jazz, South African music
- Occupations: Musician, singer
- Instrument: Guitar

Philip Tabane (25 March 1934 – 18 May 2018) was a South African musician, vocalist, jazz guitarist and band leader.

He was born in rural Ga Ramotshegoa northeast of Pretoria into a family of guitarists. His mother was a spiritual healer.

He led the group Malombo, sometimes also known as The Malombo Jazzmen, His music was heavily influenced by Sepedi chants and rhythms which are reputed to have spiritual healing powers. His chants invoked the powers of departed ancestors. His music was very popular among participants in the early years of the Black Consciousness Movement.

Tabane had significant international success and played with musicians of the calibre of Miles Davis and Herbie Hancock.

He died in Pretoria at the age of 84.

== Discography ==
- Castle Lager Jazz Festival 1964 - 1964
- The Indigenous Afro-Jazz Sounds Of Phillip Tabane and His Malombo Jazzmen — 1969
- Man Philly - 1986
- Philip Tabane & Malombo - 1988
- Unh! — 1989
- Silent Beauty - 1989
- Ke A Bereka - 1996
- Muvhango — 1998
- Live at the Market Theatre - 2010
