= Equus capensis =

Equus capensis Temporal range: Pleistocene

Scientific classification
- Kingdom: Animalia
- Phylum: Chordata
- Class: Mammalia
- Order: Perissodactyla
- Family: Equidae
- Genus: Equus
- Subgenus: Hippotigris
- Species: †E. capensis

Binomial name
- †Equus capensis Broom, 1909

Extinct species of zebra

Equus capensis, commonly referred to as the Giant Cape zebra, is an extinct species of zebra that roamed southern Africa with possible occurrences reaching to northeastern and Eastern Africa.

Fossils attributed to E. capensis range from the Early Pleistocene to the early Holocene. The taxa was first described by British-South African palaeontologist and professor of zoology Robert Broom in 1909 from fossil material found near Cape Town. Skeletal measurements suggest a height reaching up to 156 cm (61 in, or 5 feet) at the withers and 450 kg (992 lbs) in body mass.

The animal's taxonomic status has been debated. Mitochondrial DNA from specimens identified as E. capensis falls within the genetic diversity of the plains zebra, Equus quagga, although some researchers continue to recognize it as a distinct species.

E. capensis has often been interpreted as a grazer, but dental-wear evidence from the Elandsfontein archeological site suggests that its diet also included browse. Proposed explanations for its disappearance include environmental change, loss of coastal habitat following interglacial sea-level rise, and human predation, although the relative contributions of these factors remain debated.
