= Cooper's Cave =

Hominid fossil cave in Gauteng, South Africa

Cooper's Cave Fossil Site, Cradle of Humankind
- Location within Gauteng
- Location: Gauteng, South Africa
- Nearest city: Krugersdorp, South Africa
- Coordinates: 26°00′46″S 27°44′45″E
- Established: Incorporated into the Cradle of Humankind 1999
- Governing body: Cradle of Humankind and private landowner

Cooper's Cave is a series of fossil-bearing breccia filled cavities. The cave is located almost exactly between the well known South African hominid-bearing sites of Sterkfontein and Kromdraai and about 40 kilometres (25 mi) northwest of Johannesburg, South Africa and has been declared a South African National Heritage Site.

== History of investigations ==
Cooper's Cave is now recognised as the fifth richest hominid site in the Cradle of Humankind World Heritage Site (behind Sterkfontein, Swartkrans, Drimolen and Kromdraai) and one of the richest sites for early hominid stone tools of the Developed Olduwan culture. Excavations are still underway at Cooper's and are currently being directed by Christine Steininger and Lee Berger of the Institute for Human Evolution and the Bernard Price Institute for Palaeontological Research at the University of the Witwatersrand.

== Tools ==
Cooper's Cave has provided a rich tool assemblage that has been provisionally assigned to the Developed Olduwan. Cooper's is arguably the second richest early stone tool site in the Cradle of Humankind area.

== Geology ==
Cooper's is a series of breccia-filled dolomitic caves that formed in fissures along geological faults.

== Age of the deposits ==
Cooper's D has been dated by uranium-lead methods (Robyn Pickering, U. Melbourne) to between 1.5 and 1.4 million years ago. Cooper's A, based on the animals recovered, is thought to be about the same age.

== Gallery ==
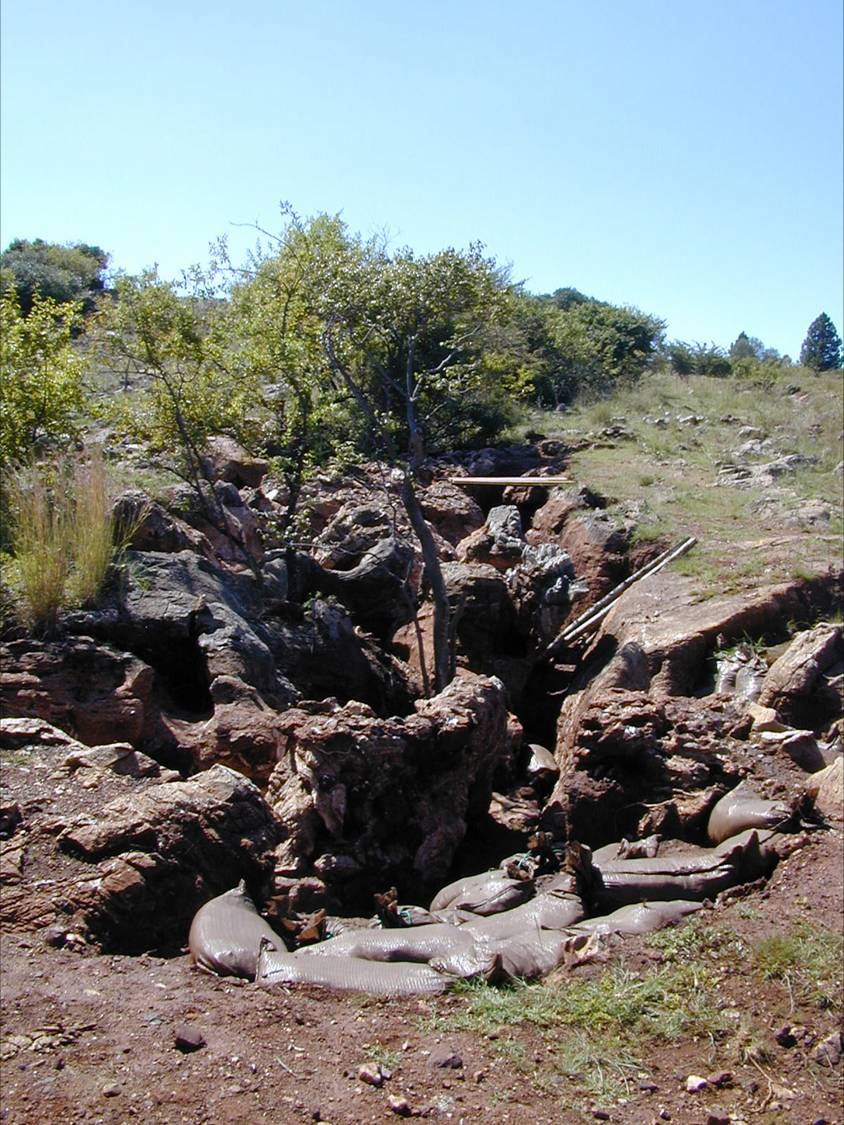
View of Cooper's D from West. Cooper's A is in the far background left of the pine tree

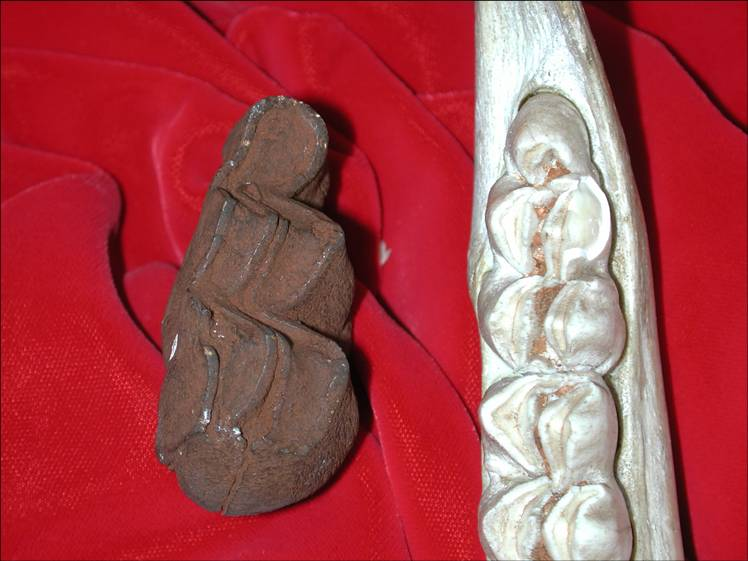
An extinct giant giraffe molar (left) from Coopers Cave compared in size to a large adult male giraffe tooth still in the mandible (right)

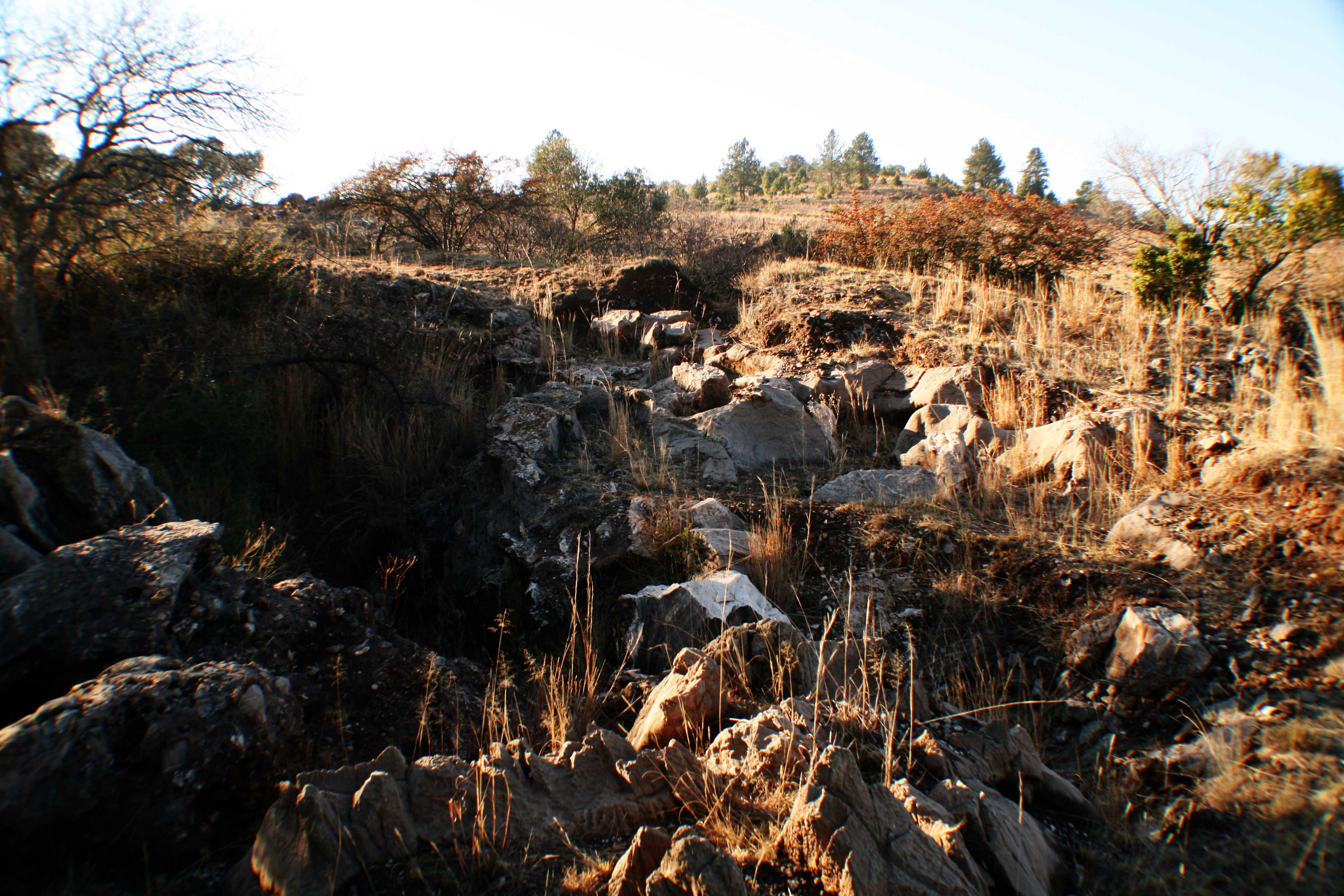
Coopers A viewed from the West

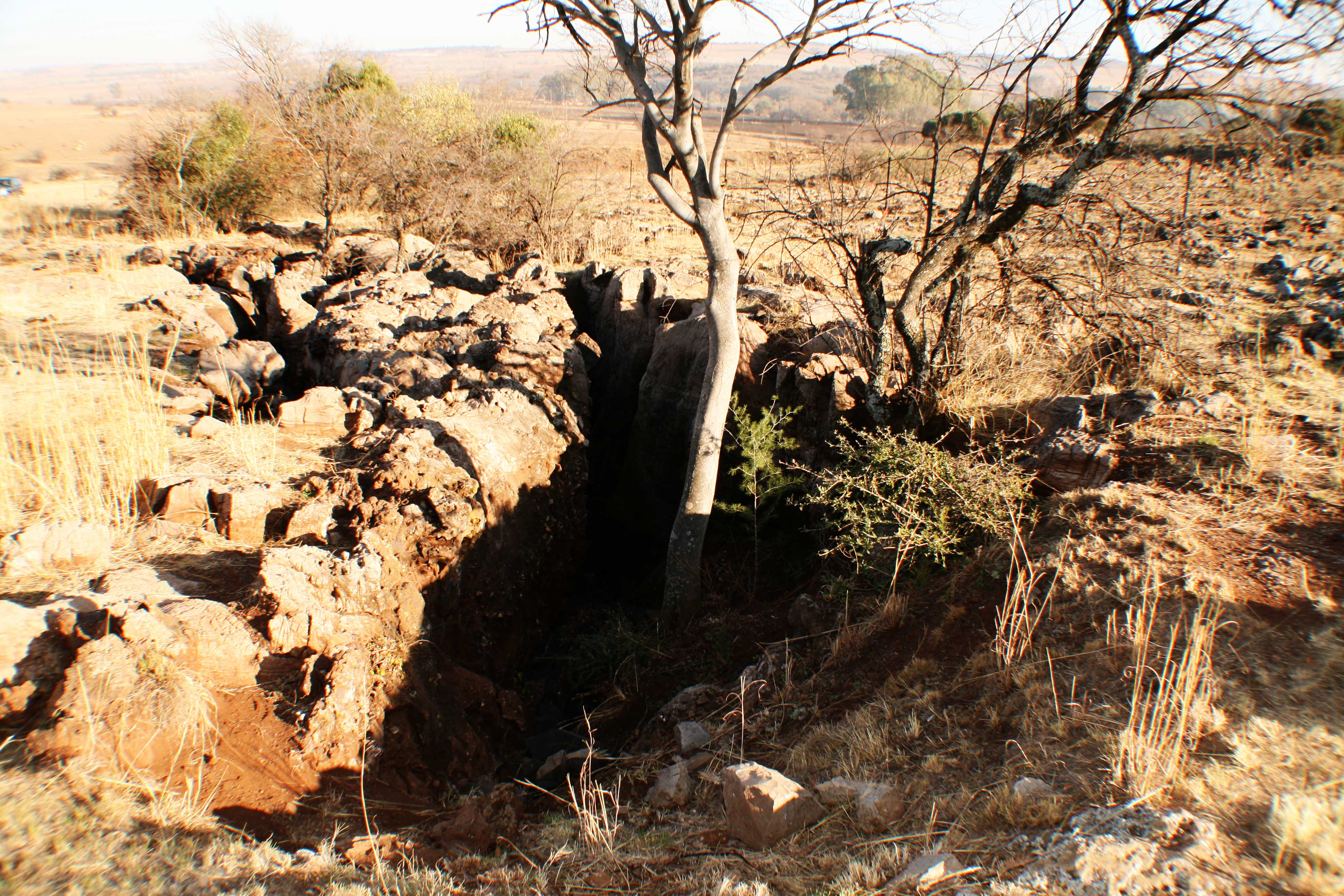
Coopers D from the East

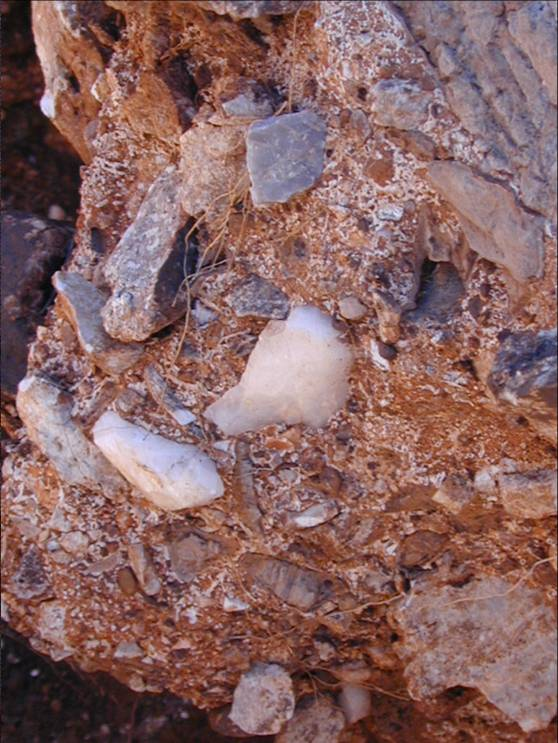
Quartz stone tools still encased in breccia at the Cooper's site

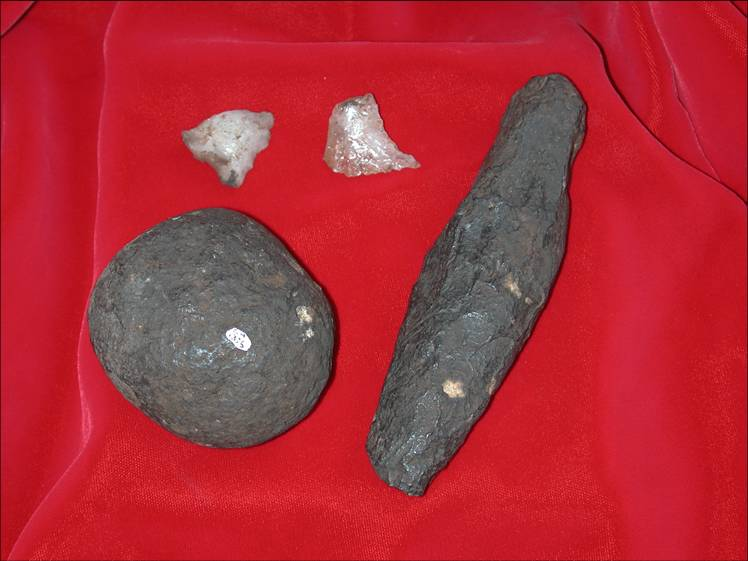
Stone tools of the Developed Olduwan from Cooper's D. Pictured are a hammerstone, an unknown object made of shale, and quartz flake tools

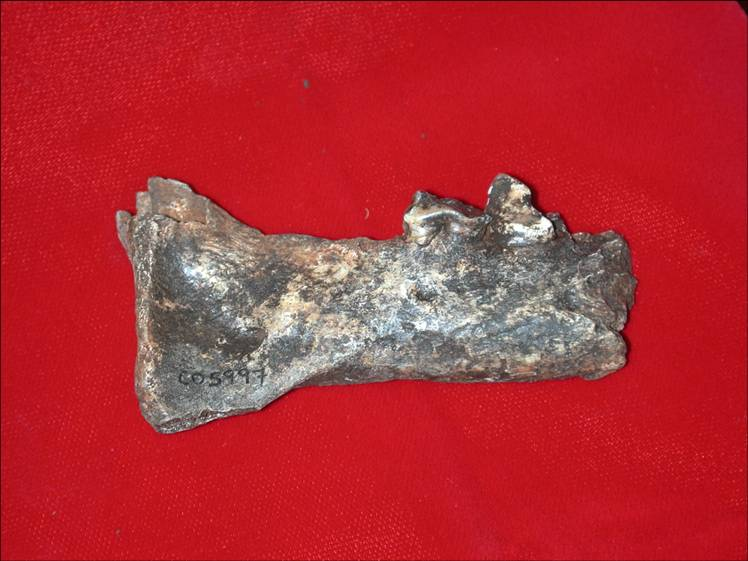
Megantereon jaw (A type of sabre-toothed cat) from Cooper's
