= Manuport =

Natural object displaced by humans

A manuport is a natural object that has been deliberately taken from its original environment and relocated without further modification. Typically moved by human hand, some manuports are the result of other hominins. Common manuports include stones, seashells and fossils, which has led archaeologists and anthropologists to conclude they must have been chosen for their beauty. This recognition of an object’s aesthetic character suggests that certain manuports represent some of the earliest examples of art.

== Etymology ==
The earliest attestation of the word manuport is from English in 1966. The term is derived from Latin and literally means "handcarried", from the words manu, 'by hand' (ablative of manus, 'hand'), and portatus, 'carried', from portare, 'to carry'. Compare manuscript, 'written by hand'.

== Notable manuports ==
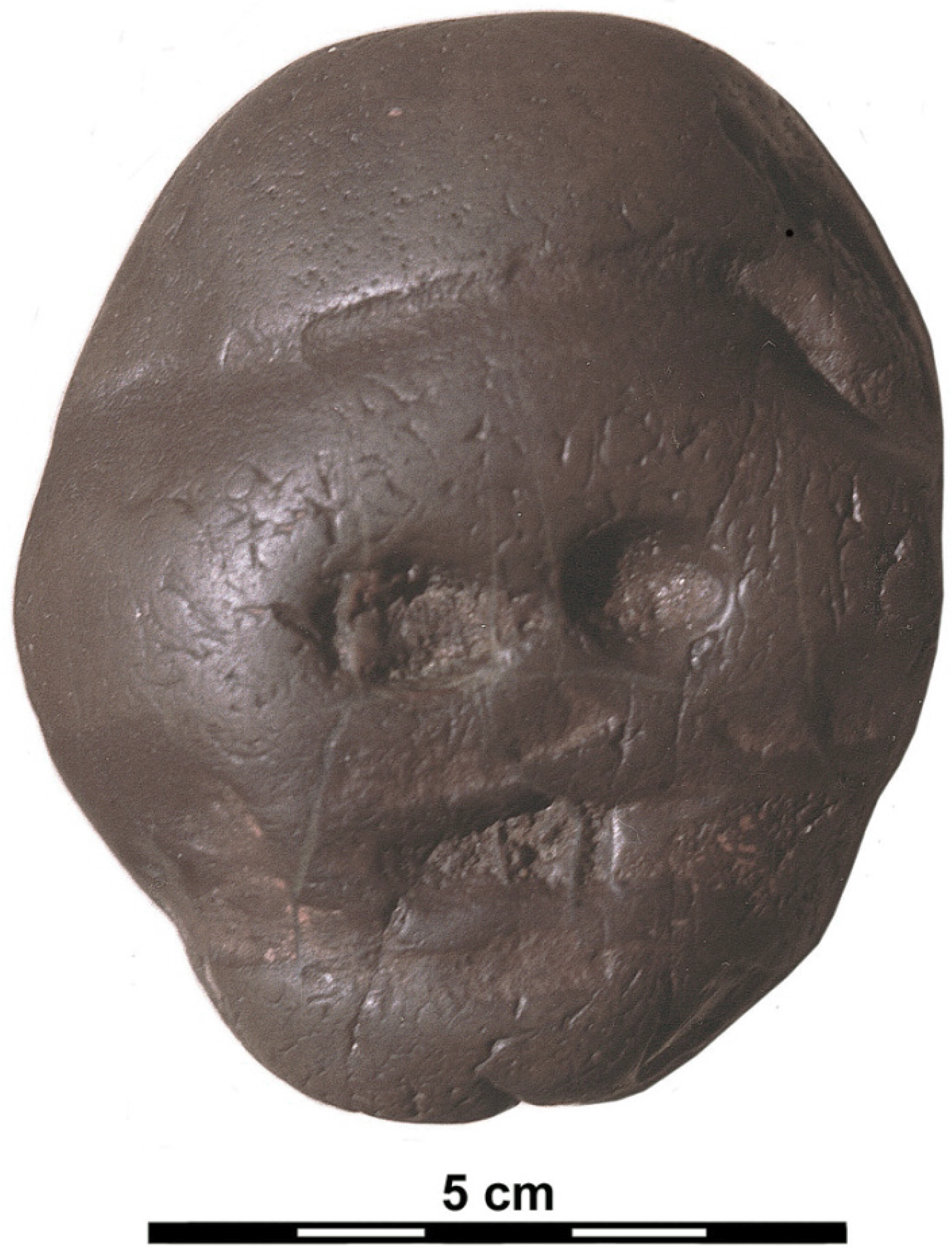
The Makapansgat cobble with its distinct 'face'.

=== Makapansgat cobble ===
The Makapansgat cobble was first discovered in the 1920s during excavations at an archaeological site in the Makapan Valley, South Africa. Although noted for its striking resemblance to a human face and its likely association with australopithecines, the cobble drew little attention at the time. (Only several years prior had the first description of Australopithecus been published and, as such, the cobble received no further study). As the field of evolutionary biology developed through the 20th century, aided by the discovery of further hominin species, it led to a renewed interest in the Makapansgat cobble.

Sedimentary analysis of the cave where the Makapansgat cobble was discovered, including the unearthing of a nearby Australopithecus africanus skeleton, dates the manuport to 2,000,000-3,000,000 BP. Jasperite, the principal mineral found in the cobble, is not found elsewhere in the cave, and the nearest deposit of jasperite is reportedly 32 km away. Robert G. Bednarik argues that the cobble must have, sometime around 2.95 million years ago, been picked up and “carried for a considerable distance” by an early hominin. The Makapansgat cobble is the oldest known manuport and is possibly the earliest example of symbolic thinking.

The Makapansgat cobble’s distinct ‘face’, with its pair of ‘eyes’ and a ‘mouth’, has led some researchers to conclude that the profile must have, at least partially, been carved by hand. However, current research suggests that the cobble’s ‘features’ are entirely the result of natural forces. During the Pliocene, the jasperite deposit that would become the Makapansgat cobble experienced serious geological stress that produced fractures, which were then later filled with silica. Typical forces of erosion then later wore the silica away, leaving the cobble’s ‘face’ mostly formed by the end of the Pliocene epoch.

=== Erfoud manuport ===
The Erfoud manuport was discovered in 1984 by Lutz Fiedler during an archaeological excavation near the town of Erfoud, Morocco. The manuport was found alongside other stone tools estimated to have been deposited 200,000-300,000 BP during the Lower Palaeolithic. Measuring approximately 68mm long, 35mm wide and 33mm thick, the Erfoud manuport is noteworthy for resembling a “perfectly naturalistic and life-size, non-erect human penis”.

The manuport is composed from a fragment of a cephalopod (Orthoceras sp.) that was silicified during the Devonian, Carboniferous, or Triassic periods. The fossil had to have been carried a substantial distance to its eventual site, as cuttlefish fossils are not found in this part of Eastern Morocco and they are known to be found commonly elsewhere. Microscopic analysis of the object’s surface has found no trace of human modification but does show signs of minor wear.

=== Barrow Island chert ===
In 2014, a chert manuport was discovered embedded in an ancient reef on Barrow Island, Western Australia. The island has no natural chert deposits and so the stone must have been carried from mainland Australia. Chert is a traditional toolstone and other chert artifacts found on Barrow Island have been modified to be used as a blade. The closest sources of chert are several kilometers away by boat in the Pilbara and Carnarvon Basin. The stone is believed to have been transported during the last Ice Age when the coastlines of Barrow Island and Australia would have been much closer and more easily traversable. The manuport notably displays no signs of fracture, despite being carried for the intended later use as a tool. This implies that the chert stone must have been lost at some point during transport.

The manuport was found lodged in calcrete, a kind of sedimentary rock typical of sand dunes and reefs that have dried out. The exposed portion of the chert measures 40mm wide by 35mm high. Chemical analysis has determined the calcrete’s age to be 41,000 years old, indicating the earliest possible date that the manuport was deposited. This supports other archeological discoveries on the island suggesting humans occupied Barrow Island as early as 53,000 years ago. Collectively these artifacts present one of the oldest examples of maritime resource exploitation outside of Africa.

Australian archeologists have noted that calcrete is an ideal medium for preservation and the finding of the Barrow Island manuport is a strong indication further artifacts are likely to be located along Western Australia’s limestone shelf.

=== Orange County galena ===
Sometime around 2006, a galena manuport was discovered in a cave in the San Joaquin Hills, California. Galena, or lead sulfide, has long been used as a mineral pigment by the local indigenous communities of what is now Southern California. The mineral has a naturally metallic sheen and can appear as lead-colored or dark silver when applied as paint. The cave the manuport was discovered in contains prehistoric rock art, for which galena was commonly used. The only nearby source of galena is between 26–32 km away and archeologists believe that the manuport was brought to the site through trade sometime during prehistory.

== Ambiguous manuports ==
It is not uncommon for ‘alien’ lithics to be found alongside other artifacts during archaeological excavations. Discerning whether certain stones are, indeed, manuports is difficult. There is no set criteria for determining a manuport and this designation is often provided at the researcher’s discretion.

=== Spirit Eye Cave pebbles ===
In a 2019 excavation in West Texas, archeologists uncovered 799 possible manuports from inside Spirit Eye Cave. Hundreds of unmodified, polished pebbles were uncovered, organized alongside other ‘cultural material’ that indicates human presence during prehistory. Sedimentary analysis indicates that these pebbles were deposited possibly 4,200 years BP. Researchers have suggested that this collection represents a portable form of ‘pebble art’, although their meaning is difficult to conclusively discern.

The pebbles demonstrate a striking uniformity. The hypothesis proposed by archeologists is that these stones are gastroliths. Whether they were deposited after birds had died in situ or later collected by humans is still up for debate, though cultural significance of the stones should not be ruled out. Given the technological prominence of stones in prehistory, there is a myriad of possible ‘cultural meanings’ these gastroliths represent. One explanation offered is that these stones, given their smaller size, could have made for effective projectiles. Another explanation suggests that, like other contemporary prehistoric cultures, the Spirit Eye Cave manuports may have been spiritually ‘eaten’ (or placed in the mouth) as part of a lithophagic ritual.

=== Manuport size and hominids ===
Manuports can reveal to archeologists what some of the cultural practices of early hominids were. A collection of 176 manuports found in Olduvai, Tanzania are believed to have been deposited sometime around 1.8mya. Measuring the collection reveals two clear groups of manuports in a ‘deliberate selection and hoarding by a hominid species’. One group demonstrates an average weight of approximately 400g, and the other with an average weight of 220g. A manuport, like a footprint, may indicate the locomotion and mass of the hominid who threw it. It is possible that the collection of manuports found in Olduvai represent selection for sexual dimorphism: 400g is an ideal mass to be thrown by a male, and 220g is an ideal mass for a female. Alternatively, these two groups represent two separate group of hominids, the larger presumably being homo erectus.

== See also ==
- Makapansgat pebble
- Erfoud manuport
- Found object
- Out-of-place artifact
