= Haasgat =

Fossil-bearing cave in Gauteng, South Africa

Haasgat Fossil Site, Cradle of Humankind
- Location within Gauteng
- Location: Gauteng, South Africa
- Nearest city: Broederstroom, South Africa
- Coordinates: 25°51′31″S 27°50′9″E
- Established: Formally discovered in 1987
- Governing body: Cradle of Humankind Management Authority and private landowner

Haasgat is a fossil-bearing cave system in the UNESCO-designated Cradle of Humankind in the Gauteng province in South Africa. It is located about 20 kilometres (12 mi) northeast of the hominin-bearing sites of Sterkfontein and Swartkrans and 60 kilometres (37 mi) north-northwest of Johannesburg. Haasgat is on private land and is not accessible by the public.

The cave system formed on the western slope of a narrow, north-south valley excised by a southeastern tributary of the Witwatersrandspruit River. As is the case with many of the dolomitic paleocaves in the region, the system was extensively mined for lime during the early 20th century. Although this mining obliterated the original cave entrance and parts of the system, the miners largely followed the original contours of the system. As a result, Haasgat is somewhat unusual in maintaining both the original roof and parietal contours, as well as remnant fossiliferous bands of calcified sediments throughout the ~100m long tunnel that comprises the modern cave.

== History of investigations ==
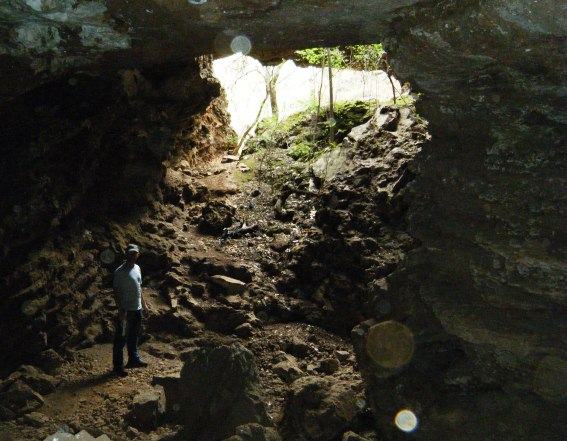
The Haasgat Fossil Site

While Haasgat was long known to residents of the Kalkheuvel West region (who named the cave Haasgat [Afrikaans: hare hole] after a resident red rock hare), the system was first mapped during a survey of regional caves by Martini and Keyser in 1987. The extensive ex situ calificied sediment miner's dumps at Haasgat were sampled by Andre Keyser in the late 1980s, yielding a fossil assemblage that was partially described in a series of publications. The site was abandoned after this single phase of sampling and data from the site has rarely been incorporated into studies of South African Plio-Pleistocene fossil record. Since 2010, an international interdisciplinary team has initiated a new phase of ex situ and in situ excavation, geological sampling, and faunal analysis.} Currently, this research program integrates researchers from the Ditsong National Museum of Natural History (South Africa; Stephany Potze, Lazarus Kgasi), Monash University (Australia; Justin W. Adams), La Trobe University (Australia; Andy I.R. Herries), Grand Valley State University (USA; Anthony D.T. Kegley), University of Melbourne (Australia; Robyn Pickering), and the School of Anatomical Sciences at the University of the Witwatersrand (South Africa; Jason Hemingway).

== Geology and age of deposits ==
Original interpretations of the formation of the Haasgat cave system (speleogenesis) emphasised development along a typical low-topographic relief pattern, where progressive erosion and deepening of the valley into the surface dolomites drained the phreatic cave, allowing for internal collapse and expansion of the system. Simultaneously, Keyser and Martini also suggested that the elevation of the system (near 1500m) and erosional deroofing prior to mining might indicate that the fossil deposits at Haasgat might have formed as early as the terminal Pliocene. Subsequent biostratigraphic interpretations of the fauna processed from the ex situ dumpsites produced two different proposed age ranges. An evaluation of the extinct baboon (Papio angusticeps) sample, a species currently only known across African Pleistocene deposits in the Kromdraai A assemblage, were taken to suggest that the Haasgat fossils were roughly contemporaneous (~1.9-1.8 million years ago). In contrast, a description of the non-primate faunas from the ex situ dumpsite emphasised the largely modern ungulate sample and suggested a more recent depositional age of maximally 1.5 – 0.5 million years ago. The recent analysis by Adams 2013 of all the ex-situ fauna from the cave suggests an age later than the first occurrence of Equus in Africa at ~2.3 Ma and an age prior to ~1.8 Ma also undertook a palaeomagnetic analysis of the cave deposits, indicating that the main in-situ fossil beds were older than the end of the Olduvai SubChron at 1.95 Ma and younger than the Gauss-Matuyama Boundary at 2.58 Ma. This suggests an age between 2.3 and 1.95 Ma for the majority of fossils from the site.
