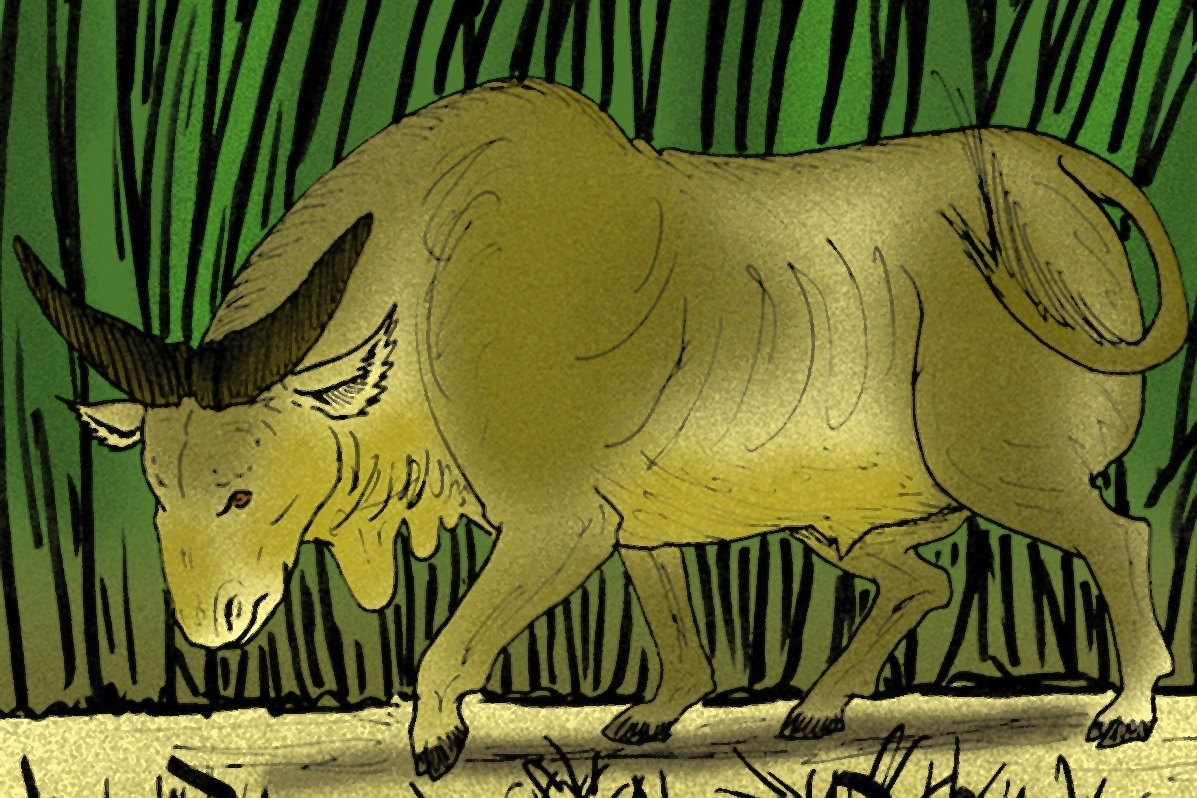
- Reconstruction of M. broomi

Scientific classification
- Kingdom: Animalia
- Phylum: Chordata
- Class: Mammalia
- Order: Artiodactyla
- Family: Bovidae
- Subfamily: Caprinae
- Tribe: Ovibovini
- Genus: †Makapania; Wells & Cooke, 1957
- Species: †M. broomi

Binomial name
- †Makapania broomi Wells & Cooke, 1957

= Makapania =

Makapania Temporal range: Pliocene-Pleistocene, possibly Holocene

Extinct genus of bovid mammals

Makapania is an extinct genus of large caprine or ovibovine from the Pliocene and Pleistocene of southern and East Africa. It is remarkable in that its horns were positioned laterally. Its body weight is estimated to have been about 263 kg.

Makapania is thought to have been both a browser and a grazer. It probably preferred grasses, and would have required a nearby source of permanent water.

Makapania broomi has been found at Sterkfontein Members 4 and 5, Swartkrans Members 1-3, Gladysvale, Motsetse and possibly Coopers. It has been recovered from 3-million-year-old sediments in East Africa. The type specimen was found at Makapansgat. This species existed from about 3 mya until 1 mya, or perhaps more recently.

Remains of an undescribed species of either Makapania or an unnamed related genus were found in mountain areas of South Africa and dated to just the 6th millennium BCE. The final extinction of this animal could be related to the retreat of dry grasslands in southern and eastern Africa after the Last Glacial Maximum, which also affected other megafauna from this environment like the giant hartebeest Megalotragus, giant zebra Equus capensis, springbok Antidorcas bondi, and bluebuck Hippotragus leucophaeus.

== Palaeobiology ==
=== Palaeoecology ===
Dental mesowear and microwear of M. broomi fossils from the Makapansgat Limeworks both suggest a grazing or a grass-dominated mixed feeding diet for M. broomi.
