= Long gu =

Fossils and ancient bones used in Chinese medicine

- lónggǔ written in seal script

Chinese name
- Traditional Chinese: 龍骨
- Simplified Chinese: 龙骨
- Literal meaning: dragon bones
Transcriptions
Standard Mandarin
- Hanyu Pinyin: lónggǔ
Hakka
- Romanization: liùng-kut
Yue: Cantonese
- Jyutping: lung^{4}gwat^{1}
Middle Chinese
- Middle Chinese: ljowng kwot
Old Chinese
- Zhengzhang: /*b·roŋ kuːd/

Japanese name
- Kanji: 竜骨
- Kana: りゅうこつ
Transcriptions
- Romanization: ryū kotsu

Latin name
- Latin: os draconis

Long gu or longgu (Chinese: 龙骨; pinyin: lónggǔ), literally translated as dragon bones (also referred to as os draconis or fossilia ossis mastodi), are remains of ancient life (such as fossils) prescribed for a variety of ailments in Chinese medicine and herbalism. They were historically believed, and are traditionally considered, to be the remains of dragons.

== Description ==
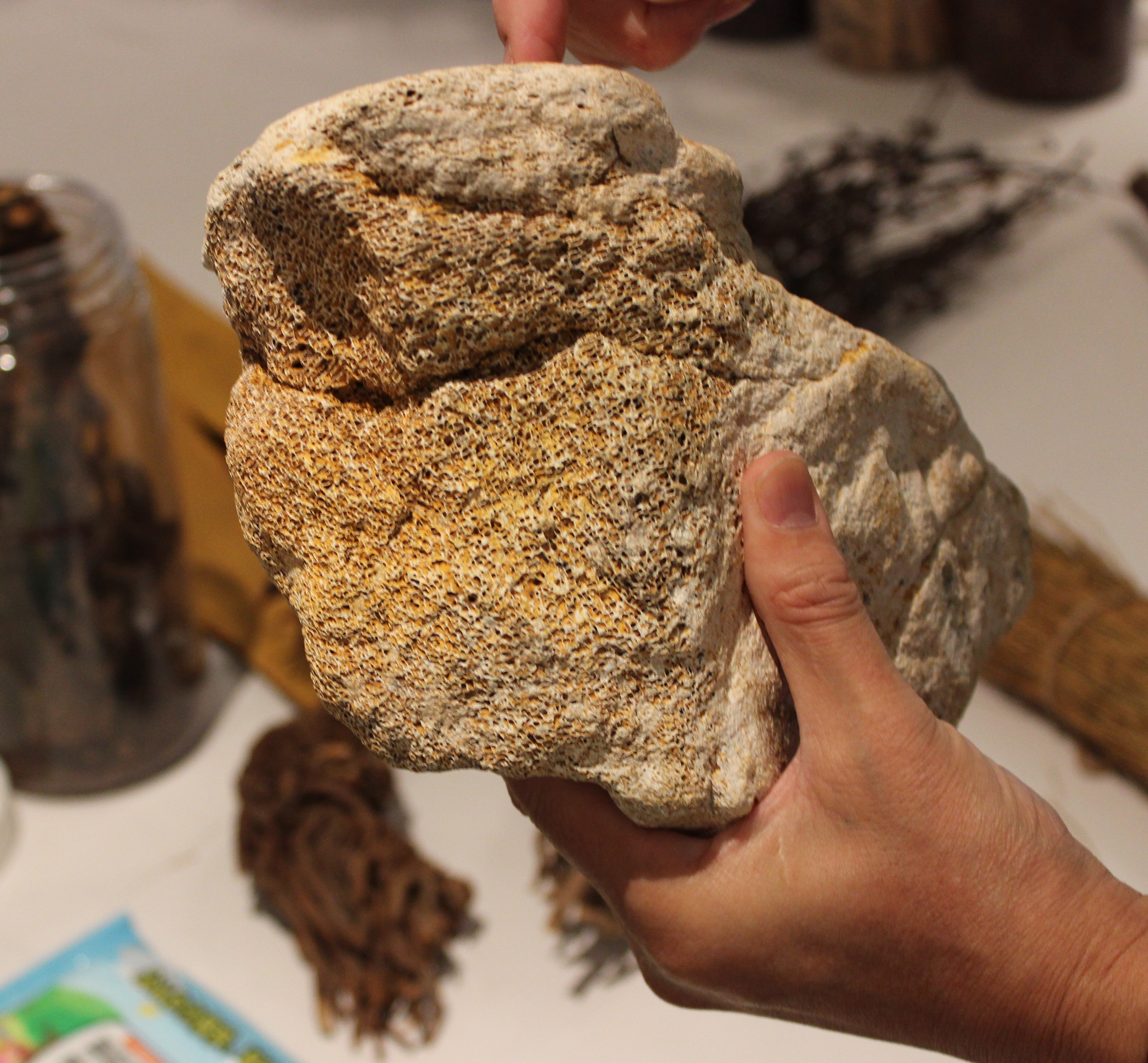
A chunk of long gu (fossil mammalian bone)

Dragon bones are generally mammal fossils, petrified wood, or even oracle bones. Animals remain identified as dragon bones are primarily mammals from the Neogene and Pleistocene, including rhinoceroses like Aceratherium, bears, deer, antelope, giraffids, elephants, the extinct three-toed equine Hipparion, the elephant-relative Stegodon, hyena, tapirs, orangutan, porcupine, giant panda, and the extinct giant ape Gigantopithecus. In 2007, a village in Henan province was reported to be using real dinosaur bones as dragon bones for TCM. Other animals treated as dragon bones are not even vertebrates at all, with the Devonian brachiopod Spirifer verneuili being common in 19th century dragon bone collections.

== History ==
=== Background ===
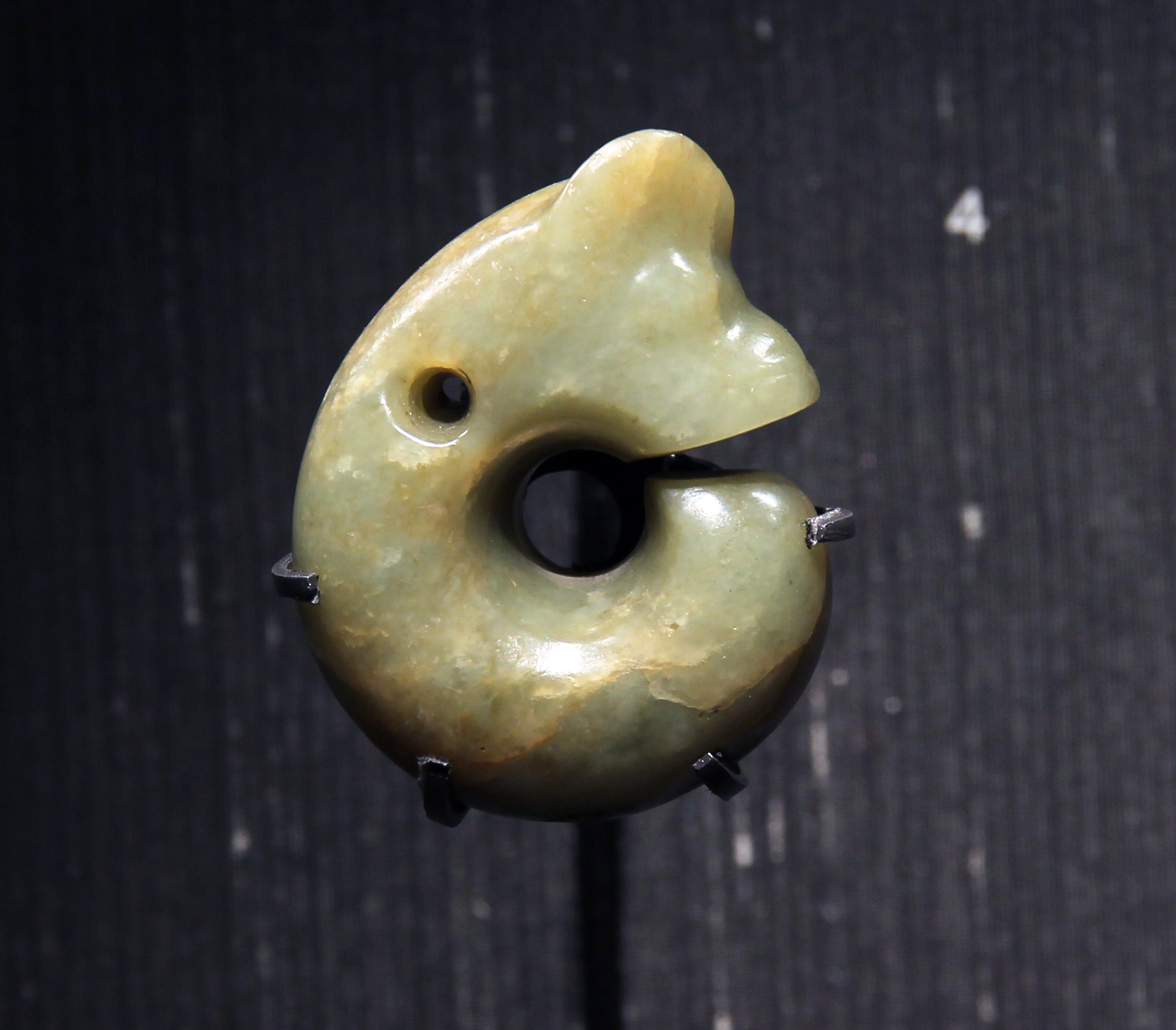
A Chinese Neolithic (Hongshan culture) jade ornament in the form of a curled pig dragon

Depictions of Chinese dragons (龍, lóng) first appear in the archaeological record circa 3000 BC, before any literary descriptions appear. Dragon worship may have its origin in constellations associated with the lengthening days and rainfall in spring, later being given more abstract meanings. However, "the dragon flourished in art without a set of specific associations."

=== Ancient and traditional use ===
Dragon bones have been prescribed in Chinese medicine since at least the Shennong Bencaojing, composed circa 100 AD. There is historical discussion regarding the origin of long gu recorded in the Bencao Gangmu, which compiles a wide variety of Chinese medical sources. The Mingyi bielu claims that dragon bones are found in Jin and around Mt. Tai, and that dead dragons can be located in riverbanks and caves throughout the year; while Tao Hongjing states they can be found in Liang, Yi, and Ba. Lei Xiao reports that bones from Tanzhou, Cangzhou, and Taiyuan are of the highest quality. There was debate as to whether long gu were from dead or living dragons, and whether they were bones or secretions. Li Shizhen listed several subcategories of dragon material, including tooth, horn, brain, fetus, and saliva.

Fr. d'Incarville, a French Jesuit, noted that "petrified bones" were among the pharmacopeia sold by druggists in Beijing in 1751. However, he did not refer to these as dragon's bones. Robert Swinhoe described the use of dragon's teeth in 1870:

Shanghai is a great center for [fossil trade]; and the raw article can be procured here in quantity. In other large towns you can only get the prepared drug in a calcined state. These fossils are called Lungche, or 'Dragon's teeth;' and the idea about them is that in olden time the world consisted of monsters who were incessantly fighting and killing one another [...] The monsters were large and powerful brutes; and in their teeth and bones existed their strength; hence the remains of these ground to powder and taken internally must give strength to the weak invalid.

In 1885, 20 tons of fossil bones came through Chinese ports. Searching Chinese pharmacies for new fossil specimens was "an established stratagem of fossil-hunters in the Far East." Western investigation of dragon bones led to the discovery of Peking Man and Gigantopithecus blacki. Wang Yirong identified the ancient Chinese oracle script on long gu in 1899.

== Use ==
An 18th century medical treaty prescribes dragon bones for heart, kidney, intestine, liver ailments, and to calm the spirit. It is also used for constipation, nightmares, epilepsy, excessive perspiration, night sweats and chronic diarrhea. It is considered to have neutral, sweet, or astringent properties. It is taken raw, fried, or simmered in rice wine. The Bencao Gangmu describes white dragon bones (白龍骨, bái lónggǔ) as

control[ing] frequent passage of essence, and discharge of essence with urination [...] They dispel evil qi, pacify the spirit of the heart, and end sexual intercourse with demons during nightly dreams. [...] They end intestinal wind and discharge with blood. Nose flood and blood spitting. They end outflow and free-flux illness with thirst illness. They strengthen the spleen, and contract intestines and stomach [...] They boost the kidneys and press down fright. They end yin-type malaria. They absorb moist qi and [cure] anal prolapse. They let muscles grow and help wounds to close.

Dragon bones are still used today in some parts of China, and it remains an economically important resource. Rural people still collect long gu for traditional use and this practice has important effects on Chinese paleontology. The 2010 Regulation on the Protection of Fossils has limited the production of dragon bones to fossils determined to have no archeological value, typically badly preserved ones.

In TCM practice, oyster shells (ostreae concha) are considered to have a similar function and may be used in place of or together with dragon bones.

=== Efficacy ===
Traditional Chinese medicine is considered pseudoscience and there is no evidence of the efficacy of dragon bones; however, they are a significant source of calcium.

== See also ==
- Chinese dragon
- Peking Man
- Traditional Chinese medicines derived from the human body
- Ethnopaleontology
