= Makapansgat pebble =

Ancient stone found in South Africa

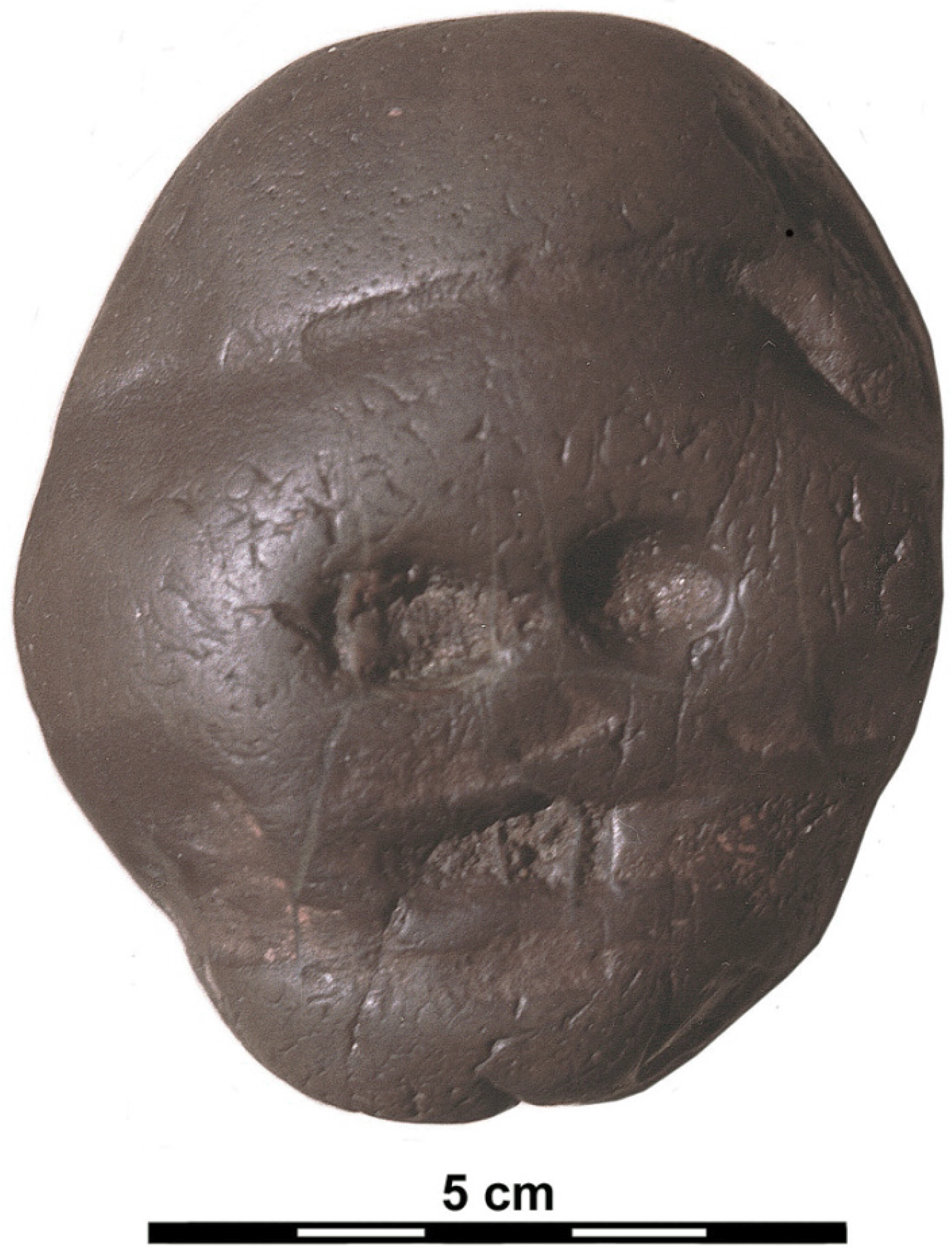
Makapansgat pebble.

The Makapansgat pebble or Makapansgat cobble (ca. 3,000,000 BP) is a jasper pebble with markings resembling a human face, in fact at least two possible faces. Some scholars argue that it is the oldest known manuport.

The stone belongs to the Evolutionary Studies Institute at Witwatersrand University in Johannesburg, where it is kept in storage.

== Description ==
The Makapansgat pebble is a 260 g (9.2 oz), 8.3 cm (3.3 in) long, 7 cm (2.8 in) wide, and 3.8 cm (1.5 in) thick, reddish-brown jasperite cobble.

The pebble was found in 1925 in a dolomite cave in the Makapan Valley north of Mokopane, South Africa by local school teacher Wilfred Eitzman. Importantly, it was found at 4.8 km/3 miles from the nearest possible natural source (or 32 km/20 miles according to Dart). The site also contained bones of Australopithecus (later this attribution was widened to australopithecines or other early hominins).

The pebble and all its markings are formed naturally by geological processes; no traces of artificial modification have been detected.

== Interpretation ==
It has been suggested that some Australopithecus might have recognized it as a symbolic face, in possibly the earliest example of symbolic thinking or aesthetic sense in the human heritage, and brought the pebble back to the cave. This would make it a candidate for the oldest known manuport.

The pebble had been described in literature and featured in the television program The Roots of Art in November 1967, before it gained new attention in 1974 when Raymond Dart (who had first seen it shortly after it was found) published a new interpretation. While Eitzman had already suggested the pebble was brought to the cave because of the resemblance to a face, Dart recognized other faces when the stone is viewed from different angles.

The Makapansgat pebble cannot be seen as art if a usual definition of the term is used, as the object was found and not made. Nevertheless, that an australopithecine may have recognized a face would reveal that early hominids had capacity for symbolic thinking, necessary for the development of art and language.

== Controversy ==
Whether early hominids really saw this object as a face or just enjoyed the pebble remains unclear. Factors adding to the uncertainty surrounding the piece are that we do not know exactly where in the cave it was found, nor the hominid species the bones are from, nor whether these bones had been brought into the cave by animal scavengers.

== See also ==
- Erfoud manuport
- Venus of Tan-Tan
- Venus of Berekhat Ram
