= Ethnopaleontology =

Study of the relationship between humans and fossils

Ethnopaleontology is the study of the relationship between humans and fossils, or the preserved remains of ancient organisms.

== History and development ==
In 1586, William Camden recorded superstitions regarding ammonites found at Whitby in North Yorkshire, which represents an early separation between colloquial and folk traditions and learned or scholarly interpretations. Ethnopaleontology, as an independent field, was independently proposed by Heracli Astudillo as part of a wider "cultural paleontology" in 2010, and by Geraldo Jorge Barbosa de Moura and Ulysses Paulino Albuquerque in 2012. Ethnopaleontology has been applied to the medicinal use of turtle fossils in Latin America, the use of Ordovician ichnofossils in the architecture of Monsagro, Triassic coprolites used in Thai amulets, ancient crabs used in Siddha medicine, and other phenomena.

=== Geomythology ===
Geomythology is the application of euhemerism to myths, which seeks to uncover a geological origin in ancient folklore or traditional narratives. A famous example of this approach, originating from Adrienne Mayor, is that stories about griffins originate from ancient encounters with fossilized Protoceratops in Central Asia, though some paleontologists have rejected this hypothesis. Moura and Albuquerque proposed that ethnopaleontology "belongs within the scope of geomythology". The reliance of ethnopaleontology on geomythology has been questioned.

== Fossils in culture ==
Humans have utilized fossils for thousands of years. The Erfoud manuport, a fossilized fragment of a cuttlefish found at an Acheulean site in Africa, suggests that cultural engagement with fossils reaches back before Homo sapiens if genuine.

=== Antiquity ===
In 2025 a trilobite fossil mounted as a pendant was excavated from a first millennium Roman site in Spain. Long gu, fossil mammal bones utilized in Traditional Chinese Medicine, were initially thought to be dragon bones. Amber and jet have been utilized as decorative materials since prehistory.

=== Medieval Europe ===
In scholarly culture, medieval lapidarists like Albertus Magnus discuss animal-related stones and their uses that would today be considered fossils, however their identity rarely overlaps completely with modern categories. Snakestone is identified with ammonites, as well as serpentine, ancient glass beads, or other materials. Thunderstones are associated with stone tools, belemnites, echinoids, ammonites, or other materials. Aetites or eaglestone generally refers to hollow geodes, but became associated with Neospirifer in parts of South America. Toadstone is now identified as Scheenstia teeth or bezoars. Tonguestone is now identified as shark teeth. Lyngurium possibly refers to a form of amber.

=== Modernity ===
The most pertinent cultural use of fossils in the modern world is the predominance of fossil fuels.

== See also ==
- Other interdisciplinary geology subfields:
  - Geoheritage, the geological aspect of natural and cultural heritage
  - Geomythology, geological euhemerism applied to mythology
- Other interdisciplinary anthropology or archaeology subfields:
  - Paleoanthropology, the study of fossil hominids
