= The Hunters or the Hunted? =

1981 book by Charles Kimberlin Brain

The Hunters or the Hunted? An Introduction to African Cave Taphonomy
- Authors: Charles Kimberlin Brain
- Language: English
- Genre: Reference work
- Publisher: University of Chicago Press
- Publication date: 1981
- Publication place: United States
- Pages: 376 pages (paperback)
- ISBN: 0226070905

The Hunters or the Hunted? An Introduction to African Cave Taphonomy is a 1981 book by Charles Kimberlin Brain regarding the taphonomy of cave deposits in Africa.

== Structure and content ==
The book is divided into two parts. The first part, "A Guide to the Interpretation of Bone Accumulations in African Caves," details the processes and effects on how taphonomy occurs. The second part, "Fossil Assemblages from the Sterkfontein Valley Caves: Analysis and Interpretation," deals successively with the Sterkfontein, Swartkrans, and Kromdraai caves. The final chapter, "Who were the hunters and who the hunted", concludes that australopithecines found in the three caves were brought in by carnivores, contrary to Raymond Dart's Osteodontokeratic culture hypothesis, which proposed that the bones were brought in by the australopithecines themselves.

== Reception ==
Neil Tappen, writing in the American Journal of Physical Anthropology, wrote that the book "brings together the findings of a versatile investigator who has been working many years to interpret the hominid-bearing cave deposits in South Africa. It is a mine of information for professional students of the fossil record of human evolution, but the narrative is so clearly written that it should also capture the interest of undergraduates with a background in physical anthropology." He further states that the book is "a substantial reference work as well as an account of research; it should prove valuable to specialists as well as those with a general interest in the hominid fossil record."

R. J. G. S., writing in Geological Magazine, described the book as "substantial, carefully documented and magnificently produced", although he questioned "the cost effectiveness of publishing long lists of material." He concluded, "All workers on African Pleistocene mammal faunas will certainly find a valuable store of information here. Those on other continents will doubtless use the data for comparison. But one is left with the final nagging feeling that taphonomy is not yet a science - at least not in the Popperian sense."

Richard Klein, writing in Paleobiology, wrote that "Brain has shown that Dart was unjustified in concluding that the australopithecine bone assemblages reflect bone-tooth-horn ("osteodontokeratic") tool use by the australopithecines or even that it was the australopithecines who accumulated bones in the various Transvaal caves. However, Brain's countercase for carnivores as the primary bone accumulators may in turn be criticized on the grounds that it is plausible, but not compelling." Concluding that the book "has not only significantly advanced our understanding of an important paleoanthropological problem, but that he has also taken it as far as it can go with present knowledge, methods, and materials. His writing style is clear and unpretentious, and his text is well supported by illustrations and tables."
