= Erfoud manuport =

Fossilized cuttlefish fragment

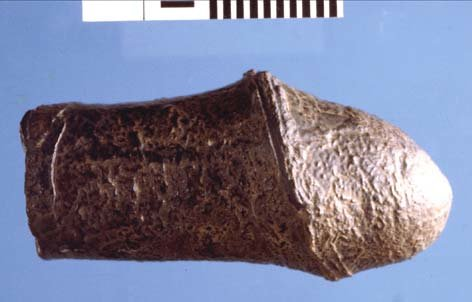
The Erfoud manuport

The Erfoud manuport is a fossilized fragment of a cephalopod (specifically an orthocere), that resembles a life-size, non-erect human penis. It measures 70 mm long and 35 mm across at its widest point. Harry Ritchie described it as "the most amusing item in archaeology...which looks so like a phallus that it undermines its supposed significance as a symbolic artefact." It "may be the earliest known manuport to be carried by a representative of [...] Homo sapiens." Similar fossil manuports with phallic associations, which some archaeologists have compared to the Erfoud manuport, have been excavated near Bolsa Chica in California.

The fossil was found in 1984 by Lutz Fiedler of Marburg University at an archaeological site near Erfoud and Rissani in eastern Morocco. It was found among a dense concentration of Late Acheulean stone tools, suggested to date to around 300,000–200,000 years ago. No evidence of carving or other modification has been detected. Cephalopod fossils occur elsewhere in Morocco but are not native to the area where the specimen was found. Bednarik proposed that it had been transported to the site because of its resemblance to a human penis and identified it as a possible manuport. The rocks that the fossil originates from are probably Devonian, Carboniferous, or Triassic in age.

It is notable for its implications on the origin of language and Paleolithic cognition, particularly as a counterpoint to Chomskyan linguistics, which critics such as Daniel Everett characterize as neglecting iconicity. The neuroscientist Elliot Murphy argues "the capacity to bind bodily concepts either to concrete instantiations or more abstract symbolic representations in the form of manuports involves some form of impressive semantic mapping of the kind subsequently exploited by the language system in anatomically modern humans." It is also cited as an example of ancient human interest in fossils.

== See also ==
- Makapansgat pebble
