= Geomythology =

Study of descriptions of geological events in mythology

Geomythology (also called “legends of the earth," "landscape mythology," “myths of observation,” “natural knowledge") is the study of oral and written traditions created by pre-scientific cultures to account for, often in poetic or mythological imagery, geological events and phenomena such as earthquakes, volcanoes, floods, tsunamis, land formation, fossils, and natural features of the landscape. Dorothy Vitaliano, a geologist at Indiana University, coined the term in 1968.

Geomythology indicates every case in which the origin of myths and legends can be shown to contain references to geological phenomena and aspects, in a broad sense including astronomical ones (comets, eclipses, meteor impacts, etc.). As indicated by Vitaliano (1973) 'primarily, there are two kinds of geologic folklore, that in which some geologic feature or the occurrence of some geologic phenomenon has inspired a folklore explanation, and that which is the garbled explanation of some actual geologic event, usually a natural catastrophe'.

Oral traditions about nature are often expressed in mythological language and may contain genuine and perceptive natural knowledge based on careful observation of physical evidence over generations. In some instances, geomyths can provide valuable information about past earthquakes, tsunamis, floods, impact events, fossil discoveries, and other events.

Geomyths include folk explanations of conspicuous geological features, and sometimes garbled or metaphorical descriptions of catastrophic geological events that were witnessed in antiquity. In the case of massive geomorphic events in the pre-human past, such as mountain formation, observations and imagination combined in mythic explanations that were handed down orally over millennia. In the case of natural catastrophes within living human memory, descriptions were handed down over generations. Both types of geomyth often include supernatural details. Because the descriptive narratives were expressed in mythological language, scientists and historians have not been aware of the real events and rational concepts embedded in geomythological stories. One type of geomyth includes tales arising from imagination or popular misconceptions, for example, beings magically transformed into stone to account for landforms. As more studies are done in geomythology, however, scientists and historians are finding accurate insights about geological processes. And datable events such as tsunamis, earthquakes, and volcanic eruptions have been found to be recorded by eyewitness accounts, some from thousands of years ago.

Some myths transmitted real information about real events and observations, preserving geological data over millennia within non-literate cultures. A well-documented example of a datable geological event recorded in myth is the creation of Crater Lake in Oregon when Mount Mazama collapsed. Geologists’ scientific interpretation of how the volcanic cataclysm long ago resulted in Crater Lake, is echoed point for point in a local myth of its origin, told by members of the Klamath Indian tribe who saw it happen almost 8,000 years ago.

In August 2004 the 32nd International Geological Congress held a session on "Myth and Geology", which resulted in the first peer-reviewed collection of papers on the subject (2007).

== Examples ==
=== Fimbulwinter ===
The Norse mythological tale of the unending winter – the Fimbulwinter – has been posited to be an example of geomythology. Here the Fimbulwinter is seen as a Viking folk memory of a much earlier time when an eruption in Central America at Lake Ilopango caused a long winter throughout the world. The eruption spewed 87 cubic kilometres of ejecta into the atmosphere, blocking out the sunlight. Trees withered for lack of sun and crops failed. In Scandinavia, a region already low on agricultural land, many people starved to death: as many as half the population of Scandinavia died during the long winter, according to one estimate, and the effects went on for at least three years. Archaeologist Neil Price has argued that the Fimbulwinter myth is likely a folk memory of this time, although he is careful to point out that "Geomythology is by its very nature an inexact concept: inherently unproveable, prone to confirmation bias, and hampered by a lack of precise dating in both textual and archaeological sources." Price gives several examples as to why the Fimbulwinter myth is an example of geomythology. One example is from Snorri's poem the Poetic Edda:

First of all that a winter will come called Fimbulwinter.

Then snow will drift from all directions.

There will then be great frosts and keen winds.

The sun will do no good.

There will be three of these winters together

and no summer in between.

"The description of this terrible distortion of the seasons," writes Price, "is remarkably similar to the cycle scientists postulate for the immediate effects of the eruptions."

=== South African Horned Serpent ===
A horned serpent cave art is known from the La Belle France cave in South Africa, often conflated with the Dingonek. It may be based on dicynodont fossils.

=== St Patrick's Rock ===
There is a legend that St Patrick's Bridge was formed when Irish patron saint Saint Patrick chased the Devil from County Tipperary down to the coast of County Wexford. The legend says that the Devil went into the water, with Patrick throwing stones as the Devil swam, (Note: In the legend, Saint Patrick does not follow the Devil into the water as he is unable to swim.) with the arc-shape of the landform being the devil's swimming route.

The legend also says that St Patrick's Rock is a piece of the Forth Mountain that Saint Patrick threw into the Celtic Sea, though the Forth Mountain is quartzite while St Patrick's Rock is granite. The Geological Survey of Ireland considers the legend to be an example of geomythology.

=== American West Coast deluge ===
According to J. G Swan (1868), the Makah American Indian people, who occupied the tip of the Olympic Peninsula in Washington State, USA, have an old story of a deluge. A long time ago, but not at a very remote period, Swan was informed, a rise of water flowed over fields and meadows, making an island of Cape Flattery. The waters receded over a four-day period, leaving Neah Bay dry. The waters then returned, and are said to have submerged the entire area, killing many and the rest escaping in canoes, and receding to its normal level in four days.

=== The Lowland Hundred (Cantre'r Gwaelod) ===
A mythological ancient sunken kingdom that, according to oral tradition, existed between Ramsey Island and Bardsey Island in what is now Cardigan Bay to the west of Wales. Further research revealed that this tract of land was indeed inhabited, with there being a submerged forest and evidence of ancient settlements present.

=== Sangkuriang ===
The now-dried Lake Bandung in Indonesia is referenced in the Sundanese folktale of Sangkuriang, suggesting that cultural memory of the lake's existence has been preserved through oral tradition.

== See also ==
- Landscape mythology
- Euhemerus
- Ethnopaleontology
- Folk memory
