= Charles Kimberlin Brain =

South African paleontologist (1931–2023)

- Born: 7 May 1931; Salisbury, Southern Rhodesia
- Died: 7 June 2023 (aged 92); Irene, Gauteng, South Africa
- Other names: C. K. Brain; Bob Brain
- Education: Pretoria Boys High School; University of the Witwatersrand
- Children: 4
- Scientific career
- Fields: Palaeontology
- Workplaces: University of the Witwatersrand

Charles Kimberlin Brain (7 May 1931 – 6 June 2023), also known as C. K. "Bob" Brain, was a South African paleontologist who studied and taught African cave taphonomy for more than fifty years.

== Biography ==
Brain was born in Salisbury, Southern Rhodesia on 7 May 1931. He was the son of the entomologist, Charles Kimberlin Brain, the Director of Agriculture of Southern Rhodesia, and Zoe Findlay.

From 1965 to 1991, Brain directed the Transvaal Museum, which became one of the most scientifically productive institutions of its kind in Africa during his tenure.

During his years at the museum, Brain actively pursued his own research, which was A-rated by the Foundation for Research Development (now the National Research Foundation of South Africa) from the inception of its evaluation system in 1984 until his retirement.

Brain planned and scripted the displays in the museum's "Life’s Genesis I" and "Life's Genesis 2" halls, which have been seen by several million visitors.

Very early in Brain's career, Robert Ardrey wrote of him:

[In 1958] I was spending a night in a South African village with a party of scientists. One in the party was Dr. C. K. Brain, an amazing young man from the Transvaal Museum.

Brain is a scientist's scientist, and I know of none so young on any continent who has acquired from achievements so varied a reputation quite so wide. He is a Rhodesian, from a family related to that of Eugène Marais. He has a long, distinguished face and his mode of expression, unlike my own, is as a rule one of long, distinguished silences. Brain was twenty-seven at the time, and had taken his doctorate in geology.

He had followed this with three fruitful years in anthropology, in which time he had furnished palaeontology with its only comprehensive geological survey of all five australopithecine sites; had developed techniques of ancient dating never thought of before by anyone; and with his uncovering of primitive stone handaxes at Sterkfontein had made a discovery ranked by Dr. Kenneth P. Oakley of the British Museum as one of the anthropological milestones of the century."

— Robert Ardrey, African Genesis, p. 69, 1961.

Although Brain retired in 1996, he was active as Curator Emeritus at the Transvaal Museum, an Honorary Professor of Zoology at the University of the Witwatersrand, an active Research Associate at the Bernard Price Institute for Palaeontological Research, and Chief Scientific Advisor to the Palaeo-Anthropology Scientific Trust (PAST). He was an active researcher of fossils of the earliest animals and was co-ordinating a renewed excavation initiative at the Swartkrans Cave. He was a consulting editor for the Annals of the Eastern Cape Museums.

In its 2006 Lifetime Achiever tribute to Brain, the National Research Foundation of South Africa said:

Dr Brain was also personally involved and supervised a 30-year-long excavation of the Swartkrans Cave in the Sterkfontein Valley (now the Cradle of Humankind). This cave was the first to demonstrate the coexistence of robust ape men with early humans and produced more remains of robust ape men (Paranthropus) than any other site in the world.

His objective was to obtain a large and meticulously documented sample of fossils and cultural objects from the complex stratigraphic units in the cave and to do taphonomic interpretations on these, throwing light on how the animals (including the hominids) lived and died. His excavation produced a sample of 240,000 fossils from a very diverse fauna. These emphasise the importance of predation to the evolution of human intelligence and provided evidence for the earliest controlled use of fire by humans nearly one million years ago.

For nearly ten years Dr Brain has been looking for evidence of the oldest known predators among fossils of invertebrates from 700 million year old limestones in Namibia. His finds show how the predatory process started in the animal lineages."

— National Research Foundation of South Africa, Newsletter.

Brain was invited participant at over thirty international conferences and symposia worldwide. He and his wife had four children. He died on 8 June 2023, at the age of 92.

A species of legless lizard, Typhlosaurus braini, is named in his honour.

== Education ==
- Pretoria Boys High School
- BSc. in zoology and geology — University of the Witwatersrand, 1950.
- PhD in geology — University of the Witwatersrand, 1957.
- D.Sc. — University of the Witwatersrand, 1981.

== Honours and awards ==
- Four Honorary Doctorates:

1999: University of the Witwatersrand
1999: University of Pretoria
1993: University of Natal
1991: University of Cape Town

- 2006: National Research Foundation of South Africa (NRF) President's Lifetime Achiever award.
- 1997: South Africa Medal of the Southern Africa Association for the Advancement of Science
- 1992: Achievement Award of the Claude Harris Leon Foundation
- 1991: John F. W. Herschel Medal of the Royal Society of South Africa
- 1987: Senior Captain Scott Memorial Medal of the South African Biological Society

== Scholarly scientific societies ==
In addition to other active memberships, Brain was a founding member of four societies:

- Palaeontological Society of Southern Africa
- South African Archaeological Society
- South African Society for Quaternary Research
- Zoological Society of Southern Africa
  - 1974–75: President
  - 1969–73: Vice President

== Publications ==
- Nearly two hundred, including several books.

=== Books ===
- "Swartkrans: A Cave’s Chronicle of Early Man." (ed.) 2nd Edition. Transvaal Museum Monograph No. 8, 1–295, 2005.
- "Fifty years of fun with fossils: some cave taphonomy-related ideas and concepts that emerged between 1953 and 2003." In African Taphonomy: A Tribute to the Career of C.K. "Bob" Brain. Edited by Travis Pickering, Katherine Schick, and Nicholas Toth, Center for Research into the Anthropological Foundations of Technology (CRAFT Center), Stone Age Institute, Indiana University Bloomington, 2004.
- Raymond Dart and our African origins. In A Century of Nature: Twenty-One Discoveries that Changed Science and the World, Laura Garwin and Tim Lincoln, editors. Chicago: University of Chicago Press, 2003. Hardcover: ISBN 0-226-28413-1. Paperback: ISBN 0-226-28415-8.
- The Hunters or the Hunted?: An Introduction to African Cave Taphonomy. C.K. Brain. Chicago: University of Chicago Press, 1981. Paperback: ISBN 0-226-07090-5, ISBN 978-0-226-07090-2. Press page.

=== Scientific journals ===
(This list is very incomplete.)

- The Transvaal Ape-Man-Bearing Cave Deposits: An overview of the sites at Sterkfontein, Kromdraai, Swartkrans and Makapan. Transvaal Museum Memoir No. 11, 1958. (Dr. Brain's PhD thesis.)
  - Reviewed by F. Clark Howell in Science, Volume 129, Issue 3354, p. 957. April 1959.
  - Republished in book form by "Netherlands Repro" (?)
- "The Narrative Concept in Museum Display." South African Museums Association Bulletin 1978.
- "Visitor Reaction to the Life's Genesis Display." South African Museums Association Bulletin 1979.
