= Makapansgat =

Archaeological and palaeontological site in South Africa

Makapan Valley
UNESCO World Heritage Site
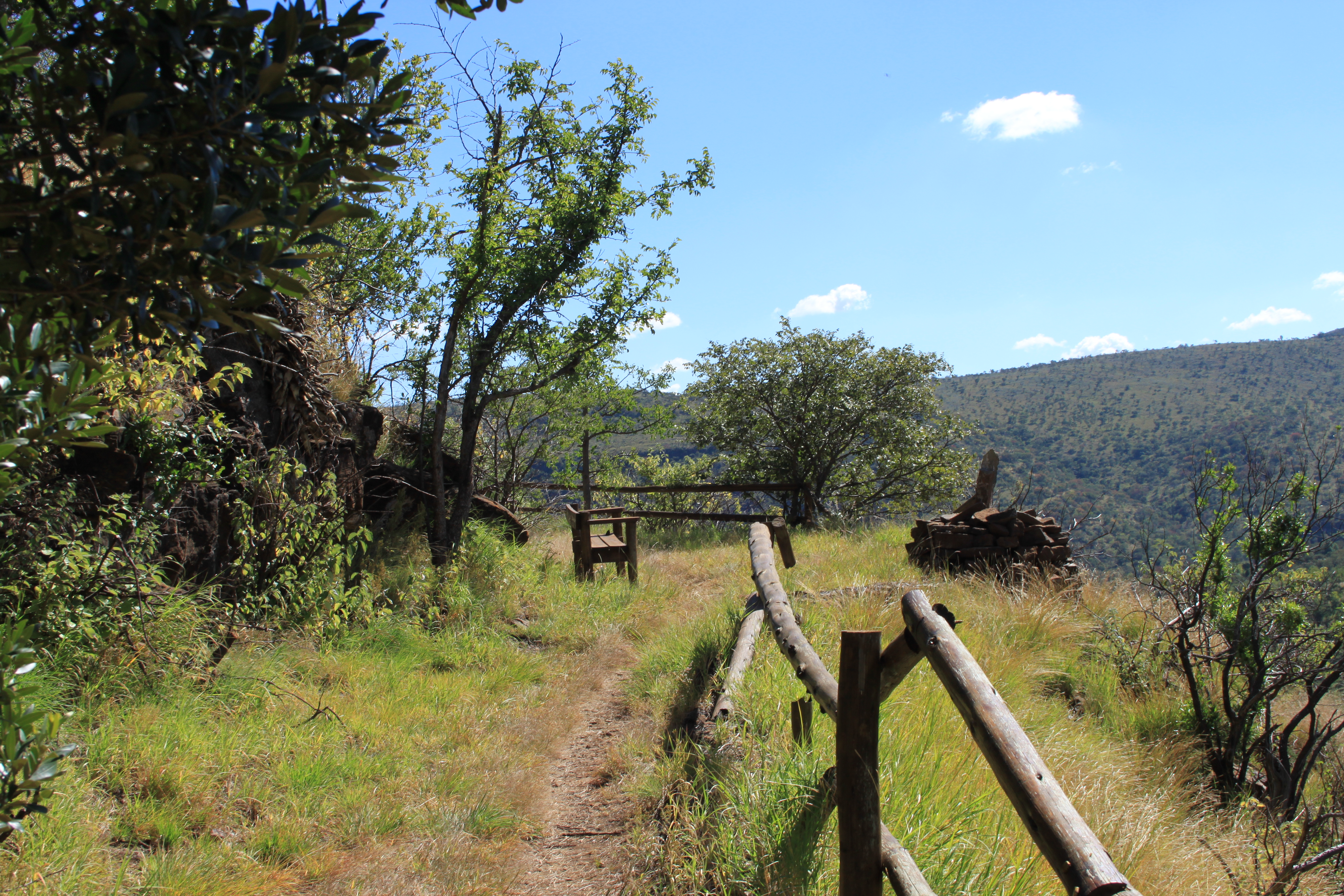

- Location within Limpopo Location within South Africa
- Location: Limpopo, South Africa
- Part of: Fossil Hominid Sites of South Africa
- Criteria: Cultural: (iii)(vi)
- Reference: 915bis-002
- Inscription: 1999 (23rd Session)
- Extensions: 2005
- Area: 2,220 ha (5,500 acres)
- Buffer zone: 55,000 ha (140,000 acres)
- Coordinates: 24°9′31″S 29°10′37″E

Makapansgat (/mʌkʌˈpʌnsxʌt/) (or Makapan Valley World Heritage Site) is an archaeological location within the Makapansgat and Zwartkrans Valleys, northeast of Mokopane in Limpopo province, South Africa. It is an important palaeontological site, with the local limeworks containing Australopithecus-bearing deposits dating to between 3.0 and 2.6 million years BP. The whole Makapan Valley has been declared a South African Heritage Site. Makapansgat belongs to the Cradle of Humankind.

== Makapansgat Valley sites ==
=== Makapansgat limeworks ===
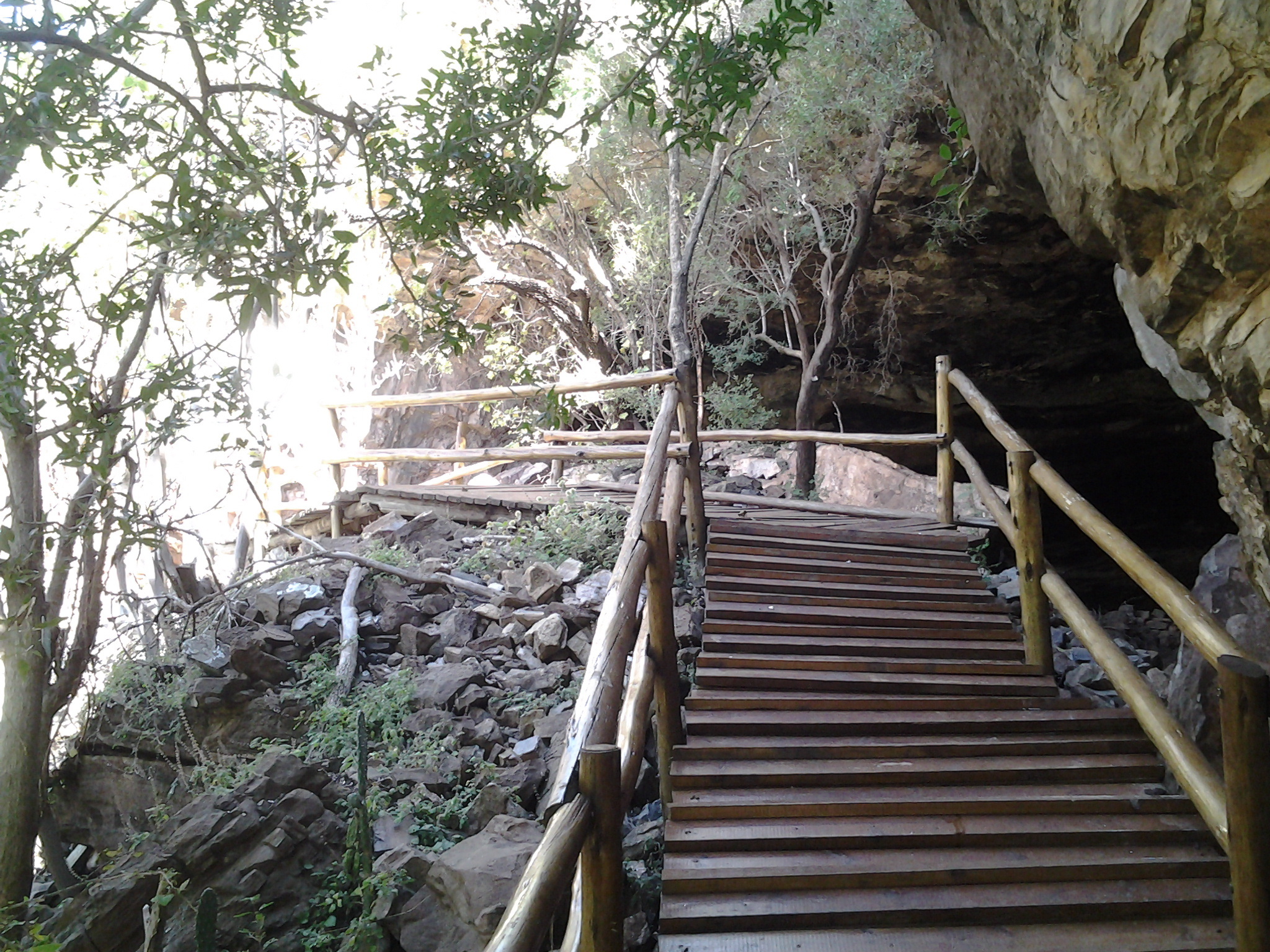

This is the oldest of the cave sites in the Makapansgat valley, spanning an age of greater than 4.0 million years until perhaps 1.6 million years ago. This site has yielded many thousands of fossil bones, amongst which were found remains of the gracile australopithecine Australopithecus africanus. The A. africanus fossils are suggested to date to between 2.85 and 2.58 million years ago based on palaeomagnetism by Andy Herries (La Trobe University, Australia). The site was recently excavated by a joint project between the University of the Witwatersrand in South Africa and Arizona State University in the US.

=== Cave of Hearths and Hyaena Mandible Cave ===
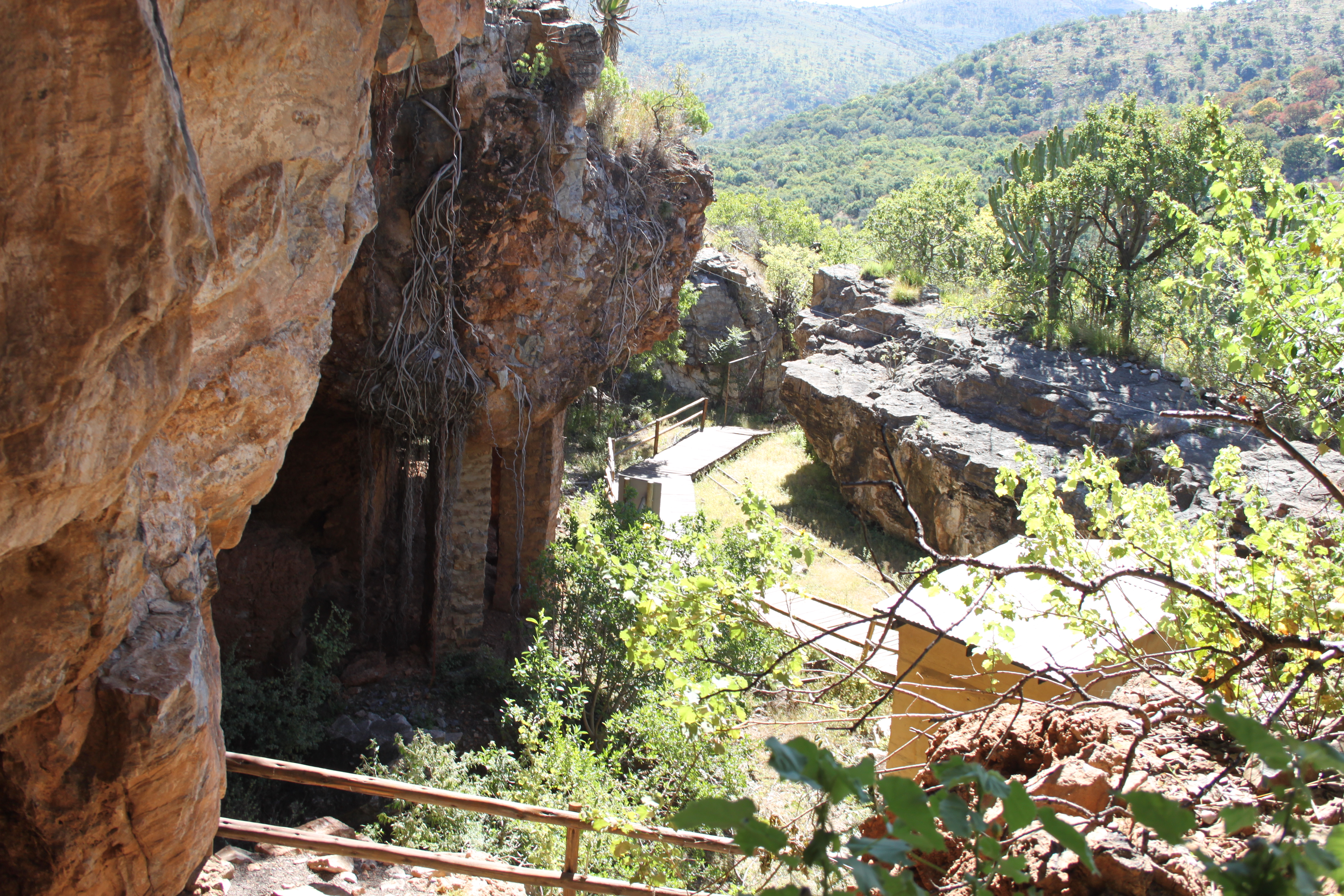

The Cave of Hearths is close to the Historic Cave complex and preserves a remarkably complete record of human occupation from Early Stone Age "Acheulian" times in the oldest sediments through the Middle Stone Age, the Later Stone Age and up to the Iron Age. European relics from the 19th century, such as brass ware and musket balls were found at the surface when excavations started. The site was re-excavated and re-analysed as part of the 'Makapan Middle Pleistocene Research Project' run by the University of Liverpool (UK) between 1996 and 2001. This work has shown that coloured sediment horizons in the Early Stone Age levels are not from fire use. A Homo mandible also recovered from these layers may also represent one of the earliest representatives of Homo sapiens.

=== Buffalo Cave ===
A small number of fossils were thought to have been collected by Dr Robert Broom from this site in 1937, including the remains of an extinct 'pygmy buffalo', Bos makapania, for which the cave is named. More recent excavations have revealed an extensive 'Cornelian Land Mammal Age' fauna including antelope, horses, pigs, monkeys and carnivores. The fauna, along with palaeomagnetic age estimates by Andy Herries (La Trobe University, Australia) suggest an age of between 990,000 and 780,000 years for the main fossil bearing layers. Basal flowstone deposits are estimated to go back to around 2 million years and show evidence for the beginning of the 'Walker circulation' at around 1.7 million years ago.

=== Ficus Cave and Iron Age Site ===
The cave gets its name from the fig tree Ficus ingens roots which curtain its entrance. This cave contains Iron Age and 19th-century relics, a large bat colony and an underground lake. An Iron Age site close by yields occupational debris from approximately Early Iron Age (550 AD), 870 AD and the Late Iron Age (1560 AD). The slopes adjacent to the cave are artificially terraced and archaeological finds from these include potsherds, grindstones, hammer stones and relics of iron smelting operations, including ore, slag and fragments of tuyeres.

=== Peppercorn's Cave ===
This cave contains Iron Age and ancient relics and an underground lake. It is also home to a large colony of migratory long-fingered bats, Miniopterus schreibersii.

=== Rainbow Cave ===
This cave is situated immediately below the Historic Cave and contains the remains of several putative hearths, suggesting both human occupation and the controlled use of fire. The exposed sediments have yielded Middle Stone Age artefacts of the Pietersburg Culture of between 100,000 and 50,000 years ago. Recent studies have shown that the coloured horizons are not hearths but are more likely ancient pool deposits.

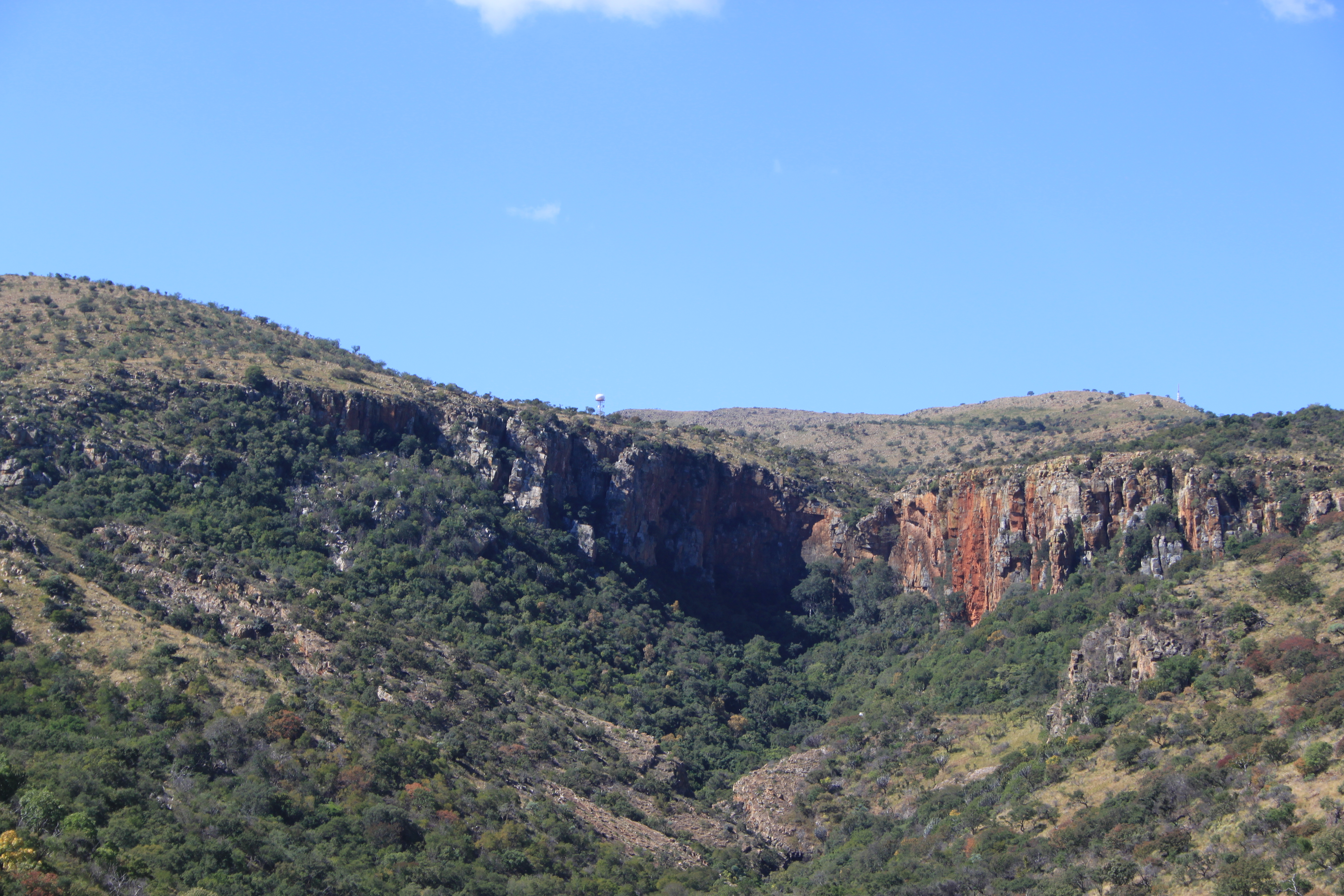
The Makapan Valley

=== Historic Cave or Makapansgat ===
This site lies immediately adjacent to the Cave of Hearths, and preserves Iron Age and Mfecane relics. It is most famous as the clash between a Boer Commando and local Langa and Kekana people after the murders of Voortrekkers at Moorddrift, Mapela and Pruizen. Chief Makapan (Mokopane), together with a large number of his tribespeople and their cattle were besieged in the cave for nearly a month between 25 October and 21 November 1854, during which time many hundreds died of hunger and thirst. Piet Potgieter was shot during the siege and the name of the nearby town was changed from Vredenburg to 'Pieter Potgietersrust', which later changed to 'Potgietersrus'. As of the early 21st century (c. early 2000s), after the transition from the Apartheid government into majority rule, there has been a trend to rename several national and provincial government institutions (including educational institutions), roads, public infrastructures, towns, cities, etc. As a result, the town has been controversially re-renamed to Mokopane, in honour of Chief Mokopane. The cave was proclaimed a National Monument in 1936.

=== Cold Air Cave ===
Stable isotope analyses of a uranium-series-dated stalagmite from Cold Air Cave provided a record of climate changes for the periods 4400–4000 years and approximately 800 years ago until the present day.

=== Gutentight Cave ===
This cave was located and explored in 2000 by A. Herries, A. Latham and W. Murzel. After breaking through a number of tight squeezes, the cave opened out into a large chamber. The floor of the chamber was covered in hearths. An inscription on the wall of the cave was from the 19th century and indicated that a previous entrance to the cave had collapsed and sealed the cavity after this date.

=== Murzel's Cave ===
This cave was located and explored in 1998 by A. Herries and A. Latham. Digging out of the entrance led to a climb and traverse down into a series of lower decorated chambers.

=== Katzenjammer Cave or Herries' Hole ===
Katzenjammer Cave is located adjacent to Peppercorn's Cave. An entrance shaft leads down to a narrow climb and entrance to a network of passages at the same level as the far reaches of Peppercorn's Cave. The entrance shaft has formed by the collapse of fossil bearing deposits (including the Giant Dasie) into the lower modern cave system, Katzenjammer Cave. The entrance shaft area and fossil deposits were collectively termed Herries' Hole by the Makapan Middle Pleistocene Research Project.

== History of discoveries in Makapansgat Valley ==
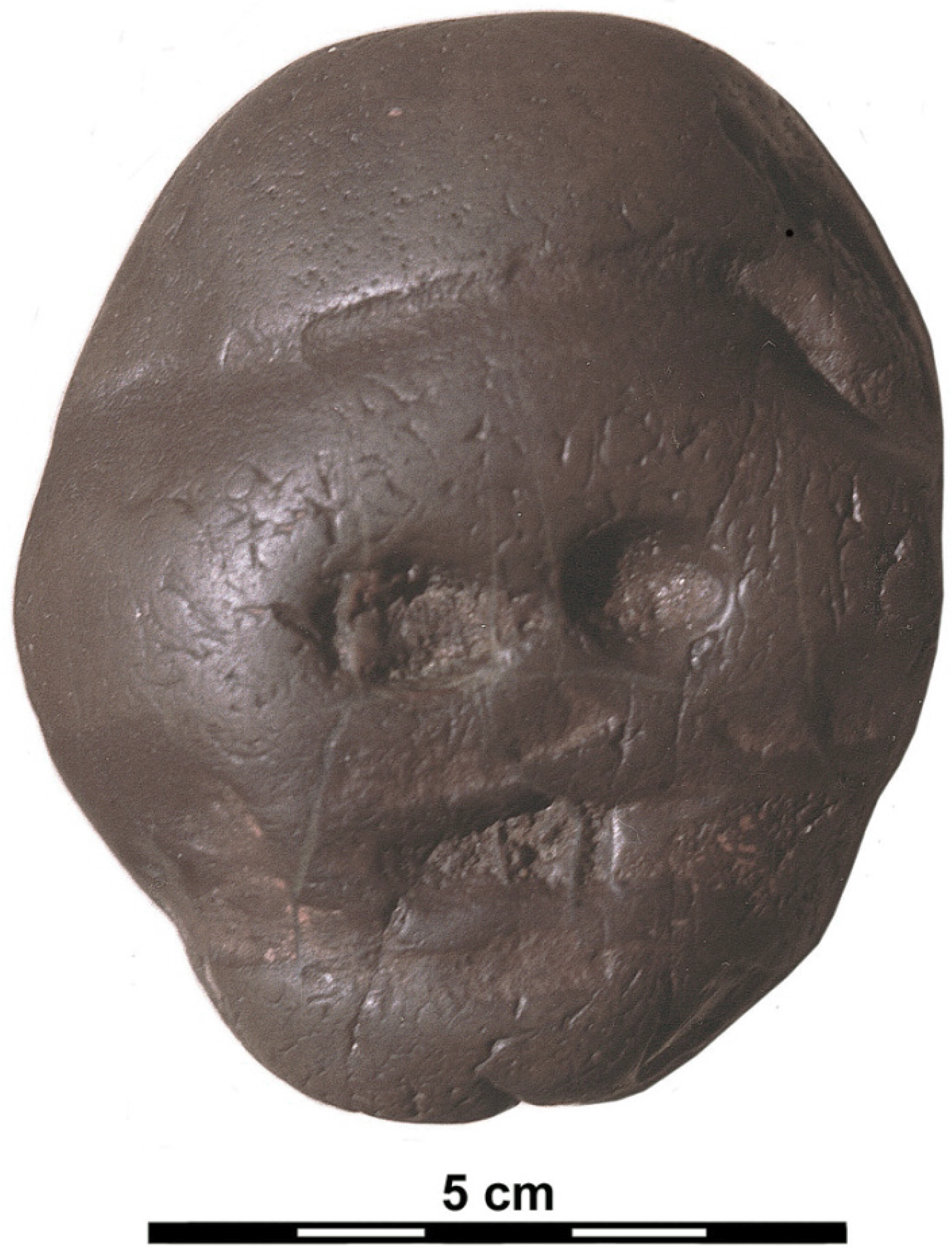
The Makapansgat Pebble, a naturally formed 'face' deposited into a cave between 4.1 and 2.1 million years ago.

Makapansgat Valley has been described as having one of the greatest palaeontological records of human evolution in the world. Collecting at the site began in 1925, when a local school teacher, Wilfred Eitzman, was attracted by the activities of limeworkers. Some fossil material was sent to Raymond Dart, who initiated a systematic investigation in 1947. Eitzman also discovered the so-called "Makapansgat pebble" associated with the bones. About 3,000,000 years ago, the pebble is shaped naturally to resemble a human face, it is thought to have been found by an Australopithecus and carried from its source into the Makapansgat cave. It has been suggested that this pebble represents the earliest known example of symbolic thinking of early hominids.

The rocks that Professor Dart received from Mr Eitzman turned out to contain, amongst others, blackened fossil bones which led him to believe that they had been burnt. Although no hominid remains or stone tools were found at first, he concluded that these were the remains of bones burnt in fireplaces and therefore that Makapansgat was a site of early hominid occupation. Dart named the first hominids discovered at the site Australopithecus prometheus after the mythological Greek hero who stole fire from the Gods. Afterwards the black markings turned out to be manganese stains and Australopithecus prometheus were recognised as specimens of Australopithecus africanus. After analysing 7,159 fossil bones, Dart concluded that these creatures, in an era before stone tools were discovered, used tools made from bone, teeth and horn, naming it the Osteodontokeratic Culture.

In 1936, the Historical Monuments Commission was asked to declare Makapan's Cave a National Monument and Professor Clarence van Riet Lowe, Secretary of the commission and Director of the Archaeological Survey of the Union of South Africa, visited the site in 1937. He inspected the Historic Cave and discovered, close by, an abandoned limeworker's adit that cut through a calcified cave infill. In this infill he saw fossil bones, stone tools, and what he took to be ash horizons representing ancient hearths. At first he referred to it as part of Makapan's Cave, but he later renamed it "The Cave of Hearths".

Further research during June and October 1937 revealed the Rainbow Cave. The site was visited by Clarence Van Riet Lowe, Raymond Dart, and Robert Broom. H. B. S. Cooke of the Geology Department of the University of the Witwatersrand conducted a geological survey of the area (1941) followed by L. C. King in 1951.

In July 1945, Philip Tobias led a group of students to the valley, where they discovered the "Hyaena Cave" next to Van Riet Lowe's site. Further down the valley, from a cave next to the limeworks, they collected a large fossil horse's lower jaw, which supplied a name for the "Cave of the Horse's Mandible".

After these discoveries, Dr Bernard Price made a research grant available for systematic excavations, which started at the Cave of Hearths in 1947, with field work being carried out by Guy Gardiner, James Kitching, and his brothers Ben and Scheepers. One of the most significant discoveries was a Homo lower jaw from Bed 3, by Ben. In 1953, Dr R. J. Mason was placed in charge of the excavations. The stratigraphic sequence was determined during 1953–1954.

After the Kitching brothers discovered an ape-man braincase amongst the limeworks dumps in 1947, Dart organised for the lime miner's dumps to be hand-sorted to recover as much fossil-bearing material as possible. After 45 years of research, many thousands of fossils from this site have been identified and catalogued.

Brian Maguire studied rocks which were brought into the caves during prehistoric times (1965, 1968, 1980). He interpreted this to represent rudimentary stone tool making activities dated at around 2.3 – 1.6 million years ago, however, recent analysis has shown this information to be incorrect.

Recent work at the sites in the late 1990s and early 2000s was done by these groups:

- the Makapansgat Fieldschool, run jointly by Kaye Reed of the Institute of Human Origins at Arizona State University (US) and Kevin Kuykendall of the University of the Witwatersrand (SA) and later the University of Sheffield (UK);
- the Makapan Middle Pleistocene Research project, run by Anthony Sinclair, Patrick Quinney of the University of Liverpool (UK) and later John McNabb of the University of Southampton (UK.).
- Alf Latham, Ginette Warr (University of Liverpool), and Andy Herries (La Trobe University, Australia) did Geochronological and stratigraphic work for both projects.

== Site locations ==
- Research house 24°08′22.1″S 29°11′59.5″E
- Makapansgat limeworks 24°08′22″S 29°11′25.6″E
- Cave of hearths 24°08′25.8″S 29°11′58.6″E
- Historic cave 24°08′28.7″S 29°11′58.9″E
- Rainbow cave 24°08′29.4″S 29°12′01.9″E
- Zwartkrans 24°07′54″S 29°11′18″E
- Buffalo cave 24°08′34.8″S 29°10′37″E
- Cold air cave 24°08′45.7″S 29°10′10.7″E

== See also ==
- Waterberg Biosphere
