= Swartkrans =

Fossil-bearing cave in South Africa

UNESCO World Heritage Site
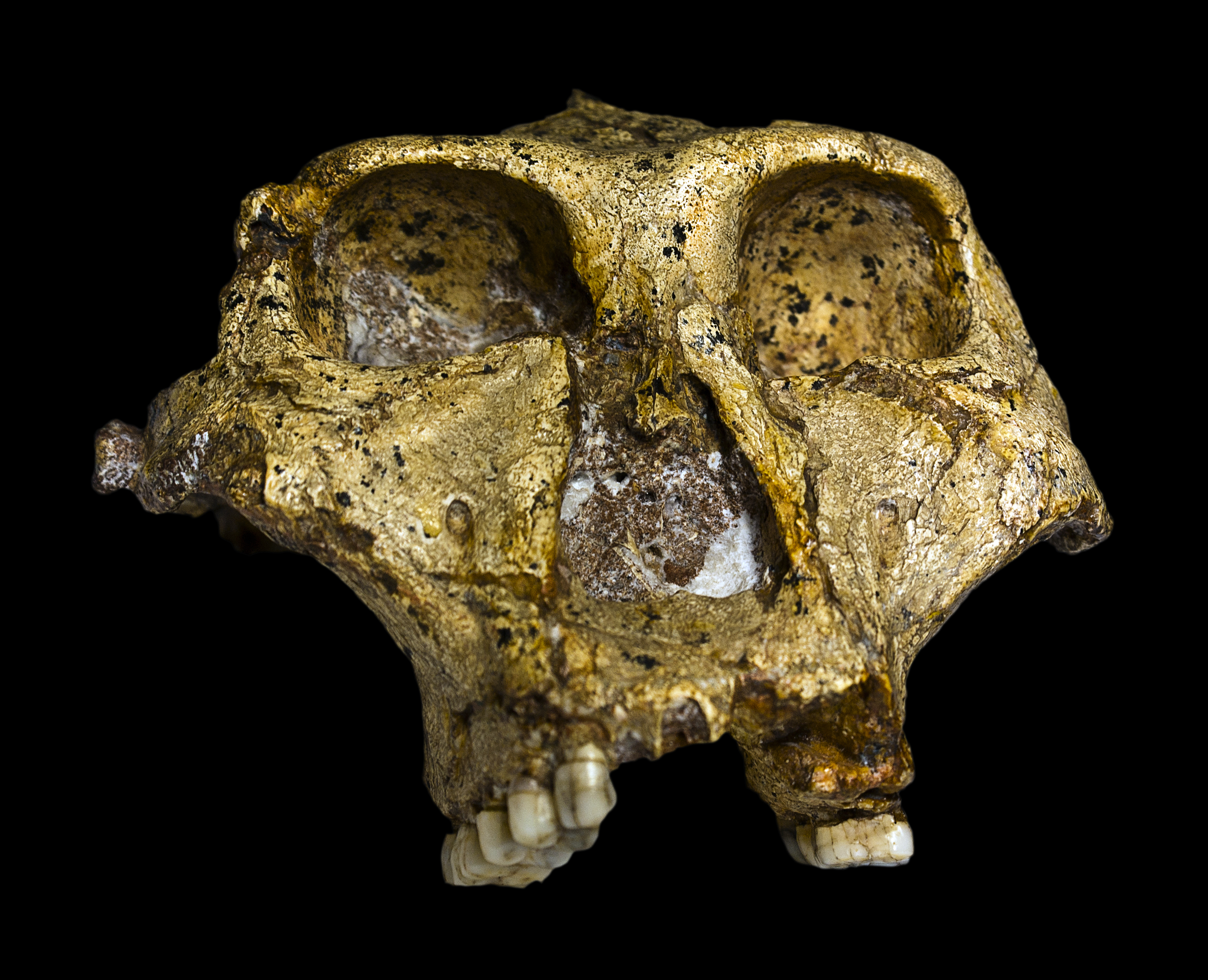

- Location within Gauteng Location within South Africa
- Location: Gauteng, South Africa
- Part of: Sterkfontein, Swartkrans, Kromdraai, and Environs part of Fossil Hominid Sites of South Africa
- Criteria: Cultural: (iii)(vi)
- Reference: 915bis-001
- Inscription: 1999 (23rd Session)
- Extensions: 2005
- Coordinates: 25°55′45″S 27°47′20″E

Swartkrans or Swartkranz is a fossil-bearing cave designated as a South African National Heritage Site, located about 32 km (20 mi) from Johannesburg. It is located in the Cradle of Humankind World Heritage Site and is notable for being extremely rich in archaeological material, particularly hominin remains. Fossils discovered in the limestone of Swartkrans include Homo ergaster (a variety of Homo erectus), Paranthropus and Homo habilis. The oldest deposits present at the site are believed to be between 1.9 and 2.1 million years old.

Noted paleontologist Robert Broom was a frequent digger. He was followed by C. K. 'Bob' Brain, whose excavations at the site inspired his book The Hunters or the Hunted? in which he demonstrated that instead of being bloodthirsty killer apes, the hominin fossils found at the site were themselves victims of predation by big cats. Originally, it was believed that Dinofelis was responsible for such killings, though recent evidence suggests that hominids were likely the victims of Megantereon or leopards based on carbon isotope ratios taken from each predator.

== History of investigations ==
Swartkrans is located on the Blaauwbank River in the Cradle of Humankind, which has a long record of some of the oldest hominin remain discoveries in the world. It is located 1 kilometre (0.62 mi) from Sterkfontein, a site that has yielded similar discoveries of the same era. The private farmland the cave was originally on was purchased by the University of the Witwatersrand in 1968.

The cave was discovered in 1948, and initial excavations were carried out by paleontologist Robert Broom. His team uncovered several remains of Paranthropus robustus and early Homo species. It was the first site at which both Paranthropus and Homo had been found together, indicating that they were contemporary.

Excavation then halted until the mid-1960s and continued until the 1980s, when C. K. Brain brought a team to Swartkrans. Thousands of artifacts and faunal remains were uncovered, 415 of which are considered to be hominin. Brain expanded upon the site's stratigraphy, which was more complex than previously thought.

== Discoveries ==
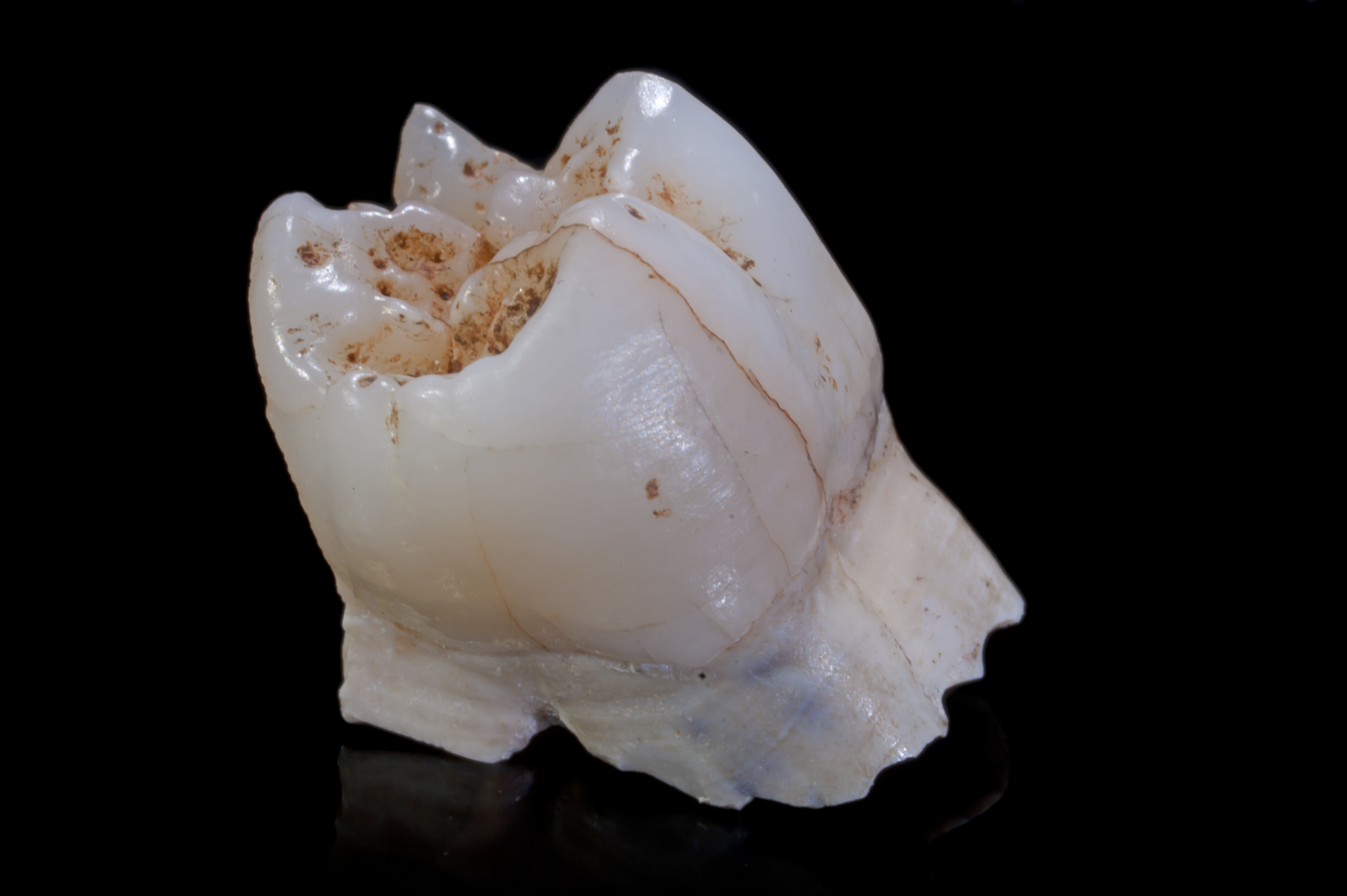
Tooth of SKX 268.

Some of the earliest evidence of controlled use of fire by humans can be found at Swartkrans, up to 1.5 million years ago.

In addition, some of the earliest evidence of modified bone tools has also been found at Swartkrans and Sterkfontein, with the oldest at Swartkrans dating to about 1.8 million years ago. These tools may have been made by Australopithecus robustus or an early species of Homo, which both inhabited the cave around the same time.

These early tools were first speculated to have been used to dig up tubers, but they may instead have been used to harvest termites, which were present during Swartkrans's occupation; many of these tools may have been multipurpose. Re-evaluation of wear on stone and bone tools uncovered by Brain in earlier excavations and experiments by researchers have led to the conclusion that termites, a high source of nutrients, were a supplementary food source for early hominids. Bone tools would have allowed for easier extraction of the insects than stones would have.

In 2016, the discovery of the earliest known evidence of cancer in hominins was announced. An osteosarcoma was found on a partial left fifth metatarsal from an unclassified hominin.

== Geology ==
Swartkrans is a limestone cave and has been divided geologically into five members. Member 1 consists of two large masses, named the Hanging Remnant and Lower Bank. Homo ergaster and Paranthropus robustus remains have been found in Member 1, and Member 2 has yielded the same genera.

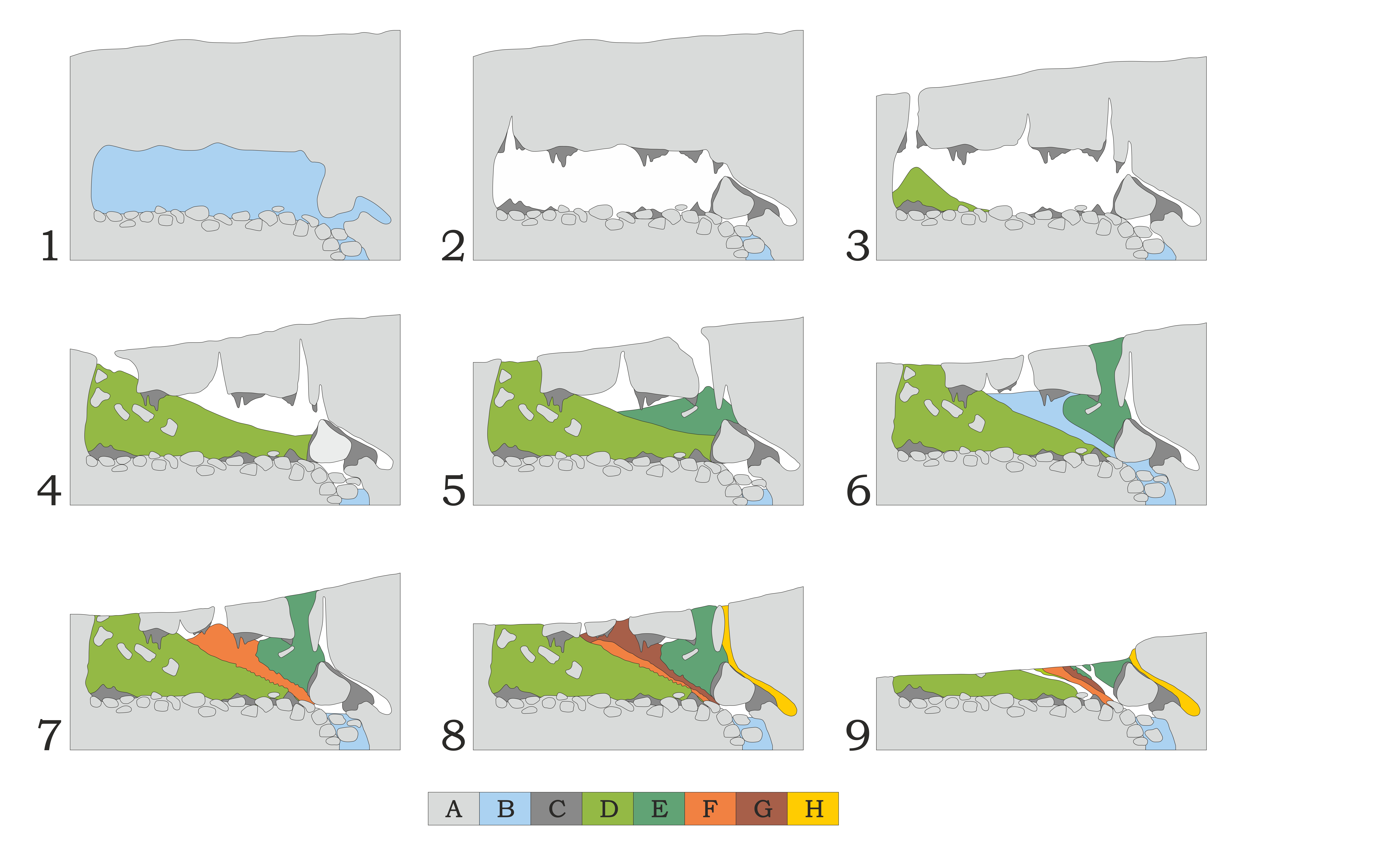
Stages of Swartkrans Cave site formation - A - Dolomite; B - Water; C - Travertine; D - Member 1 (Lower Bank); E - Member 1 (Hanging Remnant); F - Member 2; G - Member 3; H - Stratified Member 2
