= Howieson's Poort Shelter =

Rock shelter in Eastern Cape, South Africa

- location in South Africa
- 33°34′47″S 26°1′6″E
- Location: on the north side of the Howieson's Poort
- Region: South Africa

Howieson's Poort Shelter is a small rock shelter in South Africa containing the archaeological site from which the Howiesons Poort period in the Middle Stone Age gets its name. This period lasted around 5,000 years, between roughly 65,800 BP and 59,500 BP. This period is important as it, together with the Stillbay period 7,000 years earlier, provides the first evidence of human symbolism and technological skills that were later to appear in the Upper Paleolithic.

== Naming ==
The poort was named after a "Mr Howison" but it was misspelt by Stapleton and Hewitt as Howieson and their error has been used ever since for the stone tool industry named after it. Note the site is always spelled with an apostrophe but the period can be spelt variably with and without it.

== Description ==
The rock shelter occurs in a hill on the north side of the Howieson's Poort containing the main road into Grahamstown from Port Elizabeth. The cave is halfway up a cliff and is 7 m (23 ft) deep and 5.5 m (18 ft) wide at the mouth, with a large Real Yellowwood tree growing in the deposit and "bent horizontal with the floor to allow its branches to spread into the open at the mouth of the shelter". The original Howiesons Poort period remains were covered very slowly due to the cave's position halfway up the cliff and to wind clearance. 20,000 years ago, however, a rock fall acted to protect the deposits near the front from wind erosion.

== Excavation ==
It was excavated in the late 1920s, and then again in 1965 by Hilary and Janette Deacon. There are very little in situ deposits left.

All the artifacts at the Howieson's Poort site were found below a barren layer about a foot thick in a black layer also about a foot thick. The stone tools were mostly large segments or 'crescents', obliquely backed blades and unifacial and bifacial points. There are no rock paintings, nor bone or shell artifacts, though bone and shell artifacts are found in the deposits elsewhere of the Howiesons Poort period. Stone tools similar to those in the cave have been collected from hillsides above the rock shelter.

Originally, and until the mid-1970s, the remains at Howiesons Poort Shelter were thought to belong to the Magosian period and so intermediate in time and technology between the Middle Stone Age and Late Stone Age. However, optically stimulated luminescence dating pushed back dates for occupation by this period to 65,800 BP and 59,500 BP.

Apart from the Howiesons Poort period, Deacon proposed that the cave may have been occupied more recently for several very short periods (ca. 18-19000 BP, ca. 9-10000 BP and ca. 3-4000 BP) by people who made fires but left few or no artefacts. However, this explanation is presented only as one of a number of possible scenarios.

== See also ==
- Blombos Cave
- Klasies River Caves
- Diepkloof Rock Shelter
- Sibudu Cave
- List of caves in South Africa
