= Lyn Wadley =

South African archaeologist

- Education: University of Cape Town; University of the Witwatersrand
- Known for: early humans cognitive
- Scientific career
- Fields: Archaeology
- Workplaces: University of the Witwatersrand
- Thesis: A Social And Ecological Interpretation Of The Later Stone Age In The Southern Transvaal. (1986)

Lyn Wadley is an honorary professor of archaeology, and also affiliated jointly with the Archaeology Department and the Institute for Evolution at the University of the Witwatersrand in Johannesburg, South Africa.

== Education ==
Wadley received her master's degree from the University of Cape Town in 1977, and her PhD from the University of the Witwatersrand in 1986.

== Career ==
Wadley taught in the School of Geography, Archaeology and Environmental Studies and the Evolutionary Studies Institute, University of the Witwatersrand from 1982 to 2004. Wadley began her career researching social and ecological issues in the Later Stone Age in South Africa. This included the first considerations of gender in the archaeological record of Southern Africa, as articulated by Mazel "this has firmly placed the study of gender on the South African archaeological map". She directed excavations at multiple Holocene sites in Magaliesberg and then began working on older, Pleistocene sites. Professor Wadley spent eleven years excavating the Rose Cottage Cave in the Eastern Free State. From 1998-2011, her excavations at Sibudu Rock Shelter in KwaZulu-Natal led to a series of insights and publications about early human cognitive ability. Wadley has claimed that the relationship between the use of compound adhesives and compound paints is clear evidence for modern thought processes, including multi-tasking, found in South Africa 100,000 years ago. Although she retired from the university, she still supervises Ph.D students. She has led an archaeologist team at the Sibudu rock shelter in KwaZulu-Natal, and has uncovered new evidence for early humans' cognitive ability. She is listed on the Thomson Reuters list of highly cited researchers. In July 2019 she was elected as Fellow of the British Academy.

== Research areas ==
In her Ph.D. research she developed a model of the social organisation of Holocene Later Stone Age hunter-gatherers focussing on seasonal aggregation and dispersal of groups. By excavations she identified a possible aggregation site, Jubilee shelter, and a possible dispersal site, Cave James.

After her Ph.D. she started excavating Rose Cottage Cave in the Free State province. Her research focused on the Holocene and Pleistocene Later Stone Age and on the Middle Stone Age. The excavations yielded important data on the technological organisation of the Middle Stone Age Howiesons Poort industry and on the cognitive complexity of modern human behaviour during this part of the Middle Stone Age.

Wadley is the director of the research unit ACACIA (Ancient Cognition and Culture in Africa) in the University of the Witwatersrand. The goal of this research unit is to examine issues of cognition and culture in the Middle Stone Age in South Africa. For the past 12 years, Sibudu Cave in KwaZulu-Natal provided the archaeological material analysed by the ACACIA staff and graduate students. Wadley also conducted experimental archaeology to understand technical processes which were adopted during the times of the Middle Stone Age.

== Published work ==
- Wadley, Lyn; Esteban, Irene; de la Peña, Paloma; Wojcieszak, Marine; Stratford, Dominic; Lennox, Sandra; d’Errico, Francesco; Rosso, Daniela Eugenia; Orange, François; Backwell, Lucinda; Sievers, Christine (13 August 2020). "Fire and grass-bedding construction 200 thousand years ago at Border Cave, South Africa" (PDF). Science. 369 (6505). American Association for the Advancement of Science (AAAS): 863–866. Bibcode:2020Sci...369..863W. doi:10.1126/science.abc7239. ISSN 0036-8075. PMID 32792402. S2CID 221113832.
- Backwell, Lucinda; Wojcieszak, Marine; Wadley, Lyn (21 July 2020). "The effect of heat on keratin and implications for the archaeological record". Archaeological and Anthropological Sciences. 12 (8). Springer Science and Business Media LLC: 181. Bibcode:2020ArAnS..12..181B. doi:10.1007/s12520-020-01152-9. hdl:11336/142472. ISSN 1866-9557. S2CID 220681405.
- Wadley, Lyn; Backwell, Lucinda; d’Errico, Francesco; Sievers, Christine (2 January 2020). "Cooked starchy rhizomes in Africa 170 thousand years ago". Science. 367 (6473). American Association for the Advancement of Science (AAAS): 87–91. Bibcode:2020Sci...367...87W. doi:10.1126/science.aaz5926. hdl:11336/142825. ISSN 0036-8075. PMID 31896717.
- Soriano, S.; Villa, P.; Wadley, L. (2007). "Blade technology and tool forms in the Middle Stone Age of South Africa: the Howiesons Poort and post-Howiesons Poort at Rose Cottage Cave". Journal of Archaeological Science. 34 (5): 681–703. Bibcode:2007JArSc..34..681S. doi:10.1016/j.jas.2006.06.017.
- Wadley, L (2001). "What is Cultural Modernity? A General View and a South African Perspective from Rose Cottage Cave". Cambridge Archaeological Journal. 11 (2): 201–221. doi:10.1017/S0959774301000117.
- Wadley, L.; Harper, P. (1989). "Rose Cottage Cave Revisited: Malan's Middle Stone Age". South African Archaeological Bulletin. 44: 23–32. doi:10.2307/3888316. JSTOR 3888316.
- Wadley, Lyn (1987). "Later Stone Age hunters and gatherers of the southern Transvaal: social and ecological interpretation". British Archaeological Reports. 25.
- Wadley, Lyn (1986). A Social And Ecological Interpretation Of The Later Stone Age In The Southern Transvaal (Ph.D). University of the Witwatersrand.
