= List of caves in South Africa =

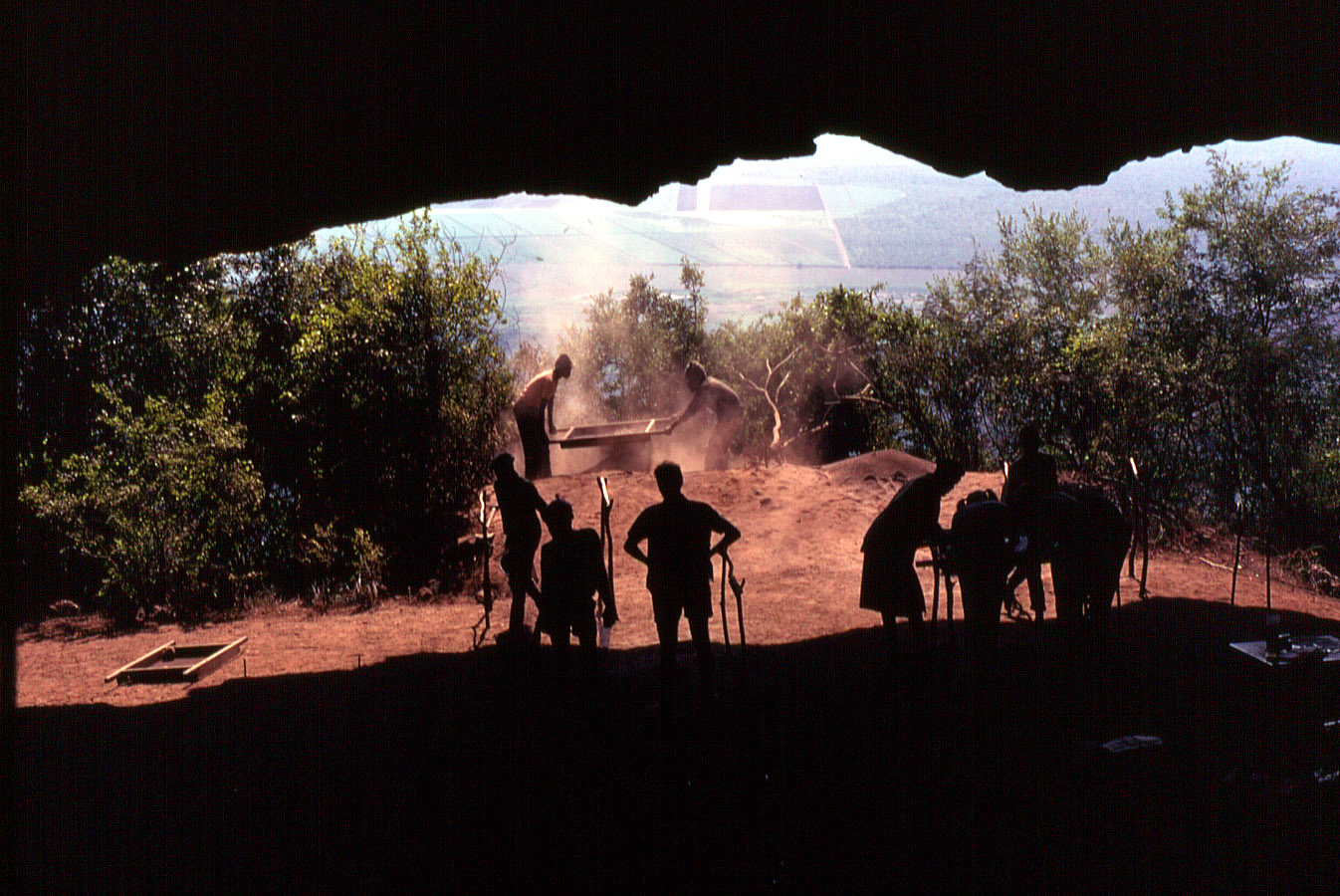
View from mouth of Border Cave

This is a list of caves of in South Africa. A cave or cavern is a natural underground space large enough for a human to enter. The term may refer to sea caves, rock shelters, and grottos.

== List of caves in South Africa ==
Name of Caves	Other Names	Province	Nearest Town	Coördinates	Remarks
Blombos Cave		Western Cape	Heidelberg	34°24′50.77″S 21°13′03.68″E	
Boesmansgat	Bushman's Hole	Northern Cape	Daniëlskuil	27°55′18″S 23°38′30″E	
Boomplaas Cave		Western Cape	Oudtshoorn	33°22′14″S 22°9′31″E	
Border Cave		KwaZulu-Natal	Ingwavuma	27°01′33″S 31°59′20″E	
Cango Caves		Western Cape	Oudtshoorn	33°23′33″S 22°12′53″E	
Cooper's Cave		Gauteng	Sterkfontein Kromdraai	26°00′46″S 27°44′45″E	
De Kelders		Western Cape	Gansbaai		
Diepkloof Rock Shelter		Western Cape		32°23′12″S 18°27′10″E	
Echo Caves		Limpopo	Ohrigstad	24.5619757°S 30.6033611°E	
Elands Bay Cave		Western Cape		32°19′03.5″S 18°19′04.6″E	
Gladysvale Cave		Gauteng	Sterkfontein Swartkrans		
Gondolin Cave		North West			
Howieson's Poort Shelter		Eastern Cape	Grahamstown		
Klasies River Caves		Eastern Cape	Humansdorp		
Kromdraai Fossil Site		Gauteng	Sterkfontein		
Makapansgat	Makapan's Cave	Limpopo	Mokopane		
Melkhoutboom Cave		Eastern Cape			
Motsetsi Cave	Motsetse	Gauteng	Sterkfontein Kromdraai		
Nelson Bay Cave		Western Cape	Plettenberg Bay	34°06′10″S 23°22′30″E	
Onmeetbarediepgat		Western Cape	Bredasdorp		
Pinnacle Point		Western Cape	Mossel Bay	34°12′28″S 22°05′22″E	
Plovers Lake		Gauteng	Sterkfontein Kromdraai		
Sterkfontein		Gauteng	Sterkfontein		
Sibudu Cave		KwaZulu-Natal	Tongaat	29.522627°S 31.085895°E	
Stadsaal Caves		Western Cape			
Sudwala Caves		Mpumalanga	Nelspruit		
Rose Cottage Cave		Free State	Ladybrand	29°12′25.6896″S 27°27′16.7832″E	
Wonder Cave Kromdraai		Gauteng	Sterkfontein Kromdraai		
Wonderwerk Cave		Northern Cape	Kuruman		

== See also ==
- Cave diving – Diving in water-filled caves
- Caving – Recreational pastime of exploring cave systems
- List of caves
- List of South African caving organisations
- Speleology – Science of cave and karst systems
