= Te Matuku Marine Reserve =

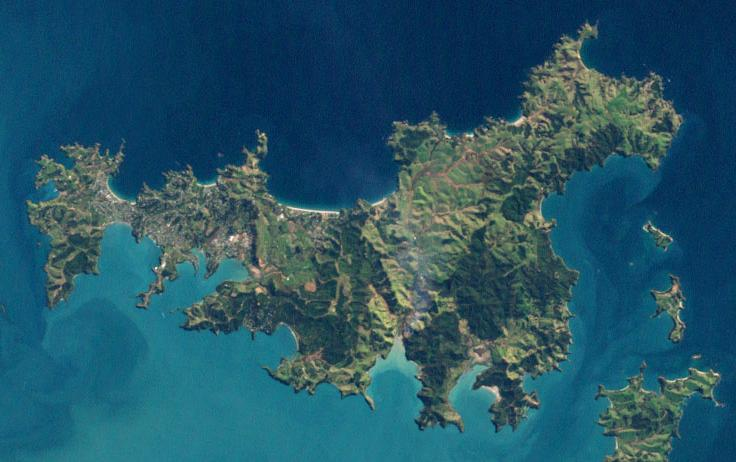
- Te Matuku Marine Reserve includes the southern-most bay and the surrounding area of sea

- Location within North Island
- Location: Waiheke Island, Hauraki Gulf, New Zealand
- Coordinates: 36°50′33″S 175°07′48″E
- Area: 690 ha (1,700 acres)
- Established: 2003
- Governing body: Department of Conservation

Te Matuku Marine Reserve is a marine reserve administered by the New Zealand Department of Conservation. It includes Te Matuku Bay, one of the largest and least disturbed estuaries on Waiheke Island, as well as a surrounding area of sea. It covers an area of 690 ha (1,700 acres) and was established in 2003.

The bay and marine reserve are named after the now-rare matuku or Australasian bittern.

== Geography ==
The marine reserve includes both the main bay and its entrance bays (Whites Bay, Little Bay, Sandy Bay and Otakawhe Bay) up to the high water line, and then out line level with Kauri Point on Ponui Island (Chamberlins Island).

The sand, mudflats, mangroves and saltmarsh of Te Matuku Bay provides a habitat for eel grass, sea snails, cockles, crabs and worms, including colonies of spiny tubeworm (Pomatoceros caeruleus) that also used to be common in the inner Waitemata Harbour. During low tide, the bay almost dries out, allowing wading birds to hunt for these animals. During high tide, young flounder and mullet move in to feed on the invertebrates.

On the eastern side of the bay are small shell spits, which provide roosting and nesting areas for native and migrating shorebirds. Godwits, red knot, wrybill, South Island oystercatcher and New Zealand dotterel are most common; banded dotterel, white-fronted tern, reef heron, spotless crake and Australasian bittern have also been found in smaller numbers.

Rig (spotted dogfish) and flatfish are common within the bay. Crayfish, banded kōkopu and New Zealand longfin eel live in the freshwater streams into the bay.

The forest vegetation on the hillslopes surrounding the bay includes a mix of mature and regenerating coastal broadleaved forest; kauri, podocarp and broadleaved forest; and kanuka forest and scrub. It provides a habitat for kererū, grey warbler, silvereye, tūī, fantail, kingfisher, and morepork, and are part of the seasonal migration of kākā and shining cuckoo.

The rocky shores and gravel beaches at the entrance to the bay are a habitat for common seashore snails, chitons, acorn barnacles, small black mussels and tubeworms. However, the introduced Pacific oyster has also been colonising the area.

The reserve also extends out of the bay to the sandy muds in the Tāmaki Strait and around Passage Rock. The water around the rock is a habitat for horse mussels, large seaweeds, crayfish and snapper. Tarāpunga (red-billed gulls), karoro (black-backed gulls), tara (white-fronted terns) and kawau paka (little shags) all nest on Passage Rock.

The reserve also includes deeper areas off Ōtakawhe Bay at the entrance to Waiheke Channel, where tidal currents expose shell patches that sponges, anemones and soft corals colonise.

== History ==
In pre-European times, the bay was an important food-gathering and waka landing area for Māori, particularly Ngāti Paoa. It remains historically, spiritually and culturally important.

The reserve was established in 2003. A pre-existing oyster farm within the deeper waters of the reserve was excluded from the technical description of the reserve.

Twelve people were charged with unlawfully taking marine life from the reserve in 2020.

== Recreation ==
A range of activities are banned in the marine reserve, including fishing, taking or killing marine life, and moving or removing any marine life or materials. People must not feed fish as it disturbs their natural behaviour, and they must take care when anchoring to avoid damaging the sea floor.

Swimming, diving, boating and kayaking are all permitted within the reserve. Snorkelling is also allowed, but the tidal bay is often murky and not always suitable for snorkelling.

Walking is also possible in the bay, but some cliff-top sections can be hazardous and some parts of the track are steep. Walkers need good walking footwear and all-weather gear, and must keep to the tracks and respect private property. Lighting fires is not permitted.

== See also ==
- Marine reserves of New Zealand
