= Lucinda Backwell =

South African archaeologist

Lucinda Ruth Backwell
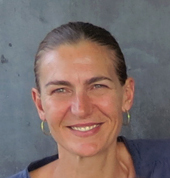
- Born: 2 September 1966
- Education: PhD, Msc University of the Witwatersrand; University of Bordeaux
- Scientific career
- Fields: Paleoanthropology, archaeology
- Workplaces: University of the Witwatersrand
- Thesis: Early Hominid Bone Tool Industries (2004)
- Doctoral advisor: Lee Berger; Francesco d'Errico
- Website: www.lucindabackwell.com

Lucinda Backwell (born 1966) is an archaeologist and a member of the Academy of Science of South Africa. She obtained her MSc in palaeoanthropology (cum laude) from the University of the Witwatersrand Medical School in 2000. Her PhD in palaeoanthropology was awarded in 2004, making her the first South African woman to be awarded a PhD in palaeoanthropology at a local institution.

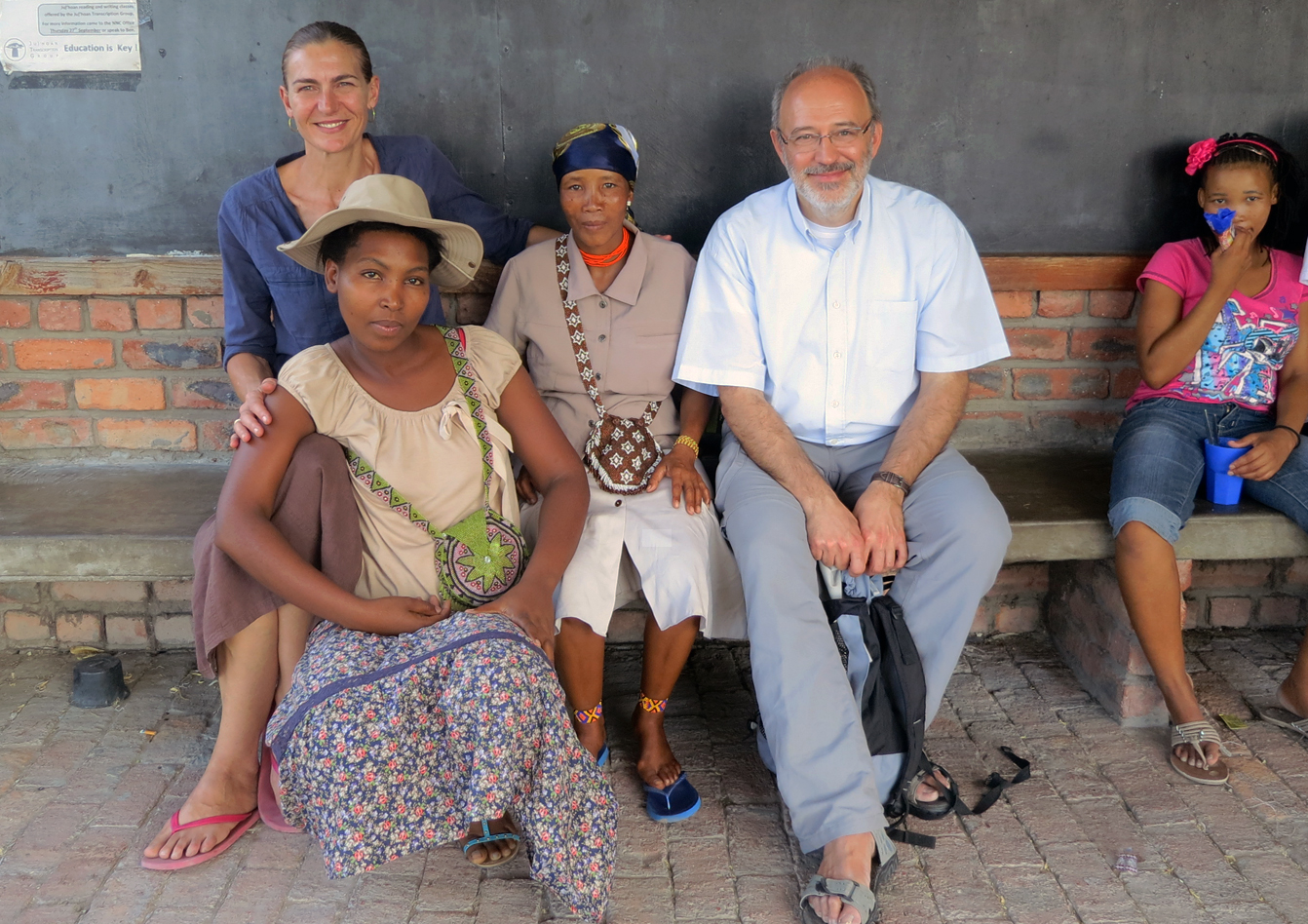
Lucinda Backwell (back left) and Francesco d'Errico (University of Bordeaux) with friends Mansweta Heinrich (forefront) and Xoa//'an /ai!ae from Tsumkwe, Namibia.

In 2011, she was promoted to senior researcher at the Evolutionary Studies Institute of the University of the Witwatersrand, where she taught introductory courses on human evolution and taphonomy, and supervised postgraduates on various topics, including fossil assemblages from caves in the Cradle of Humankind. In 2017, she moved to Argentina and took up a position at CONICET. She is associated with the Grupo de Investigación en Arqueología Andina (ARQAND), Facultad de Ciencias Naturales e Instituto Miguel Lillo, Universidad Nacional de Tucumán. She has been published 50 times and has been involved in 11 documentaries. Her research interests include taphonomy, archaeology, paleontology and ethnoarchaeology.

== Research interests ==
- Vertebrate taphonomy and the fossil record

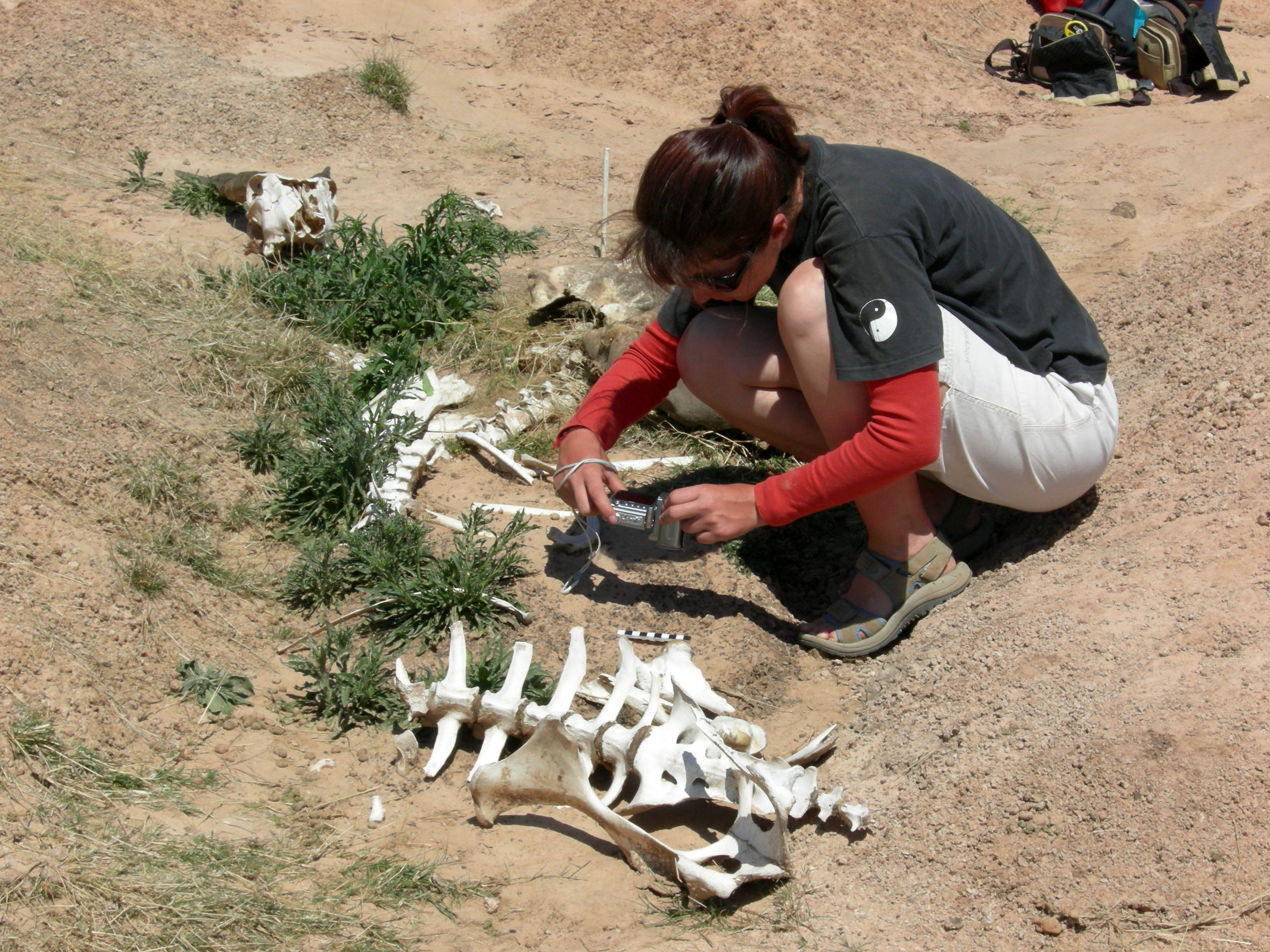
Taphonomic study of an eland carcass from time of death, Free State, South Africa.

- Early hominin cultural and behavioural evolution
- Tracing the emergence of modern human behaviour
- Correlating archaeology, palaeontology and climate change
- Ethnoarchaeology amongst Kalahari San
- Origin(s) of ritual mortuary practice

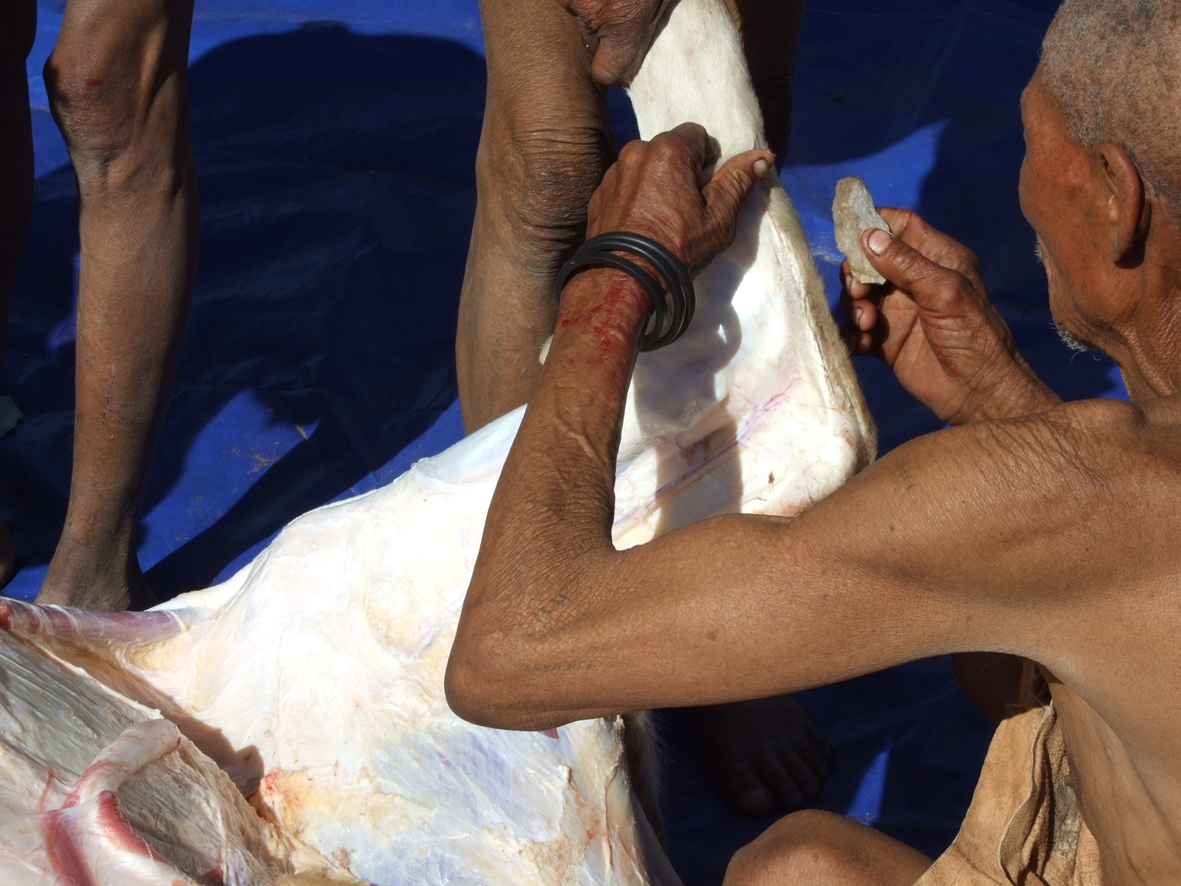
Large mammal butchering experiment using stone tools, Kacgae, Botswana.

== Main fields of specialisation ==
- Origin and evolution of bone tool technology

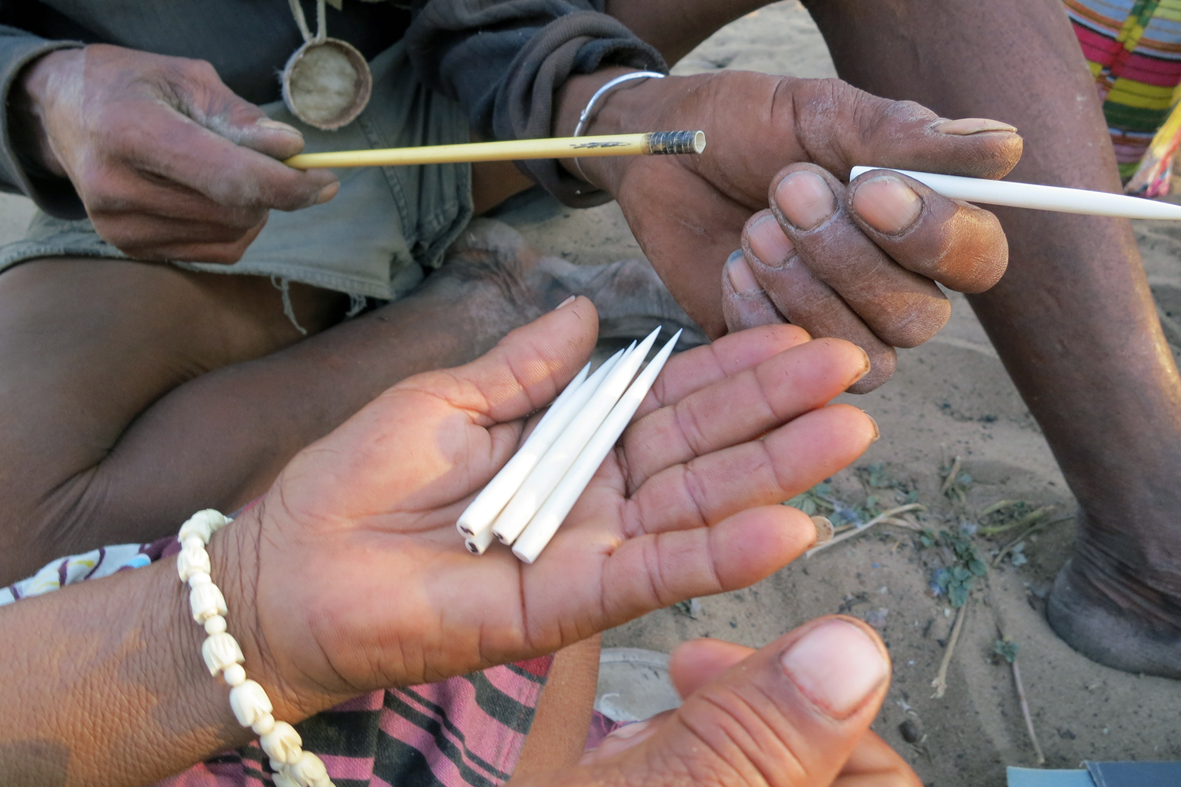
Bow and bone arrow experiment, Tsumkwe, Namibia.

- Microscopic analysis of bone surface modifications
- San material culture, past and present

== Current research ==
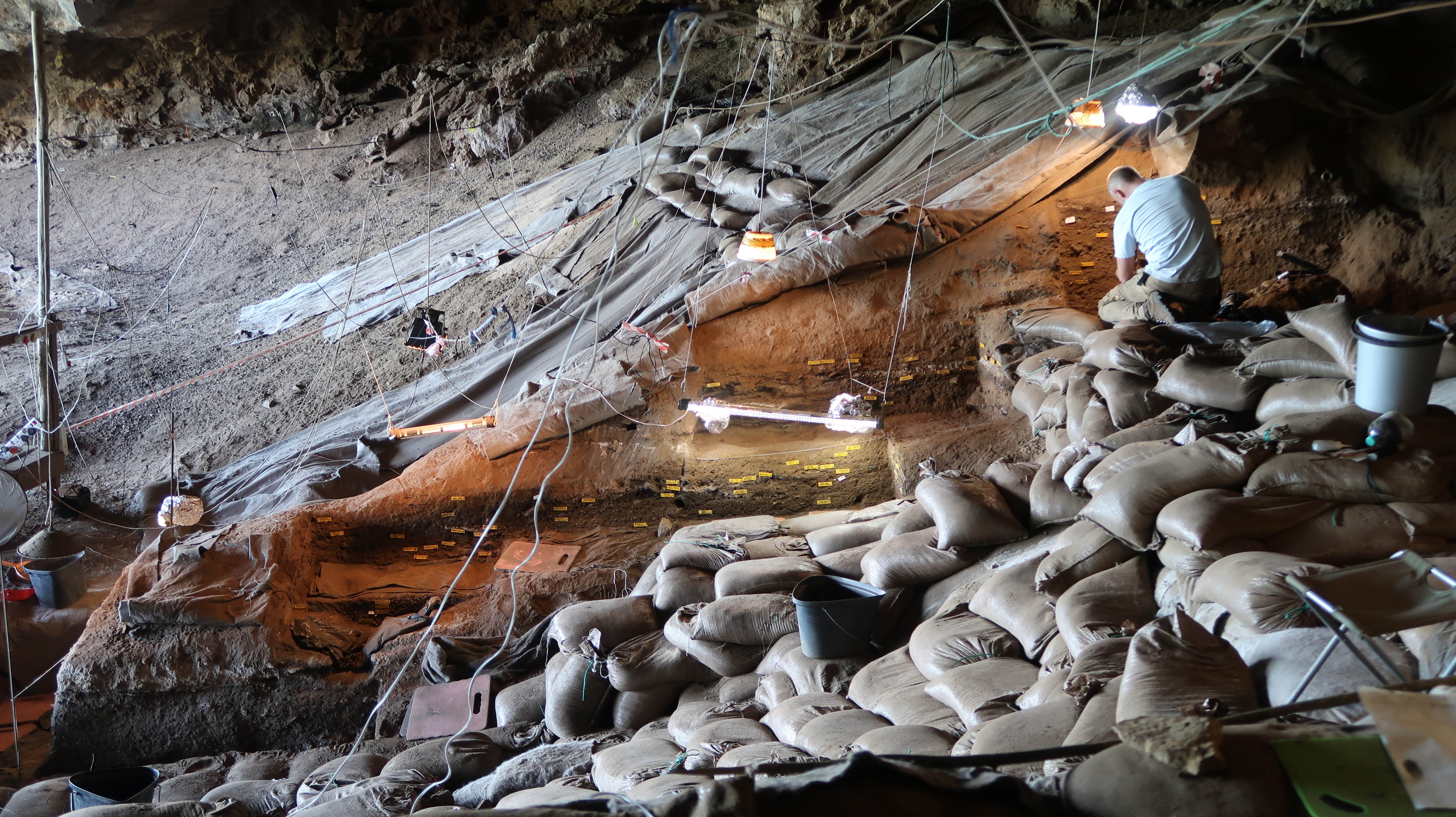
Excavations at Border Cave showing stratigraphy on the North section of the site

- Border Cave, Middle Stone Age site excavation and analysis, KwaZulu-Natal, South Africa.
- Experimental taphonomy: ongoing invertebrate modification of bone in South Africa.
- Experimental taphonomy: refining the functional interpretation of early hominin bone tools; new experiments and texture analyses.
- Longitudinal studies of modern mammal carcass modification, disarticulation, dispersal and burial in a semi-arid grassland environment in South Africa.
- Description of Middle Stone Age bone artefacts from Sibudu Cave, South Africa.

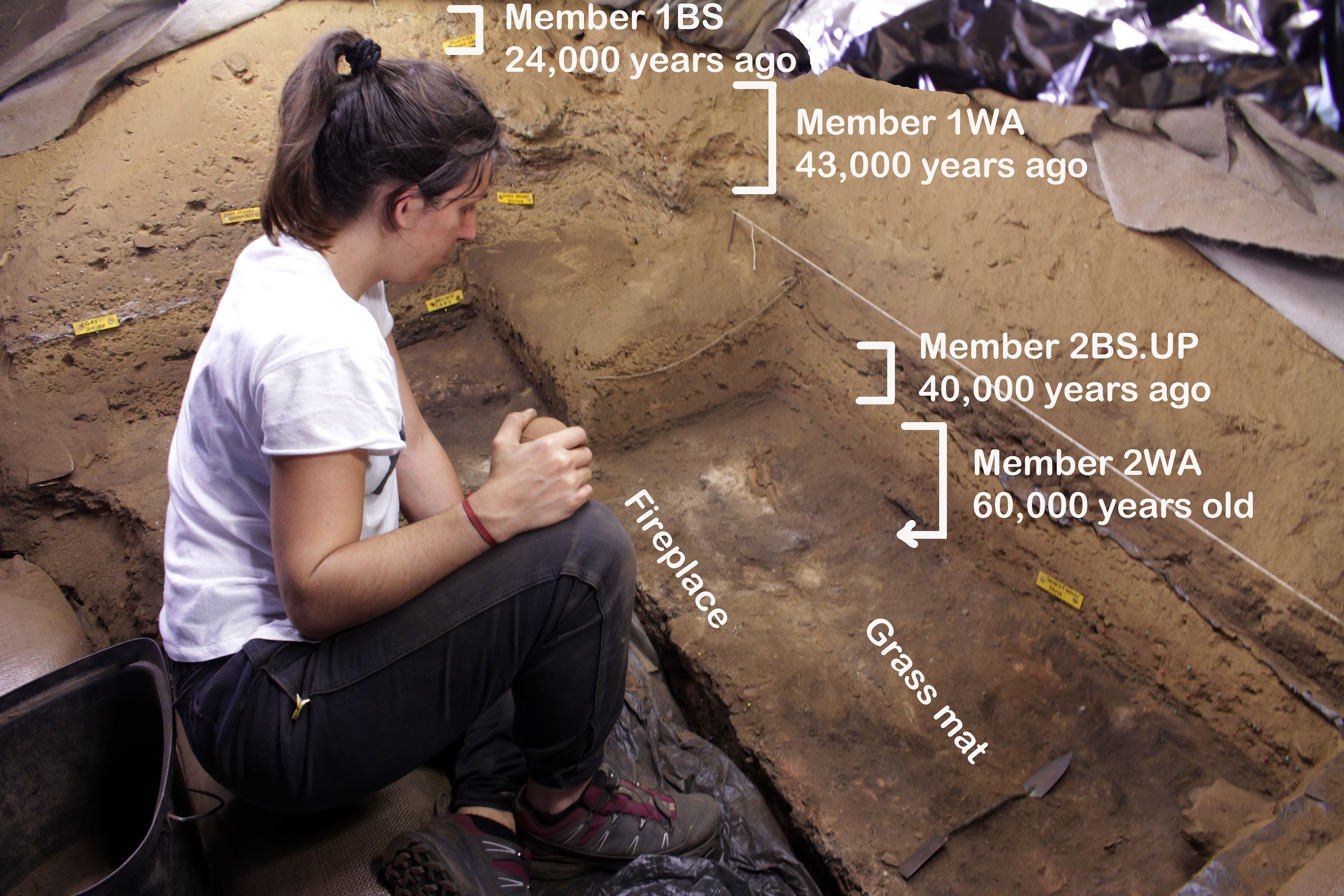
Early Later Stone Age layers at Border Cave

- Holocene mortuary practices in Northwest Argentina.

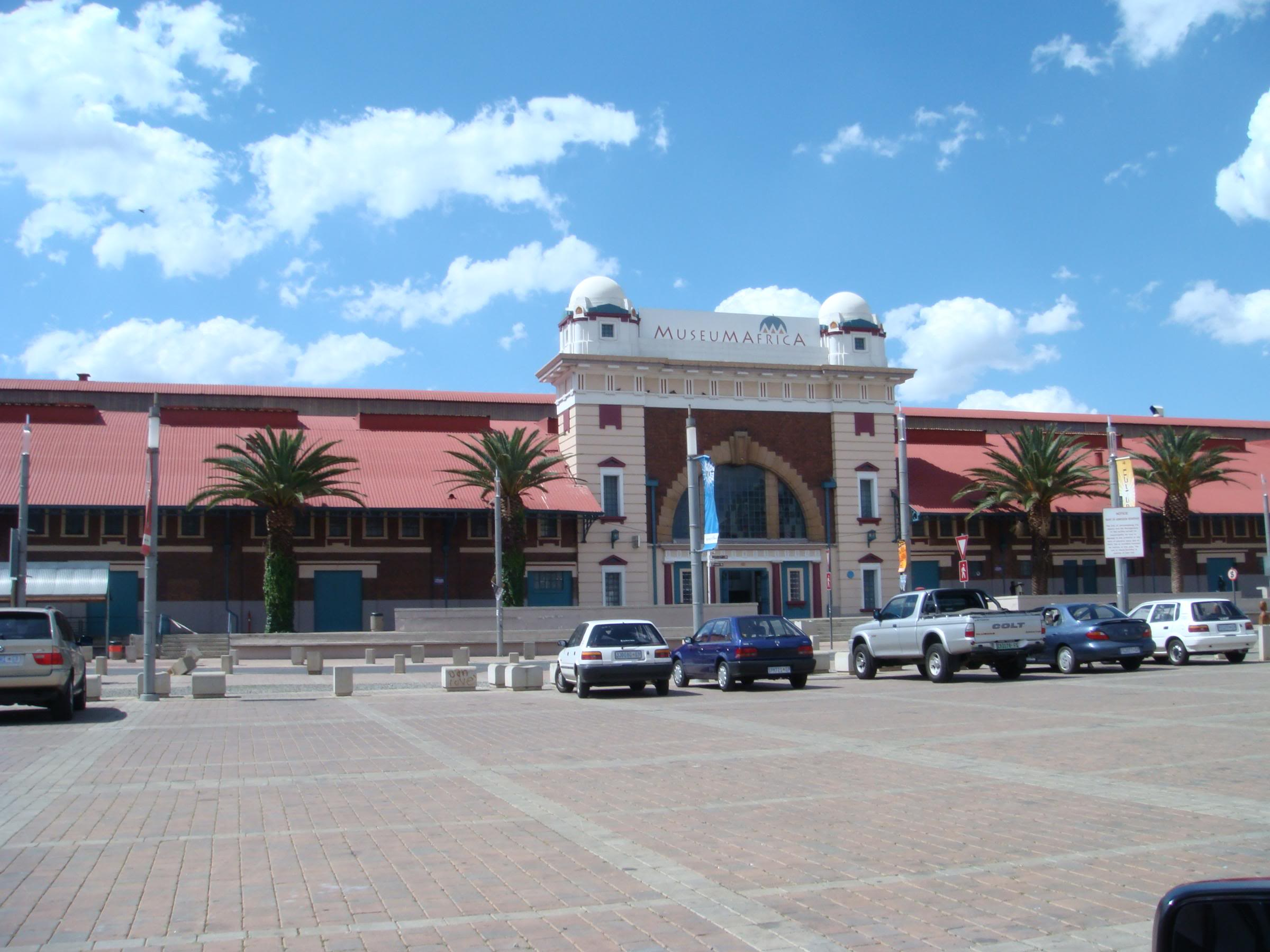
Museum Africa, Johannesburg, South Africa

== Selected publications ==
=== Journals ===
- Backwell, Lucinda; Huchet, Jean-Bernard; Jashashvili, Tea; Dirks, Paul H.G.M.; Berger, Lee R. (2020). "Termites and necrophagous insects associated with early Pleistocene (Gelasian) Australopithecus sediba at Malapa, South Africa". Palaeogeography, Palaeoclimatology, Palaeoecology. 560 109989. Elsevier BV. Bibcode:2020PPP...56009989B. doi:10.1016/j.palaeo.2020.109989. hdl:11336/142848. ISSN 0031-0182. S2CID 225325526.
- Wadley, Lyn; Esteban, Irene; de la Peña, Paloma; Wojcieszak, Marine; Stratford, Dominic; Lennox, Sandra; d'Errico, Francesco; Rosso, Daniela Eugenia; Orange, François; Backwell, Lucinda; Sievers, Christine (13 August 2020). "Fire and grass-bedding construction 200 thousand years ago at Border Cave, South Africa" (PDF). Science. 369 (6505). American Association for the Advancement of Science (AAAS): 863–866. Bibcode:2020Sci...369..863W. doi:10.1126/science.abc7239. ISSN 0036-8075. PMID 32792402. S2CID 221113832.
- Backwell, Lucinda; Wojcieszak, Marine; Wadley, Lyn (21 July 2020). "The effect of heat on keratin and implications for the archaeological record". Archaeological and Anthropological Sciences. 12 (8). Springer Science and Business Media LLC: 181. Bibcode:2020ArAnS..12..181B. doi:10.1007/s12520-020-01152-9. hdl:11336/142472. ISSN 1866-9557. S2CID 220681405.
- Wadley, Lyn; Backwell, Lucinda; d'Errico, Francesco; Sievers, Christine (2 January 2020). "Cooked starchy rhizomes in Africa 170 thousand years ago". Science. 367 (6473). American Association for the Advancement of Science (AAAS): 87–91. Bibcode:2020Sci...367...87W. doi:10.1126/science.aaz5926. hdl:11336/142825. ISSN 0036-8075. PMID 31896717.

=== Books ===
- Backwell, Lucinda; d'Errico, F. (2021). San elders speak: ancestral knowledge of the Kalahari San. Johannesburg: Wits University Press. ISBN 978-1-77614-664-2. OCLC 1255871916.
- d'Errico, F.; Backwell, Lucinda (2005). From tools to symbols: From early hominids to modern humans. Johannesburg: Witwatersrand University Press. ISBN 1-86814-434-8. OCLC 70129332. Proceedings of a conference in honour of Professor Phillip Tobias.

=== Chapters in books ===
- Backwell, L. R.; Huchet, J.-B.; du Guesclin Harrison, J.; d'Errico, F. (2021). "Invertebrate modification of bone". In J. T. Pokines; S. A. Symes (eds.). Manual of Forensic Taphonomy. Boca Raton, FL: CRC Press.
- Backwell, L.; d'Errico, F.; de la Pena, P.; Wadley, L. "Border Cave, South Africa.". In D. Olszewski, D. Wright; J. Wilkins; A. Bouzouggar; A. Beyin (eds.). Handbook of Pleistocene Archaeology of Africa: Hominin behavior, geography, and chronology. The Netherlands: Springer.
- Backwell, L.R.; d'Errico, F. (2016). "Osseous projectile weaponry from Early – Late Middle Stone Age Africa". In M.C. Langley (ed.). Vertebrate Paleobiology and Paleoanthropology - Osseous Projectile Weaponry. Dordrecht: Springer Netherlands. doi:10.1007/978-94-024-0899-7. ISBN 978-94-024-0897-3. ISSN 1877-9077. S2CID 132651566.
- Backwell, L.R.; d'Errico, F. (2014). "Palaeolithic bone tools". In C. Smith (ed.). Encyclopedia of Global Archaeology. Vol. 2. New York: Springer Reference. ISBN 978-1-4419-0465-2. OCLC 870899596.
- Caruana, M.; d'Errico, F.; Backwell, L.R. (2013). "Early hominin social learning strategies underlying the use and production of bone and stone tools.". In C. Sanz; C. Boesch; J. Call (eds.). Tool Use in Animals: Cognition and Ecology. Cambridge University Press. pp. 242–285.
- d'Errico, F.; Backwell, L.R. (2007). "From Swartkrans to Arcy-sur-Cure. The use of bone tools in the Lower and Middle Palaeolithic.". In E. Baquedano (ed.). El Universo Neanderthal. Fundacion Duques de Soria [The Neanderthal Universe. Foundation Dukes de Soria]. Madrid, Spain: Ibersaf. pp. 101–143. ISBN 978-84-95803-56-6. OCLC 433357391.

=== Research reports ===
- Backwell, L.R. 2008. Report on 2005 – 2007 excavations at Wonderkrater, a late Quaternary spring and peat mound site in Limpopo Province, South Africa. Submitted to South African Heritage Resources Agency (SAHRA).
- Backwell, L.R. 2008. Report on 2005 – 2007 excavations at Heelbo I, a large mammal mass death assemblage in Free State Province, South Africa. Submitted to South African Heritage Resources Agency (SAHRA).

== Thesis and dissertation ==
Backwell, L.R. 2004. Early Hominid Bone Tool Industries. PhD submitted by publications. University of the Witwatersrand and University of Bordeaux I.

Backwell, L.R. 2000. A Critical Assessment of Southern African "Early Hominid Bone Tools". Unpublished MSc. University of the Witwatersrand.

== Documentaries ==
- 2022, San elders speak: Ancestral knowledge of the Kalahari San video archive.
- 2014, YouTube documentary, the San ostrich trap.
- 2013, A Shaman's Journey. The last elders [Le voyage de Kgonta Bo, le chaman]. Documentary film produced by MC4, with the participation of France Télévisions and Planète Thalassa for France 5 Television.
- 2012, San material culture, PNAS.
- 2008, Department of Science and Technology. Progress of Science, Human Origins Education (SABC 1)
- 2004, National Geographic Society
- 2003, African Solutions on SABC 3.
- 2002, Cradle of Humankind World Heritage Site (Discovery Channel, Canada)

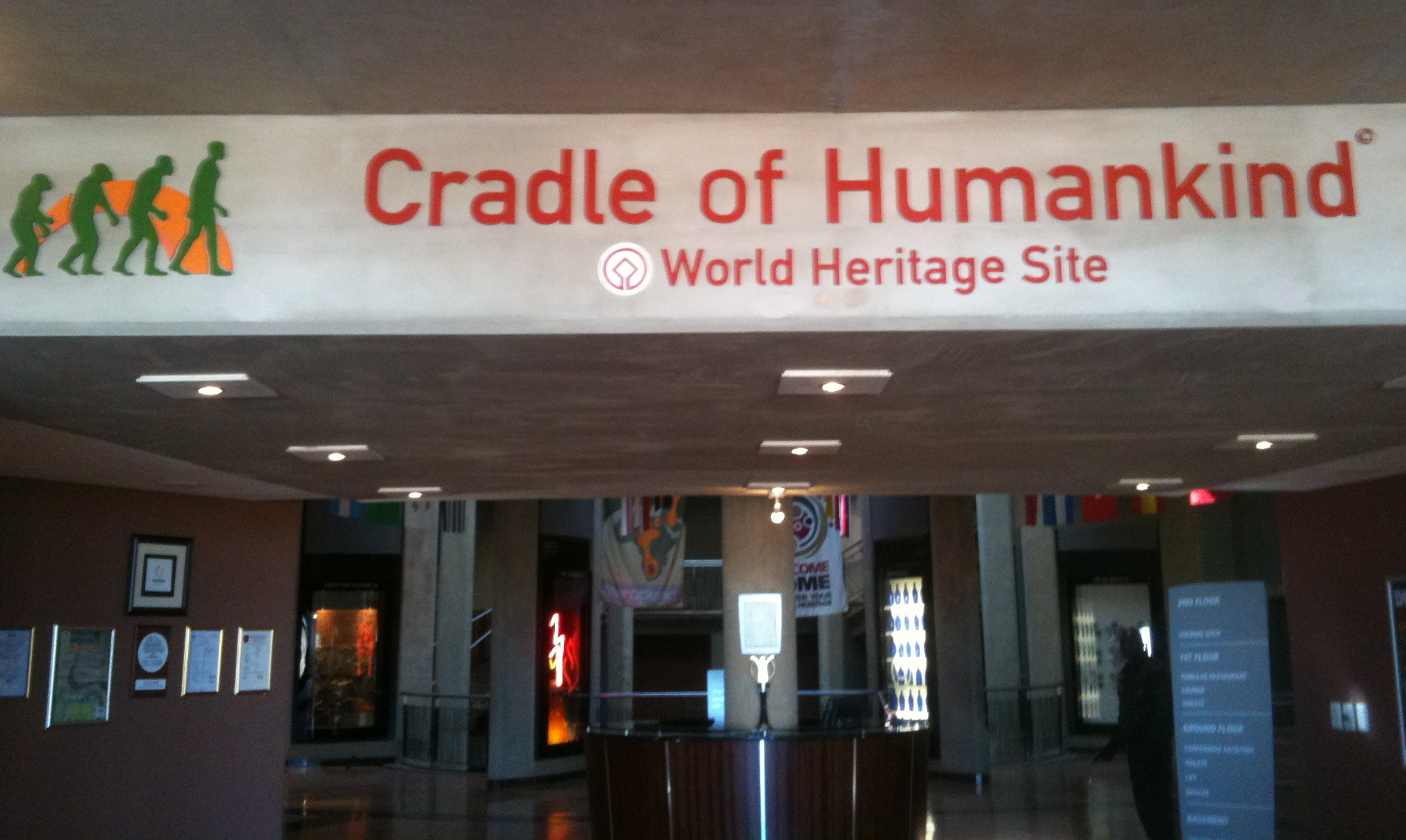
Cradle of humankind exhibit

- 2001, Discovery Channel (Canada)
- 2001, Technologic (Summit TV, DStv Ch 412)
- 2001, Cradle of Humankind World Heritage Site
- 2001, Odyssey of Mankind (Zweites Deutsches Fernsehen)

== Awards/recognition ==
- "Best 1st year Lecturer" by Wits University School of Geosciences Geological Student Society. (2014)
- Journal of Archaeological Science Top cited article 2007–2011. (2012)
- NRF rating: C1 (valid 2012 – 2017). (2011)
- Promoted to senior researcher. (2011)
- Voted "Best Lecturer for 1st year", by Wits University School of Geosciences Geological Student Society. (2010)
- Voted "Coolest Lectures for 1st year", by Wits University School of Geosciences Geological Student Society. (2010)
- Voted "Best 1st year Lecturer", by Wits University School of Geosciences Geological Student Society. (2009)
- FEI Prize (Life Sciences) for the best paper on electron microscopy published in an international journal. *"Probable human hair found in a fossil hyaena coprolite from Gladysvale cave, South Africa." (2009)
- Science Direct, 6th most downloaded paper in first quarter for Journal of Archaeological Science. (2009)
- Top 100 Science Stories, Discover Magazine. (2008)
- Certificate of Appreciation, Life Sciences Educators, Teaching and Learning Services, Department of Education, KwaZulu-Natal, South Africa (2008)
- First South African woman to be awarded a PhD in palaeoanthropology at a local institution. (2004)
- University Postgraduate Local Merit Scholarship. (2003)
- University Council Postgraduate Scholarship. (2002)
- University Postgraduate Merit Award. (2002)
- S2A3 Medal. Presented by the South African Association for the Advancement of Science: Most distinguished master's degree in the Faculty of Science for 2000. (2001)
- Top 100 Science Stories Discover magazine: "Evidence of termite foraging by Swartkrans early hominids". Proceedings of the National Academy of Sciences. (2001)
- University Council Postgraduate Scholarship. (2001)
- Postgraduate Merit Award. (2001)
- MSc. in Palaeoanthropology (cum laude), University of the Witwatersrand Medical School. (2000)
- Postgraduate Local Merit Scholarship. (2000)
- University Postgraduate Merit Award. (2000)
- Category A Award for 2000. (200)
- Lystrosaurus Shield: Best student paper presented at the 11th Biennial Conference of the Palaeontological Society of Southern Africa.
