= Diepkloof Rock Shelter =

Rock shelter in Western Cape, South Africa

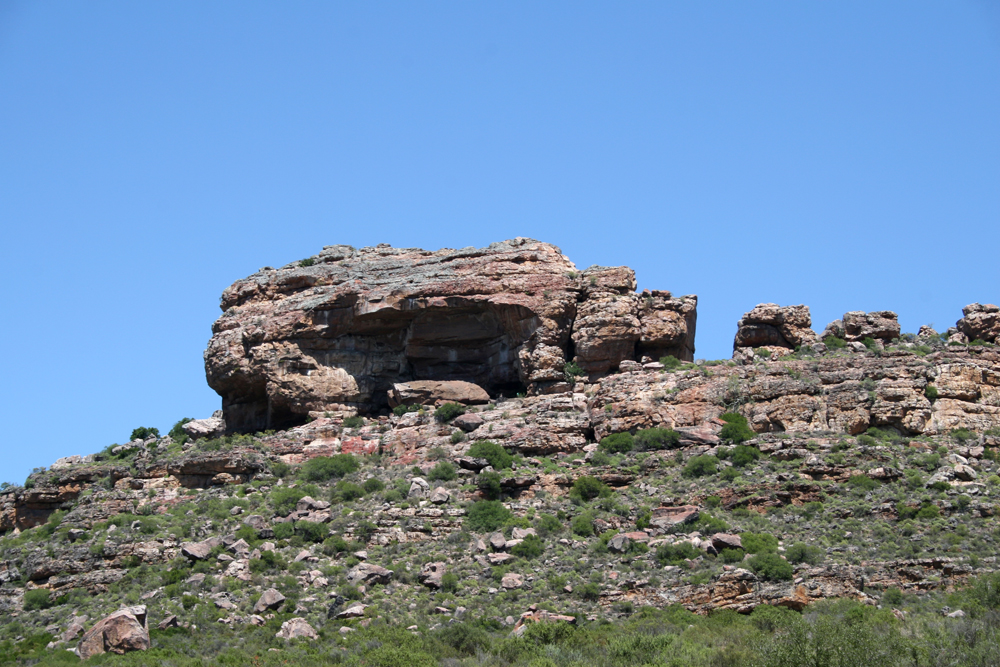
- General view of Diepkloof Rock Shelter

- Location within Western Cape
- Location: Verlorenvlei, Western Cape
- Coordinates: 32°23′12″S 18°27′10″E
- Geology: Quartzitic Sandstone

UNESCO World Heritage Site
- Official name: Diepkloof Rock Shelter
- Part of: The Emergence of Modern Human Behaviour: The Pleistocene Occupation Sites of South Africa
- Criteria: Cultural: iii, iv, v
- Inscription: 2024 (46th Session)

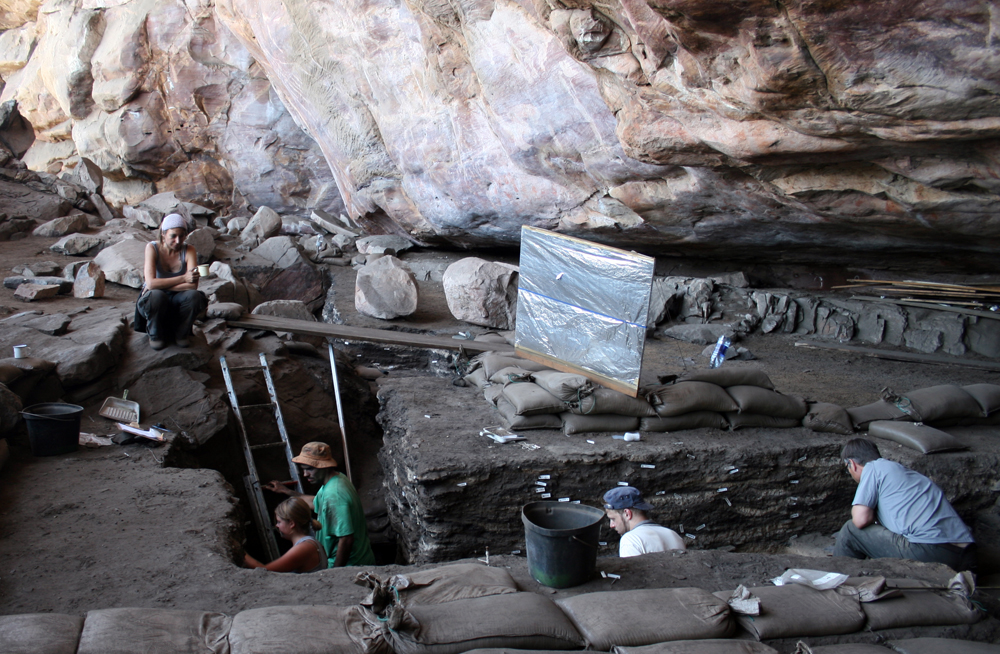
General view of the excavation during 2009 field season

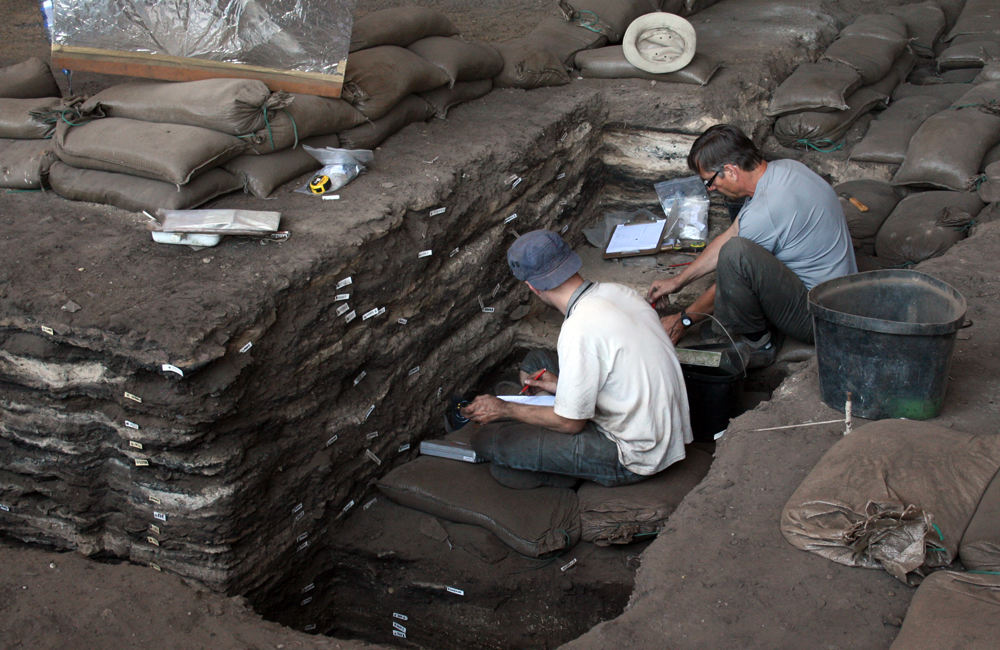
Excavation of the upper part of the deposit

Diepkloof Rock Shelter is a rock shelter in Western Cape, South Africa in which has been found some of the earliest evidence of the human use of symbols, in the form of patterns engraved upon ostrich eggshell water containers. These date around 60,000 years ago.

The symbolic patterns consist of lines crossed at right angles or oblique angles by hatching. It has been suggested that "by the repetition of this motif, early humans were trying to communicate something. Perhaps they were trying to express the identity of the individual or the group."

In 2024, the Diepkloof Rock Shelter became a part of the World Heritage Site of Pleistocene Occupation Sites of South Africa.

== Site description ==
The cave is about 17 kilometres (11 mi) from the shoreline of the Atlantic Ocean in a semi-arid area, near Elands Bay about 150 kilometres (93 mi) north of Cape Town. It occurs in quartzitic sandstone in a butte that overlooks in an east direction 100 metres (330 ft) above the Verlorenvlei River. It contains one of the "most complete and continuous later Middle Stone Age sequences in southern Africa" stretching from before 130,000 BP to about 45,000 BP and encompassing pre-Stillbay, Stillbay, Howiesons Poort, and post-Howiesons Poort periods. It is about 25 metres (82 ft) wide and 15 metres (49 ft) deep. Research is based upon finds discovered in a trench excavated within it that is 16 metres (52 ft) across and 3.6 metres (12 ft) in depth. The deposits consist of burnt and nonburnt organic residues and ash that came from hearths, ash dumps and burnt bedding.

It was first excavated in 1973 by John Parkington and Cedric Poggenpoel. Since 1999 it has been researched in a collaboration between the Department of Archaeology at the University of Cape Town and the Institute of Prehistory and Quaternary Geology at the University of Bordeaux.

At Diepkloof Rock Shelter (DRS), from 70 to 74 ka bifaces and bifacial points are present while less complex forms such as backed artifacts occur from 70 ka through 60 ka and are subsequently replaced with unifacial points. Quartz and quartzite predominate the earliest unit with few occurrences of silcrete. During 70-74 ka unit, silcrete has replaced quartz while quartzite is still fairly dominant. From 65 to 70 ka quartz becomes dominant again with quartzite also being present.

== Engraved ostrich eggshell containers ==
Some 270 fragments of ostrich eggshell containers have been found covered with engraved geometric patterns. The fragments have a maximum size of 20–30 mm, though a number have been fitted into larger 80 × 40 mm fragments. It is estimated that fragments from 25 containers have been found. Eggshell fragments have been found throughout the period of occupation of the cave but those with engraving are found only in several layers within the Howiesons Poort period. These occur across 18 stratigraphic units, particularly those with the stratigraphic names Frank and Darryl. This suggests the tradition of engraving lasted for several thousand years.

The engraving consists of abstract linear repetitive patterns, including a hatched band motif. One fragment has two parallel lines that might have been circular around the container.

It has been suggested that they form "a system of symbolic representation in which collective identities and individual expressions are clearly communicated, suggesting social, cultural, and cognitive underpinnings that overlap with those of modern people." Moreover, they show "the development of a graphic tradition and the complex use of symbols to mediate social interactions. The large number of marked pieces shows that there were rules for composing designs but having room within the rules to allow for individual and/or group preferences."

Earlier finds exist of symbolism, such as the 75,000-year-old engraved ochre chunks found in the Blombos cave, but these are isolated and difficult to tell apart from meaningless doodles.

The engravings are found on ostrich eggshells that were used as water containers. Ostrich eggshells have an average volume of 1 litre. They may have had drinking spouts, holes to enable them to be strung as a canteen for easier carrying, and seem to have been part of "daily hunter-gatherer life". They involved skill to make, with one of the researchers involved noting "Ostrich egg shells are quite hard. Doing such engravings is not so easy."

== Local flora ==
The preservation of organic matter such as wood, grass, seeds and fruits at the site has been described as "exceptional". Pollen remains allow the identification of the local animals and plants. The Howiesons Poort period shows evidence for thicket or shrubland vegetation now usually found in gorges, such as Diospyros, Cassine peragua, Maytenus, Rhus, and Hartogiella schinoides. Afromontane trees found in the area, include Ficus, Kiggelaria africana, Podocarpus elongatus, and Celtis africana. This suggests a more diversely wooded riverine environment than now present in the area.

== Animal remains ==
Animal remains include those of mammals, tortoises and intertidal marine shells. Most bones found in the cave come from rock hyrax, hares, cape dune mole-rats, steenbok and grysbok. Animals from rocky environments are also found including klipspringer, and vaalribbok. There is also evidence of local grasslands, with remains of zebras, wildebeest and hartebeest. Hippopotamus and southern reedbuck came from the local river. The sea coast seems to have moved up the river, as there are fragments from black mussels, granite limpets, and Cape fur seals. Although there are ostrich-shell remains, no ostrich bones have been found.

Tortoise bones are mostly those of the angulate tortoise that is still found in the area. These are noted to have been "remarkably large compared with their Late Stone Age counterparts, suggesting different intensities of predation between MSA and Late Stone Age populations".

== Provincial heritage site ==
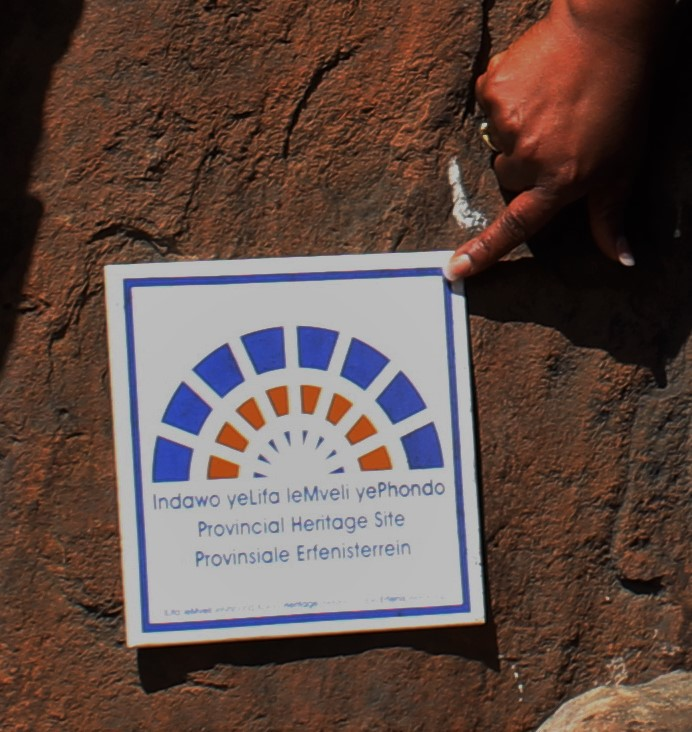
Badge indicating that the Diepkloof Rock Shelter is a provincial heritage site

Diepkloof Rock Shelter was declared a provincial heritage site by Heritage Western Cape on 23 September 2014 in terms of Section 27 of the National Heritage Resources Act. This gives the site Grade II status and provides it with protection under South African heritage law.

In 2015, the South African government submitted a proposal to add the caves to the list of World Heritage Sites and it has been placed on the UNESCO list of tentative sites as a potential future 'serial nomination' together with Blombos Cave, Pinnacle Point, Klasies River Caves, Sibudu Cave and Border Cave. Three of the sites gained the World Heritage Status in 2024.
