= Te Matuku Bay =

Te Matuku Bay Te Matuku
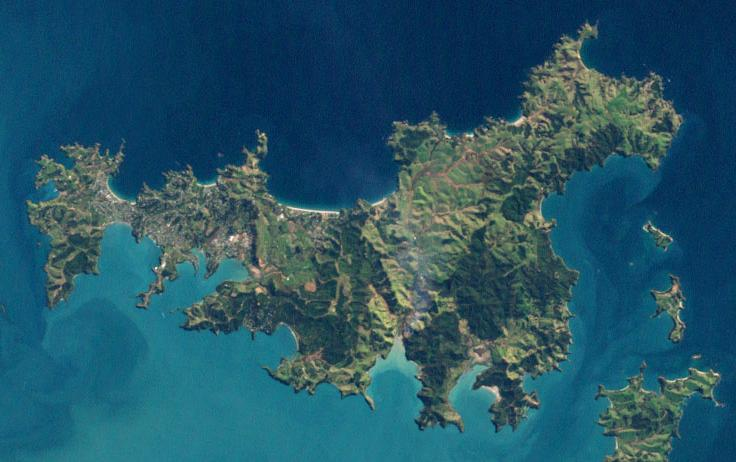
- Interactive map of Te Matuku Bay
- Coordinates: 36.822708°S 175.1347094°E
- Country: New Zealand
- Region: Auckland
- Local board area: Waiheke Island

Te Matuku Bay is a bay on Waiheke Island in New Zealand's Hauraki Gulf. It is one of the largest and least disturbed estuaries on the island. Since 2003, the area has been protected as part of Te Matuku Marine Reserve.

The bay and marine reserve are named after the now-rare matuku or Australasian bittern.

Te Matuku has public toilets but no shops. The area has opportunities for swimming, diving, boating, kayaking, snorkelling and walking where weather conditions permit.

== Geography ==
Te Matuku Bay consists of sand, mudflats, mangroves and saltmarsh that are submerged at high tide, but almost completely dry at low tide.

There are several smaller bays at entrance to the bay with rocky shores and gravel beaches: Whites Bay, Little Bay, Sandy Bay and Otakawhe Bay.

On the eastern side of the bay are small shell spits, where native and migrating shorebirds roost and nest.

The forest vegetation on the hillslopes surrounding the bay includes a mix of mature and regenerating coastal broadleaved forest; kauri, podocarp and broadleaved forest; and kānuka forest and scrub.

== History ==
=== Pre-European history ===
Before European arrival, Te Matuku Bay was an important food-gathering area. The thick shell middens in the bay are evidence of how bountiful seafood was in the area at the time.

The bay was also an important waka landing place for Māori living in coastal settlements, or at the pā at Maunganui, the highest point on Waiheke Island. Ngāti Paoa were the primary inhabitants and guardians of Waiheke Island, but other iwi like Hauraki and Ngāi Tai have ancestral ties of the area, making it historically, culturally and spiritually important.

=== European settlement ===
Te Matuku Bay was also the location of the first European settlement on Waiheke Island.

The township was later disestablished, but the site of the first school and the pioneer cemetery still remain.

=== Marine reserve ===
Te Matuku Marine Reserve was established by a law change in 2003. Under the law change, fishing, taking or killing marine life, or moving or removing any marine life and materials. However, an offshore oyster farm was allowed to continue operating at its existing scale and extent.

== See also ==
- Te Matuku Marine Reserve
- Marine reserves of New Zealand
