= Rose Cottage Cave =

Archaeological site in South Africa

- Rose Cottage Cave
- 29°12′26″S 27°27′17″E
- Location: South Africa

Rose Cottage Cave (RCC) is an archaeological site in the Free State, South Africa, situated only a few kilometers away from Ladybrand, close to the Caledon River, on the northern slopes of the Platberg. RCC is an important site because of its long cultural sequence, its roots in modern human behavior, and the movement of early modern humans out of Africa. Rose Cottage is the only site from the Middle Stone Age that can tell us about the behavioral variability of hunter-gatherers during the Late Pleistocene and Holocene. Berry D. Malan excavated the site between 1943 and 1946, shortly followed by Peter B. Beaumont in the early 1960s, and the most recent excavations occurred from 1987 to 1997 by Lyn Wadley and Philip Harper in 1989 under Wadley's supervision. Humans have inhabited Rose Cottage for over 100,000 years throughout the Middle and Later Stone Ages. Site formation and sediment formation processes at Rose Cottage appear to be primarily anthropogenic. Archaeological research focuses primarily on blade technology and tool forms from the Middle Stone Age and the implications of modern human behavior. Structurally, the cave measures more than 6 meters (20 feet) deep and about 20 by 10 meters (66 by 33 ft). A boulder encloses the front, protecting the cave, but allowing a small opening for a skylight and narrow entrances on both the east and west sides.

== Archaeological excavations ==
The extensive excavation sequence at Rose Cottage dates to Berry Malan in the 1940s. Shortly after, Peter Beaumont excavated the cave in 1962. Both Malan and Beaumont yielded LSA and MSA materials. The most recent explorations, from 1987 to 1997, were led by Lyn Wadley. In 1989, Philip Harper also contributed to excavations involving extensive analyses of lithic assemblages under Wadley's supervision.

=== Malan ===
In the 1940s, Malan began excavations at Rose Cottage Cave. He explored a vast extent of the cave and excavated in 3-inch (76 mm) spits. Depending on the order and relative position of strata and the homogeneity of the natural sediment, some spits measured to depths of 6 to 9 inches (150 to 230 mm). Unfortunately, the spits distorted cultural sequence boundaries and thus complicated the correlation between collections and various excavations. Malan excavated a sizable expanse of the upper levels of the site, but only five squares (measured in yards) deep into the MSA layers.

During his excavations, Malan collected MSA ochre from Rose Cottage, but only kept pieces he thought significant. Malan never analyzed his artifacts, but Wadley and Harper conducted a study of the recovered lithics more than 40 years later and observed intermittent occurrences of lithic chunks and chips. These erratic frequencies may have occurred because Malan did not methodically store all artifacts. The frequent appearance of ochre pieces in Malan's collection, specifically small fragments with no discernible evidence of use detrition, is also likely the effect of his irregular collection practices. Malans' ochre collection included 84 definite and 25 potential pieces of ochre. The oldest layers contained the highest percentage of ochre pieces, while the post-Howiesons Poort layers contained the lowest ratio. A detailed examination of scored ochre collected from the oldest MSA layers suggests unpractical scoring, but instead possible engravings.

Despite the importance of the cave, Malan ceased his excavations in 1946 and performed no further explorations of the site or the collected materials. In 1952, Malan released a publication consisting of preliminary observations. He interpreted the extensive Stone Age sequence as Wilton, Pre-Wilton, MSA, and a three-phase Howiesons Poort.

=== Beaumont ===
In 1962, Beaumont re-excavated Rose Cottage Cave to collect samples of charcoal for radiocarbon dating, a method not yet developed during Malan's excavations. The collected charcoal samples confirmed the antiquity of the cave and provided several dates from the LSA and MSA layers. The upper layers contained ceramics dating to 1100 BP (+/- 30). Beaumont presented an additional industrial period, the Early Later Stone Age (ELSA) industry, ranging between 29,000 BP and 40,000 BP. The ELSA correlates to strata between 1 and 3 meters deep. However, it is almost impossible to compare layers of the cave based solely on depth due to the sloping of the cave deposits. Beaumont never published his excavation results.

=== Wadley ===
Lyn Wadley spent eleven years conducting large-scale excavations at Rose Cottage Cave. Wadley excavated a sizable extent of the site but dismissed her digs in the upper MSA layers to focus on LSA occupation and carry out spatial analysis. The first steps of her excavation process included clearing out and sandbagging the old sections of the collapsing cave walls. She then constructed a 20-quadrant grid and excavated to depths of about 0.5 metres (20 inches) in the undamaged parts of the cave. Wadley, with the assistance of Harper, executed extensive analyses of lithic assemblages. The accumulations substantially include fine-grained opalines, which were likely washed down by mountain streams from the Drakensberg basalts into the Caledon River, located approximately 10 kilometers from the site.

Wadley also collected charcoal samples intended for environmental analysis. The collected charcoal samples resulted in two unique vegetation patterns: one that corresponds to the Holocene and one to the Late Pleistocene.

== Site formation ==
Sediment peels from Rose Cottage Cave preserve unique materials and provide a record for site formation processes. A detailed examination of the sediment peels, coupled with Fourier transform infrared spectroscopy, demonstrates an abundance of sand- and silt-sized quartz grains. A small gap in the cave likely allowed for the entrance of these quartz grains. In parts of the cave, sediments measure more than 6 meters (20 feet) deep. These deposits were formed chiefly from the weathering of the sandstone walls and roof of the cave and materials washed in by rainfall.

Deposits of burnt bone, charcoal, lithic fragments, fat-derived char, and ashes indicate that Rose Cottage has rich anthropogenic contributions to the formation of the site. Slow, continuous downslope creep has produced an accumulation of loose, unconsolidated sediment deposits at the base of the cave. The buildup of these remains, combined with animal and plant disturbances, has homogenized much of the sediment deposits. Evidence of well-preserved bedding and sedimentary structures containing physical remains of fire is rare but is occasionally present in the sediment peels.

Clay-coated artifacts indicate the downward flow of water over the sequence, which is probable reasoning for the poor preservation of bone and ashes at Rose Cottage Cave. Sand and silt laminae and accumulations of coarse residual material left in the channel by the normal processes of the stream are observable in sediment peels dating from between 60 and 35 ka BP. These remains suggest an environment with high-energy sediment and frequent flooding, causing underlying deposits to erode and depositing newer sediment in large volumes. This environment explains the fluctuating presence of artifacts in the post-Howiesons Poort layers and implies human activity at Rose Cottage Cave during this period.

== Technological innovations ==
The Middle Stone Age dates to ages between around 96,000 and 30,000 years ago. Optically stimulated luminescence (OSL) for sediments and thermoluminescence (TL) for burned artifacts were used to derive these MSA ages. These ages denote approximately 60,000 years of MSA occupations at Rose Cottage Cave. During this period, blade technology and tool forms appeared at Rose Cottage Cave, suggesting episodes of ingenuity and innovation. The MSA tool assemblages include the recognizable Howiesons Poort industry (within which progressive variation is observable) and earlier and later MSA groupings. The Howiesons Poort layers are discernible by the occurrence of various backed tools (crescents and lunate segments), obliquely backed blades (truncations), backed blades, thin blades, and bladelets.

=== Howiesons Poort industry ===
The Howiesons Poort pieces are a variety of small geometric blades used as inserts in composite weapons. Composite tools signify a unique model in tool production and imply a progressive cognitive state. These multi-component tools were held together with complex pastes prepared from red ochre combined with plant gum. The term ochre describes a group of rocks that are usually carbonates of iron and have partially or wholly replaced limestone. Rose Cottage Cave Howiesons Poort encompasses an evolving classification of three phases: the pre-Howiesons Poort (pre-HP) phase, the Howiesons Poort (HP) phase, and the post-Howiesons Poort (post-HP) phase. These phases exhibit considerable changes in the length, shape, and thickness of the tools throughout time. Further analysis of these phases revealed a consistent trend toward smaller flake blades and flakes. However, the pieces all exhibit the central characteristics of a "classic" Howiesons Poort. The Howiesons Poort technology is evidence of developed hunting technologies with possible social and symbolic connotations.

=== Ochre evidence ===
No sources of ochre occur in or around Rose Cottage Cave, yet the site has an extensive record of ochre collection and use. Excavations at Rose Cottage provide evidence of ochre use for over sixty thousand years. Pieces of ochre were first collected from the cave by Malan, later followed by Harper. Ochre pieces differ in color, grain size, geological type, and hardness. Red is associated with hematite rich ochre and yellow with goethite. Much of the excavated ochre had silty or clayey grain sizes.

The post-Howiesons Poort layers proved to be the most abundant in ochre pieces, but the Howiesons Poort layers had the highest ochre frequency per sediment volume. The utilization rate of ochre was highest in the pre-Howiesons Poort layers. The properties of the ochre pieces excavated from Rose Cottage Cave from the Middle Stone Age (MSA) indicate evidence of surface modifications. This evidence suggests that these early artisans did not simply color their pastes red but instead intentionally affected their physical appearance through chemical changes.

=== Ochre use ===
The use of the term ochre" instead of coloring material or pigment prevents assumptions of ochre use. New analyses of ochre groupings from Rose Cottage Cave improve our understanding of ochre use throughout the MSA. Archaeological evidence and finds of orche demonstrate use to a certain degree. People at Rose Cottage Cave used ochre for rubbing, grinding, and instances of scoring. The rubbing technique directly transfers red powder from ochre onto surfaces like animal hide and human skin. Rubbing is appropriate for purposes such as coloring, marking, or protecting skin or hide (from bacteria, insects, or the sun). Evidence suggests that early artisans purposely colored and wore suspended ochre and ochre in pierced shells. The grinding of ochre produces a red ochre powder that, when combined with water, is useful for several tasks such as cosmetics, ochre-based paint, or ochre-loaded adhesives. The kinds of ochre selected are contingent upon the time restrictions of some of the processes and techniques and the implied uses of ochre. Engraved ochre found in burials implies a potential symbolic connotation.

== Cultural innovations ==
Excavations at Rose Cottage Cave suggest evidence of cultural modernity, such as the storage of symbolic materials. Dark-grey, fine-grained deposits, proving rich in organics, are believed to be composed of decaying plant and animal materials likely discarded by occupants. Sediments from Late Pleistocene and Holocene layers show that deposits collected from inside the RCC are extremely C3 compared with deposits from outside, which are exceptionally C4. The C3 sediments from inside the cave must incorporate materials brought into Rose Cottage by its inhabitants, such as edible plants, leaves for bedding, and firewood.

== Environment ==
The environment of Rose Cottage Cave is primarily a sub-humid, summer precipitation area with occasional winter rainfall. Rose Cottage lies within the Caledon River corridor (measuring about 50 kilometers (31 miles) wide), which, in comparison with the surrounding areas, experiences moderately severe winter frost. The cave is positioned facing northward; consequently, it is warmed by the sun during the winter months and cool in the summer. The surrounding vegetation is mainly Cymbopogon-Themeda grassland. This veld is fecund after rain showers; however, the grazing period is only six months out of the year. The open rural plains of the cave are mainly drab grasslands strewn with patches of scrub thicket, bush, and rocky sandstone hill slopes.
