= Howiesons Poort =

Cultural period of the Middle Stone Age in Africa

Howiesons Poort (also called HP) is a technological and cultural period characterized by material evidence with shared design features found in South Africa, Lesotho, and Namibia. It was named after the Howieson's Poort Shelter archaeological site near Grahamstown in South Africa, where the first assemblage of these tools was discovered. Howiesons Poort is believed, based on chronological comparisons between many sites, to have started around 64.8 thousand years ago and ended around 59.5 thousand years ago. It is considered to be a technocomplex, or a cultural period in archaeology classified by distinct and specific technological materials. Howiesons Poort is notable for its relatively complex tools, technological innovations, and cultural objects evidencing symbolic expression. One site in particular, Sibudu Cave, provides one of the key reference sequences for Howiesons Poort. Howiesons Poort assemblages are primarily found at sites south of the Limpopo River.

While the emergence of this techno-complex is still highly debated, one leading hypothesis postulates that it emerged during a period of harsh environmental conditions and unpredictable landscapes, which may have spurred inhabitants to develop more complex tools and social structures as an adaptive response. Humans of this period as in the earlier Stillbay period showed signs of having practiced symbolic behaviors and having engaged in between-group exchanges of backed tools for the proposed function of solidifying bonds and strengthening social networks.

Many of the tools associated with Howiesons Poort resemble and seemingly anticipate many tool styles that do not appear again until far later in the archaeological record. The succeeding period, the "post-Howiesons Poort", lacks many of the complex technologies that characterize Howiesons Poort. While there is no universally agreed-upon explanation as to why this happened, there are several leading proposed theories, some of which involve shifts in resource availability and foraging strategies.

== Discovery ==
Artifacts associated with Howiesons Poort were first described in 1927 by Reverend P. Stapleton, a Jesuit schoolteacher at St Aidan's College, and John Hewitt, a zoologist and director of the local Albany museum. The two were excavating a rock shelter in the eastern Cape (later named the Howiesons Poort Rock Shelter) when they discovered an assemblage consisting of "burins, large segments, obliquely pointed blades, and trimmed points." Stapleton and Hewitt had meant to name the poort after a Mr. Howison, but they misspelled it "Howieson" in their publication. This name stuck and has been used with this spelling ever since.

Due to its affinities to Later Stone Age microliths and Upper Paleolithic tools, Howiesons Poort was originally proposed to be a variety of Magosian tools produced during a transition between the Middle Stone Age and the Later Stone Age. This transitional theory, however, was discredited during an excavation of Klasies River Caves undertaken by Ronald Singer and John J. Wymer in 1967-8. During the excavation, they uncovered key reference stratigraphic layers which showed that Howiesons Poort materials were situated both before and after Middle Stone Age layers. This finding not only contradicts the notion of Howiesons Poort as a transitional technocomplex, but pushes back the dates for these so-called "advanced" technologies.

== Paleoenvironment ==
Sites that contain Howiesons Poort assemblages are spread geographically throughout southern Africa, encompassing a variety of environments that include coastal, near-coastal, inland and mountainous. Based on an analysis of faunal remains at Klipdrift Shelter, Jerome P. Reynard et al. (2016) have proposed an environmental shift during the period, from a mixed-terrain context during early Howiesons Poort to open grasslands in mid-to-later Howiesons Poort. Upon an analysis of the frequency of faunal remains, the team found increased levels of human occupation during the period of open grasslands.

Southern African regional marine and terrestrial data indicate that Marine Isotope Stage 4, which encapsulates the known dates for Howiesons Poort, was a period of cool and moist climates. Macrofaunal data from Sibudu Cave indicate that inhabitants of the cave were hunting animals that occupied closed or semi closed environments, pointing to an access to forests. There is, however, small but significant frequencies of the faunal remains of grazers, which indicates that the inhabitants of the cave also had some access to grasslands. Therefore, there is evidence that the changing of the climate into moister conditions resulted in the development of more extensive forests, at least in the near-coastal region which includes Sibudu Cave, without completely eliminating more open savannah woodlands.

== Date ==
The date range for Howiesons Poort has been debated. During their 1965 excavation of the name site, archaeologists Janette Deacon and Hilary Deacon dated charcoal remains using radiocarbon dating to 19,000-4,000 years ago. However, this does not match the dates ascertained for Howiesons Poort materials at other sites, which were dated to much older time ranges. While relative dating using the stratigraphic layers at this site appeared simple to the archaeologists at first, J. Deacon noted that the range of dates contradicted those at other sites where other Howiesons Poort assemblages had been found. Deacon concluded that all Howiesons Poort materials date to beyond the range of radiocarbon dating, meaning that they are all at least 50,000 years old.

This is consistent with later dates obtained at sites along the coastline of South Africa, near-coastal areas, as well as sites at Lesotho and Namibia, which came to light with the advent of optically stimulated luminescence, which dates the Howiesons Poort layers to between 64.8 and 59.5 thousand years ago. This date matches the oxygen isotope stageOIS4, which was a period of aridity and lowering of sea levels in southern Africa. This study also points out that these dates indicate that Howiesons Poort only lasted for around 5,000 years and occurred during a genetic bottleneck that took place in Africa 60,000-80,000 years ago which was accompanied by an expansion of modern human populations out of the continent.

These dates, which were obtained by a group led by researcher Zenobia Jacobs, have been contested by contrasting dates reported by researcher Chantal Tribolo. While Jacobs used OSL (optically stimulated luminescence), which dates the last time sediment was exposed to light before being buried, Tribolo used thermoluminescence, which dates the last time a material was subjected to extreme heat. This method of dating pushes back the proposed ages of Howiesons Poort to 55 to 80 thousand years ago, which would make it significantly older than previously believed. In response, Jacobs and Richard G. Roberts reran their methods and reported new ages with smaller error margins. The ages they reported in this study were consistent with their old ones, and did not match Tribolo and colleagues' 2008 reported ages.

== Technology ==
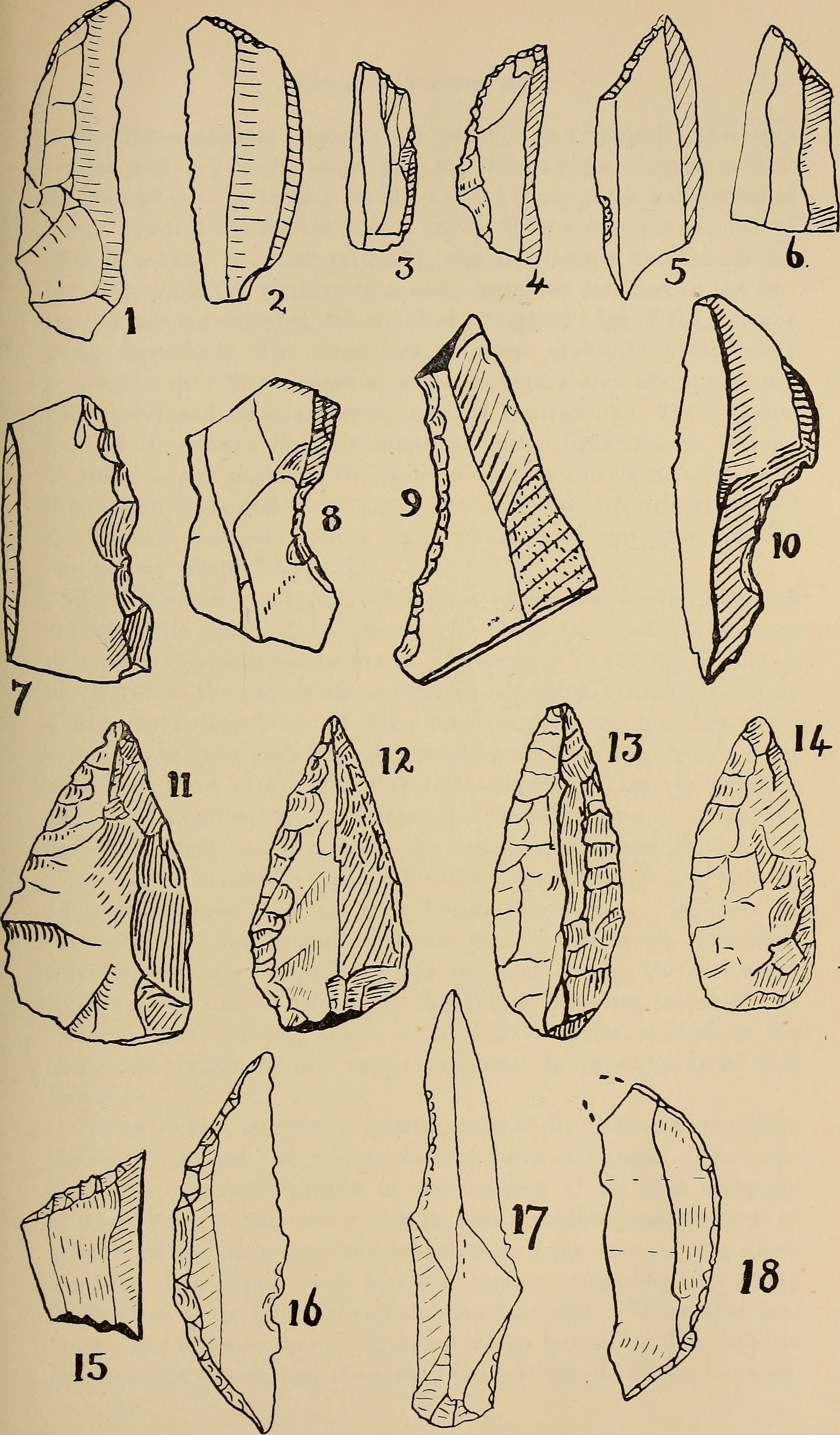
Diagram of characteristic Howiesons Poort implements. Typologies are as follows: 1-6, blades, etc.; 7-10, concave scrapers; 11-14, lance-heads; 15, trapezoid; 16 and 18, crescents; 17, blade.

=== Typology ===
Many Howiesons Poort assemblages, such as the ones found at Klasies River, are characterized by backed tool. Backed tools have had an edge intentionally blunted by the removal of many small flakes. There is also evidence of the recurring practice of shortening blades into a trapeze-like shape. There are several possible benefits of backing pieces, including facilitating hand grip as well as hafting. A 2022 experimental study run by a group led by researcher Justin Pargeter, however, found that backed stone tools were less successfully stuck to wooden shafts than were non-backed tools. This contradicts the hypothesis that tools were backed for hafting and suggests alternative reasons, such as potential symbolic functions.

There are relatively high levels of between-site variability in term of tool typology frequencies, even for sites that are geographically close to one another. While the sites of Border Cave, Klasies River, and Nelson Bay Cave have many segments and trapezes, Rose Cottage Cave stands out as having very few. Rose Cottage assemblages appear to be dominated by the presence of backed blades, which are also common at the other three sites but to a lesser extent. Neither Rose Cottage Cave, Sibudu Cave, or Klasies River Cave have very many points or scrapers, which are common at sites such as Montagu Cave and Umhlatuzana.

=== Hafted Tools ===
Micro-residue analysis on Howiesons Poort stone tools, such as those from KwaZulu-Natal sites, show evidence of the use of ochre as an organic adhesive for hafting. In the past, ochre has been considered as evidence for early human displays of symbolic behavior, and ochre has been found extensively at many sites associated with Howiesons Poort, such as Apollo 11, Boomplaas, Border Cave, Sibudu, and others. This micro-residue analysis, however, indicates that ochre was used not only for symbolic purposes, but also as a functional device for complex tool manufacturing. Replication experiments have shown that ochre is a useful loading agent for adhesion; however, there are other alternative ingredients that people during the Middle Stone Age likely knew about and could have been using instead.

=== Raw Materials ===
Howiesons Poort assemblages show increased use of quartz and other fine-grained materials. At Klasies River, locally source quartize was primarily used through most of the Middle Stone Age. Within the Howiesons Poort layers, however, there is considerably more raw material diversity through the additions of quartz, silcrete, hornfels and chalcedony. As the closest silcrete outcrop to Klasies River is more than 20 kilometers away, there is evidence of non-local raw material sourcing and transport. An analysis of the cores found at this site show that the non-quartzite cores appear to be smaller and thinner, implying a higher degree of reduction for non-quartzite than for quartzite.

For most sites, there is a clear preference of Howiesons Poort knappers for using fine-grained materials, such as quartz and silcrete, to produce the small blades and backed tools that are seen in the assemblages. This had led researchers to propose that Howiesons Poort was accompanied by a time of increased mobility. However, the primary raw material found in assemblages at Umhlatuzana is locally available vein quartz, and most backed tools at Sibudu Cave are made from local raw materials such as hornfels and dolerite, while only a few are made from quartz.

=== Bone and Antler ===
The discovery of bone points within Howiesons Poort layers at Sibudu Cave in South Africa has expanded the confirmed tool types for the technocomplex and has expanded the variety of technological innovations associated with the Middle Stone Age. The points, and a spatula-shaped polished piece of bone, were found to be older than ~61,000 years. Experimental studies have shown that the polished piece has similar use-wear marks to bones used to work animal hides.

== Foraging and Diets ==
The tools that characterize Howiesons Poort are highly specialized and reliable, which has led researchers to propose that the technocomplex came about during a time of planned and strategic foraging of predictable, known, and localized resources. Foragers likely targeted resources through knowledge of seasonal ecological changes. This is also indicative of hunting trips of further distances designed to target clumps of resources in a specialized way. This strategy was probably accompanied with more complex social structures and more frequent instances of information sharing about the environment, which mitigates risk while foraging and is also evidenced by the discoveries of symbolic objects seen with Howiesons Poort assemblages. Groups participated in the exchange of hunting tools, which helped maintain social networks and information sharing amidst a difficult climate.

Faunal analysis of the Howiesons Poort layers at Sibudu Cave show a high frequency of small animals as well as animals that prefer forested environments (such as blue duikers and bushpigs), while the post-Howiesons Poort layers show a greater abundance of open-environment fauna. The focus on small bovids (although other small mammals and suids are also found) indicates specialized hunting strategies, which have been proposed to have been in the form of snares and traps or an early instance of the bow and arrow.

== Evidence for Symbolic Behavior ==
Like the earlier Stillbay industry, creators of Howiesons Poort artifacts seem to have engaged in symbolic behavior, having left behind engraved ochre, ostrich eggshells and shell beads. There is a particularly abundant and diverse use of ochre as a pigment for objects or skin, which has been interpreted as reflecting an increasingly complex symbolic culture.

Researcher Sarah Wurz noted that "Not only was ochre collected and returned to the site but there is evidence in the ochre 'pencils' with ground facets that it was powdered for use. Ochre may have had many uses but the possibility that it was used as a body paint, and therefore had served a symbolic purpose."

At Diepkloof and Klipdrift, there is evidence of engraved ostrich eggshell containers. These were likely used to store water. At Diepkloof, these materials are found in at least eighteen different stratigraphic layers, indicating that this was a tradition that was passed down for thousands of years at the site.

Notched bone pieces have been found at sites such as Klasies River, Sibudu Cave, and Apollo 11. Additionally, a bone pin was found at Sibudu Cave and dates to around 26,000-35,000 years ago.

At Border Cave, the remains of a four to six-month-old infant were found along with a shell. The shell appears to have been perforated in order for it to hang. This finding has been interpreted as the oldest discovered modern human burial in Africa and the earliest instance of a human buried with personal ornamentation.

== Transition to Post-Howiesons ==
Interestingly, the end of the Howiesons Poort period is marked by a movement toward tool simplification and decreasing technological complexity. There is an absence of backed tools during this period as well as less strategic core reduction and unstandardized subsequent blanks. Assemblages that have been found consist mostly of unifacial flakes and scrapers. There are several hypotheses as to why tool technology seemed to become less sophisticated during this time.

=== Mobility Shift ===
One theory purports that this period was marked by an increase in residential mobility, and so the costs of investing time into carefully crafting tools began to outweigh the benefits of having a complex toolkit. When much time is invested into crafting tools, the tools must be used for relatively long periods of time. During periods of high mobility, however, it may become more advantageous to spend less time producing simpler tools. This way, more time can be spent exploiting resources before the group moves again. This theory is supported by ethnographic evidence showing that toolkits increase in complexity when the frequencies of annual moves decrease.

=== Climate Change ===
Another hypothesis is that Howiesons Poort and the preceding Stillbay period were developed as an adaptive response to very cold climates during MIS 4. The preceding period, MIS 5, had had warm temperatures, and so the human population increased. When this large population was faced with climatic deterioration during MIS 4, they developed Stillbay and Howiesons Poort through the pressure to survive. When MIS 3 emerged with warmer temperatures, these techno complexes were no longer necessary. Another hypothesis states that the severe conditions of MIS 4 caused a population increase towards the latter part, and so as groups of people became extinct the Howiesons Poort tools that they had been producing were abandoned. These hypotheses are supported by oxygen isotope records suggesting less favorable conditions during MIS 4.

A competing theory purports that, during MIS 4, climatic conditions made the areas of inland southern African inhospitable for human occupation. This caused a large-scale migration to and subsequent population increase in near-coastal sites. These high population densities facilitated transmission of complex skills and the development of Howiesons Poort tools. When inland areas became hospitable again during MIS 3, populations spread out again and these transmissions were lost. This hypothesis is supported by a between-site comparison of backed tools from Howiesons Poort layers, which found consistency in the templates and morphological similarities indicating that information on production of these tools was being spread throughout social networks.

=== Population Shift ===
A separate hypothesis argues that Howiesons Poort shows a period of population expansion and strong networks, allowing for the transmission of skills. The Post-Howiesons Poort era occurs during a period of population contraction and isolation of living groups, promoting instead the production of simpler tools. This is also supported by evidence of ubiquity in seemingly-symbolic material during the Howiesons Poort and the subsequent near-absence of it during the post-Howiesons Poort.

Finally, some believe that the end of Howiesons Poort was caused by an overall population decrease following MIS 4. This is supported by genetic data showing a population increase in Africa between 90,000-70,000 years ago. Although the model used does not show a subsequent decrease after this point, the research team has postulated that this may be due to insufficient data from the time.

== Sites ==
Selected Howiesons Poort sites from the ROAD database (CC BY-SA 4.0 ROCEEH)

- South Africa
  - Klasies River Caves
  - Howieson's Poort Shelter
  - Sibudu Cave
  - Peers Cave (Skildegat)
  - Diepkloof Rock Shelter
  - Nelson Bay Cave
  - Boomplaas Cave
  - Border Cave
  - Umhlatuzana
  - Rose Cottage Cave
  - Cave of Hearths
  - Sehonghong Moshebi's Shelter /Ntloana Tsoana
  - Montagu
  - Duinefontein
- Namibia
  - Apollo 11 Cave
  - Aar l
  - Bremen IC
  - Haalenberg
  - Pockenbanck
- Zimbabwe
  - Matopos : Nswatugi
