= Francesco d'Errico =

(b.1957) Italian archaeologist

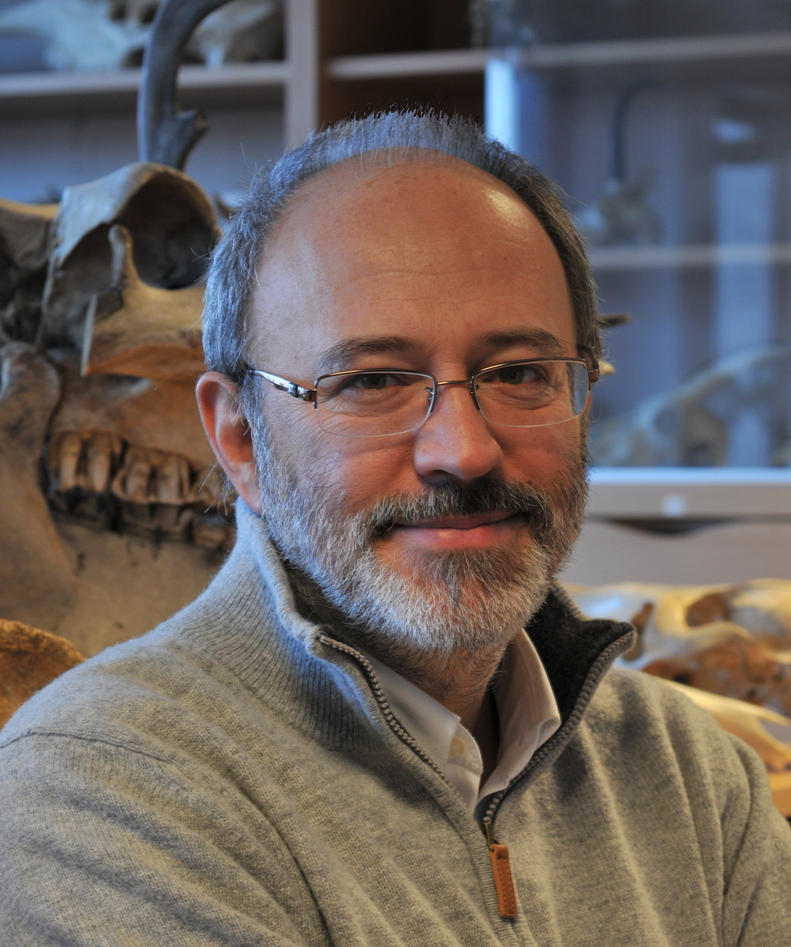
- Born: 24 September 1957 (age 69); Foggia, Italy
- Citizenship: Italian
- Education: University of Turin; University of Paris; University of Pisa
- Alma mater: Muséum National d'Histoire Naturelle; University of Bordeaux
- Spouse: Maria Fernanda Sanchez Goni
- Awards: CNRS Silver Medal; Fabio-Frassetto prize
- Scientific career
- Fields: Prehistory; Upper Paleolithic art Middle Paleolithic art
- Workplaces: University of Bordeaux
- Thesis: L'art Gravé Azilien (Azilian Engraved Art) (1989)
- Notable students: Lucinda Backwell
- Website: Francesco d'Errico at Univ. Bordeaux

Francesco d'Errico (born 24 September 1957 in Foggia, Italy) is an archaeologist who works as CNRS Director of Research at the University of Bordeaux in France and Professor at the Centre for Early Sapiens Behaviour, University of Bergen. In 2014 he was awarded the CNRS silver medal. In 2015 Giorgio Napolitano, president of Italy, presented him with the Fabio-Frassetto prize from the Accademia dei Lincei.

His research interests focus on the origins of modern behaviour in Hominins and specifically the emergence of cultural innovations in the African Middle Stone Age and the transition between Neanderthal and Cro-Magnon cultures.

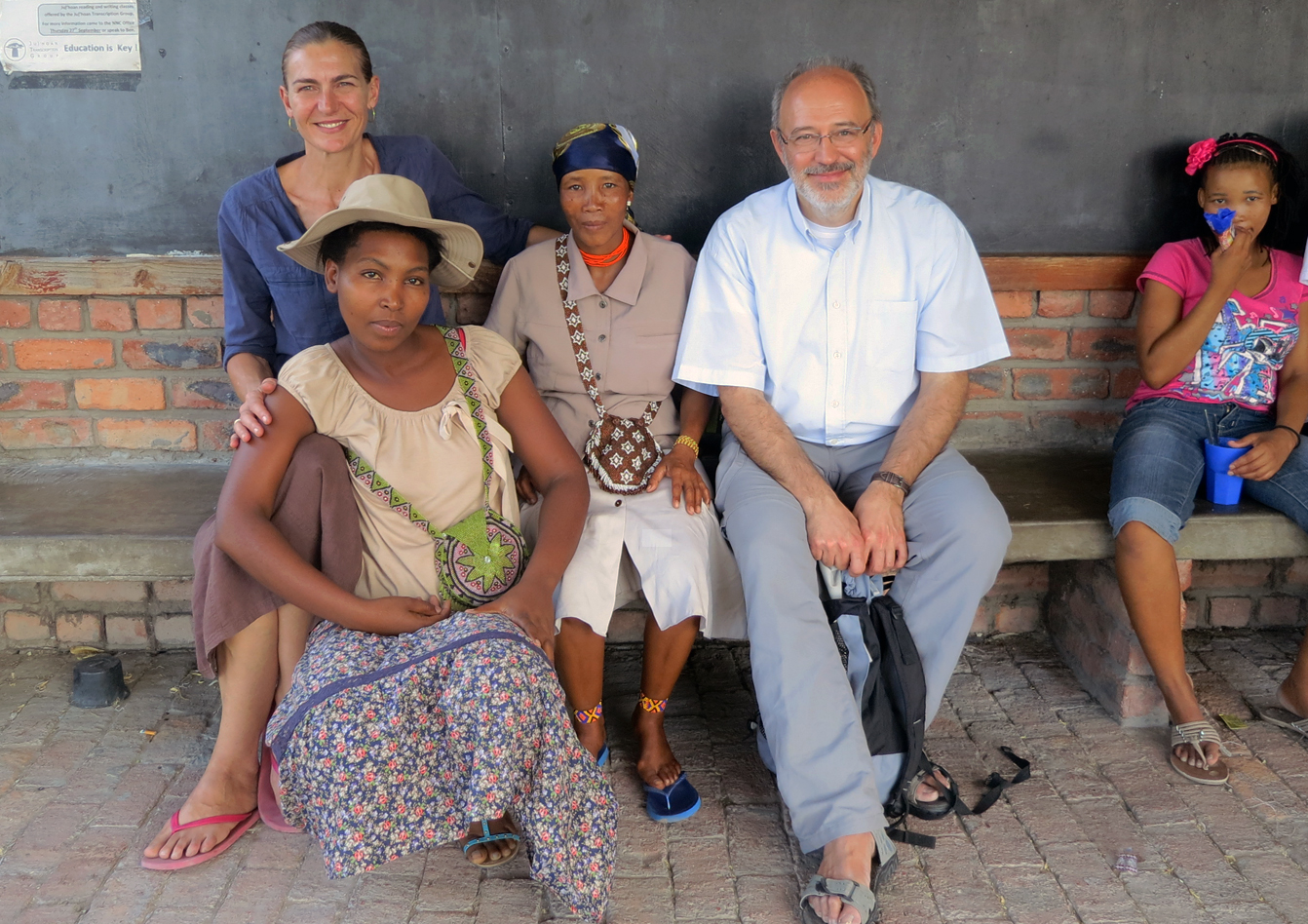
Francesco d'Errico (second right) and Lucinda Backwell (left back) with friends at Tsumkwe, Namibia.

== Education and career ==
d'Errico was born in Foggia, Italy and at the age of seven he was already searching for archaeological remains, in this case flint-stones, in the Puglia region of south-east Italy. His early education was at Liceo Classico Massimo d'Azeglio in Turin.

He completed a MA in Archaeology and Anthropology at the University of Turin in 1982 followed by a DEA in Prehistory and Quaternary geology at the University of Paris in 1985. During this time he was a fellow of the Italian Ministry of Research at the Institut de Paléontologie Humaine, Paris.

In 1986 d'Errico completed his Diploma di Specializzazione in Archeologia Preistorica at the University of Pisa and in 1987 he was visiting professor at the Muséum national d'histoire naturelle, Institut de Paléontologie Humaine, Paris. He completed his PhD in prehistory and quaternary geology at Muséum national d'histoire naturelle in Paris in 1989.

In 1991 he was employed as a contract researcher at Monrepos Archäologisches Forschungszentrum und Museum für menschliche Verhaltensevolution in Neuwied, Germany.

In 1992 d'Errico worked as a postdoctoral fellow at the Consejo Superior de Investigaciones Científicas, Madrid and from 1992 to 1993 he was a postdoctoral fellow at the University of Cambridge, England. In 1994 he was appointed research associate at the McDonald Institute for Archaeological Research of the University of Cambridge and joined the CNRS at the University of Bordeaux's De la Préhistoire à l'Actuel: Culture, Environnement et Anthropologie (PACEA) laboratory.

In 1999 d'Errico worked as a visiting professor at the University of the Witwatersrand (WITS), South Africa and between 2015 and 2017 he was a Professorial Fellow at the DST-NRF Centre of Excellence in Palaeoscience in the Evolutionary Studies Institute at WITS.

In 2003/4 d'Errico was Research Professor at the department of Anthropology of George Washington University in Washington, D.C. In 2003 he completed Habilitation à diriger des Recherches at the University of Bordeaux. In 2007 d'Errico was visiting professor at the department of Anthropology, Princeton University, New Jersey and between 2011 and 2015 he was associate professor at the Department of Archaeology at the University of Bergen.

Since 2017 he has held a professorship at the Centre for Early Sapiens Behaviour at the University of Bergen.

== Other fellowships ==
- 1987-1988 Fellow of the Fyssen Foundation, Paris. Awarded for "Analysis of new modes of expression of the beginning of the post-glacial period by the microscopic study of Azilian engraved pebbles."
- 1990-1991 Fellow of the NATO Science Program, Paris

== Research interests ==
d'Errico has worked in 17 countries, including China, Botswana, Morocco, the United States, the Netherlands and South Africa. His research has indicated that jewelry, engravings, pigments and tools made from bones were used in Northern and Southern Africa at least 80000 years ago, which is earlier than the previously accepted scenarios for the development of modern behaviour.

Some of his research interests are the evolution of human cognitive abilities as evidenced by the use of bone tools and symbolism, including grave goods used during burial rituals in the Paleolithic period and systems of notation from the same time period. He has studied the extinction of Neanderthals and their relations with the modern humans that replaced them; and the role climate change had on human evolution.

Research at Border Cave in South Africa, conducted with Lucinda Backwell and other colleagues, showed that beads, bone tools and other artefacts reminiscent of those used by San hunter-gatherers were already present in southern Africa 44000 years ago.

=== Current research ===
In 2019, d'Errico and his colleague Lucinda Backwell were collaborating on a book on the ethnoarchaeology of the San people from the Kalahari. The book is the result of the examination of San artefacts, collected by Louis Fourie between 1916 and 1928, by four San elders and their descriptions of the manufacture, use and meaning of these items.

== Selected publications ==
d'Errico has authored or co-authored 6 books:

- d'Errico, F. (1994). L'art gravé azilien: de la technique à la signification. Supplément à "Gallia préhistoire" (in French). CNRS éditions. ISBN 978-2-271-05247-6.
- Bosinski, G.; d'Errico, F.; Schiller, P. (2001). Die gravierten Frauendarstellungen von Gönnersdorf. Der Magdalénien-Fundplatz Gönnersdorf (in German). F. Steiner. ISBN 978-3-515-07799-6.
- Zilhão, J.; d'Errico, F. (2003). The Chronology of the Aurignacian and of the Transitional Technocomplexes: Dating, Stratigraphies, Cultural Implications; Proceedings of Symposium 6.1 of the XIVth Congress of the UISPP (University of Liège, Belgium, September 2-8, 2001). Trabalhos de arqueologia. Instituto Português de Arqueologia. ISBN 978-972-8662-15-8.
- d'Errico, F.; Backwell, L.; Tobias, P.V. (2005). From Tools to Symbols: From Early Hominids to Modern Humans; in Honour of Professor Phillip V. Tobias. Witwatersrand University Press. ISBN 978-1-86814-411-2.
- d'Errico, F.; Hombert, J.M. (2009). Becoming Eloquent: Advances in the Emergence of Language, Human Cognition, and Modern Cultures. John Benjamins Publishing Company. ISBN 978-90-272-3269-4.
- Henshilwood, C.S.; d'Errico, F. (2011). Homo Symbolicus: The dawn of language, imagination and spirituality. Critical human rights. John Benjamins Publishing Company. ISBN 978-90-272-1189-7.

In 2019, Google Scholar listed more than 20000 citations for Francesco d'Errico and ResearchGate listed more than 330 research publications and more than 10000 citations. Selected publications include:

- d'Errico, F. et P. Villa, 1997. Holes and grooves. The contribution of microscopy and taphonomy to the problem of art origins. Journal of Human Evolution. 33, 1-31.
- d'Errico, Francesco; Zilhão, Joao; Julien, Michèle; Baffier, Dominique; Pelegrin, Jacques (1998). "Neanderthal Acculturation in Western Europe? A Critical Review of the Evidence and Its Interpretation". Current Anthropology. 39 (S1). University of Chicago Press: S1–S44. doi:10.1086/204689. ISSN 0011-3204. S2CID 144799519..
- d'Errico F., Ch. Henshilwood, G. Lawson, M. Vanhaeren, A.-M. Tillier, M. Soressi, F. Bresson, B. Maureille, A. Nowell, J. Lakarra, L. Backwell, M. Julien. 2003. Archaeological evidence for the origins of language, symbolism and music. An alternative multidisciplinary perspective. Journal of World Prehistory 17 : 1-70.
- d'Errico, Francesco (5 August 2003). "The invisible frontier. A multiple species model for the origin of behavioral modernity". Evolutionary Anthropology: Issues, News, and Reviews. 12 (4). Wiley: 188–202. doi:10.1002/evan.10113. ISSN 1060-1538. S2CID 1904963.
- d'Errico F., Henshilwood Ch, Vanhaeren, M., Karen van Niekerk, K. 2005. Nassarius kraussianus shell beads from Blombos Cave: Evidence for Symbolic Behaviour in the Middle Stone Age. Journal of Human Evolution 48, 3-24.
- d'Errico, Francesco; Stringer, Chris B. (12 April 2011). "Evolution, revolution or saltation scenario for the emergence of modern cultures?". Philosophical Transactions of the Royal Society B: Biological Sciences. 366 (1567). The Royal Society: 1060–1069. doi:10.1098/rstb.2010.0340. ISSN 0962-8436. PMC 3049097. PMID 21357228.
- d'Errico F., Backwell L., Villa P., Degano I., Lucejko J.J, Bamford M.K., Higham, T., Colombini M.-P., Beaumont P.B. 2012. Early evidence of San material culture represented by organic artifacts from Border Cave, South Africa. Proc Natl Acad Sci USA, vol. 109 no. 33, 13214-13219.
- d'Errico, Francesco; Banks, William E. (2013). "Identifying Mechanisms behind Middle Paleolithic and Middle Stone Age Cultural Trajectories" (PDF). Current Anthropology. 54 (S8). University of Chicago Press: S371–S387. doi:10.1086/673388. ISSN 0011-3204. S2CID 144922210.
- d'Errico, Francesco; Banks, William E.; Warren, Dan L.; Sgubin, Giovanni; van Niekerk, Karen; Henshilwood, Christopher; Daniau, Anne-Laure; Sánchez Goñi, María Fernanda (24 July 2017). "Identifying early modern human ecological niche expansions and associated cultural dynamics in the South African Middle Stone Age". Proceedings of the National Academy of Sciences. 114 (30): 7869–7876. Bibcode:2017PNAS..114.7869D. doi:10.1073/pnas.1620752114. ISSN 0027-8424. PMC 5544275. PMID 28739910.
- d'Errico, Francesco; Doyon, Luc; Zhang, Shuangquan; Baumann, Malvina; Lázničková-Galetová, Martina; Gao, Xing; Chen, Fuyou; Zhang, Yue (2018). "The origin and evolution of sewing technologies in Eurasia and North America" (PDF). Journal of Human Evolution. 125. Elsevier BV: 71–86. Bibcode:2018JHumE.125...71D. doi:10.1016/j.jhevol.2018.10.004. ISSN 0047-2484. PMID 30502899. S2CID 54488324.
- d'Errico, Francesco; Colagè, Ivan (12 September 2018). "Cultural Exaptation and Cultural Neural Reuse: A Mechanism for the Emergence of Modern Culture and Behavior". Biological Theory. 13 (4). Springer Science and Business Media LLC: 213–227. doi:10.1007/s13752-018-0306-x. ISSN 1555-5542. S2CID 92719074.
- d'Errico, Francesco; Doyon, Luc; Colagé, Ivan; Queffelec, Alain; Le Vraux, Emma; Giacobini, Giacomo; Vandermeersch, Bernard; Maureille, Bruno (2018). "From number sense to number symbols. An archaeological perspective". Philosophical Transactions of the Royal Society B: Biological Sciences. 373 (1740) 20160518. The Royal Society. doi:10.1098/rstb.2016.0518. ISSN 0962-8436. PMC 5784044. PMID 29292345.

== Documentaries ==
d'Errico has featured in several documentaries and interviews, including the following. The complete list can be found on his webpage at the University of Bordeaux.

- Greg Konop (Interviewer) (2016). 7.5 Talking About the Archaeology of Complex Cultures with Francesco d-'Errico. Vienna: University of Wisconsin-Madison Kaltura MediaSpace.
- Kayla Mac Conachie (producer) (2017). Border Cave (YouTube). South Africa: Pacea Videos.
- "The color of the Ovahimba". Canal-U (in English and French). 9 October 2014.
- "San Ostrich Trap". Vimeo. 17 September 2019.
- "Gorham's Cave Engravings". Vimeo. 24 September 2019.

== Recognition ==
- In 2015 Giorgio Napolitano, president of Italy, presented d'Errico with the Fabio-Frassetto prize from the Accademia dei Lincei.
- In 2014 he was awarded the CNRS silver medal.
- Since 2014 d'Errico was included in list of Highly Cited Researchers by Clarivate Analytics.
- He is the most cited Italian researcher in the field of Humanities according to TopItalianScientists.org.
