= Stillbay =

African Middle Stone Age culture

Selected Stillbay sites from the ROAD database (CC BY-SA 4.0 ROCEEH)

The Stillbay or Still Bay industry was named by archaeologists A. J. H. Goodwin and C. van Riet Lowe in 1929, and is a Middle Stone Age stone tool manufacturing style after the site of Stilbaai (also called Still Bay) in South Africa where it was first described. It may have developed from the earlier Acheulian types. In addition to Acheulian stone tools, bone and antler picks were also used.

Its start and end are calculated at 71.9 ka and 71.0 ka. At present, too few data exist to limit the 95% confidence intervals of these date to more than 4 to 5 ky. However, available data are consistent with a duration of less than 1 ky.

Sampson in 1974 questioned its existence on the grounds that sites were not properly described and they lacked stratigraphic integrity However, more recent work from sites such as Blombos Cave and Sibudu Cave attest to its existence.

It is broadly analogous to the Mousterian culture in Europe.

Olduvai Gorge has within its many ages of tools, some of the Stillbay variety.

== Tools and fire ==
Researchers have concluded that Stillbay people prepared the silcrete stone out of which they made their stone tools with preheating in human made fire to increase its workability. Experiments involved slowly heating silcrete stones to ~350 °C. Thermoluminescence confirmed that all stones analysed (limited to 26 in number due this being a destructive process) had been heated to this temperature.

Heat treatment not only increases the length of flakes that can be removed from about a half-inch to 2 inches but makes them thinner, and sharper as they can remove flakes at angles nearly parallel to the stone's surface. Heat treatment allows greater precision of fracture due to increasing the uniformity of the stone's fracture response when hit.

This research identifies this not only with Stillbay sites dated to 72,000 BP but ones that could be as old as 164,000 BP.

Kyle Brown, one of the scientists responsible for this research has been quoted as making a link with the existence of language: "These people were extremely smart ... I don't think you could have passed down these skills from generation to generation without language."

=== Stone tool industry ===
A paper announcing the Still Bay Industry was published on January 5, 2007. This paper details the history of excavations at the site of Sibudu Cave, linking the levels of artifacts found beneath the higher level, the Howiesons Poort industry, to sites in South Africa, such as Blombos Cave and Hollow Rock Shelter, establishing a wider geographic range to an industry that was once thought to be limited to the western areas of South Africa. Another site, Umhlatuzana Rock Shelter, located in Kwazulu-Natal, South Africa has been linked to the Still Bay Industry, this based on comparison to the recent descriptions of Blombos Cave and Sibudu Cave. Serrated pieces are found at this site as well, potentially older or a regional variation.
