= Umhlatuzana Rock Shelter =

Archaeological site in South Africa

Coordinates: 29°49′39″S 30°48′52″E

- Interactive map of Umhlatuzana Rock Shelter
- Type: Rock shelter
- Periods: Marine Isotope Stage 5-1
- Cultures: Middle Stone Age, Later Stone Age, Iron Age
- Location: KwaZulu-Natal Province, South Africa

Site notes
- Height: 17.5 m (57 ft)
- Length: 47 m (154 ft)
- Width: 8 m (26 ft)
- Excavation dates: 1985, 2018-2019

Umhlatuzana Rock Shelter is an archaeological site located in KwaZulu-Natal Province, South Africa, near the suburb of Hillcrest. The site preserves a significant archaeological sequence spanning the later parts of the Middle Stone Age (MSA), the transition to the Later Stone Age (LSA) and the Pleistocene LSA, making it one of the few sites in southern Africa with continuous occupation through this important period.

== Research history ==
The site was discovered in 1982 by Dr. Rodney Maud during the construction of the Mariannhill Toll Road on the N3 Johannesburg-Durban highway. Initial excavations were conducted by Jonathan Kaplan in 1985, who opened a 6 m^{2} trench reaching bedrock at around 2.5 m depth. In 2010 OSL dating work was carried out at the site. Further geoarchaeological excavations were carried out in 2018 and 2019.

The shelter was formed within quartz arenite sandstone of the Ordovician Mariannhill Formation of the Natal Group. It is 47 m long, 8 m wide and 17.5 m high, facing northeast. The site is located approximately 60 m above the Umhlatuzana River..

During the initial rescue excavations, the Pleistocene sediments were observed to be very homogeneous throughout most of the 2m sequence. Further, there were suspicions of post-depositional sediment disturbance potentially mixing differently-aged deposits. This prompted geoarchaeological excavations in 2018 and 2019.

=== Stratigraphy and dating ===
The stratigraphic sequence at Umhlatuzana can be divided into two main groups:

- Group H (Holocene deposits) - approximately upper 50 cm
- Group P (Pleistocene deposits) - approximately lower 2 m

The Holocene deposits show a clearly layered stratigraphy and good preservation of organic materials such as charcoal and bone. The Pleistocene sediments are very homogeneous, having accumulated from the same source across the sequence, namely the attrition of the shelter bedrock. They are further characterised by the virtual absence of organic materials, but are very rich in archaeological materials..

A lateral offset in sediment colour as well as lateral differences in stone tool raw material had been interpreted to show large-scale sediment mixing, affecting the archaeological materials.. Geoarchaeological work shows find density to be horizontally distributed and micromorphological analysis shows no indications for large-scale sediment movements, although in some sections of the site intense bioturbation..

=== Archaeological findings ===
The site has yielded a rich collection of artifacts representing multiple cultural phases:

- Still Bay, and potentially pre-Still Bay
- Howiesons Poort
- Late MSA
- Transitional MSA/LSA
- earliest Later Stone Age
- Robberg.

Umhlatuzana Rock Shelter is particularly important for understanding the Middle to Later Stone Age transition in southern Africa. The site provides a continuous sequence through this period, though preservation conditions vary throughout the deposits. Studies showed that while some bioturbation occurred, the overall stratigraphic integrity of the site is better than previously thought, making it valuable for studying technological developments and human behavioral evolution in the region.

Stone arrowheads associated with arrow poison found in 1985 at Umhlatuzana Rock Shelter were later shown to have been coated with plant-derived poison from tumbleweed around 60,000 years ago, representing the earliest evidence of complex hunting strategies and technological innovation.
