= Black mussel =

Black mussel is a common name for several mussels and may refer to:

- Choromytilus meridionalis, native to southern Africa
- Mytilus galloprovincialis
- Mytilus trossulus, native to the north Pacific, Arctic, and north Atlantic oceans
