= Nelson Bay Cave =

Stone Age archaeological site in Western Cape, South Africa

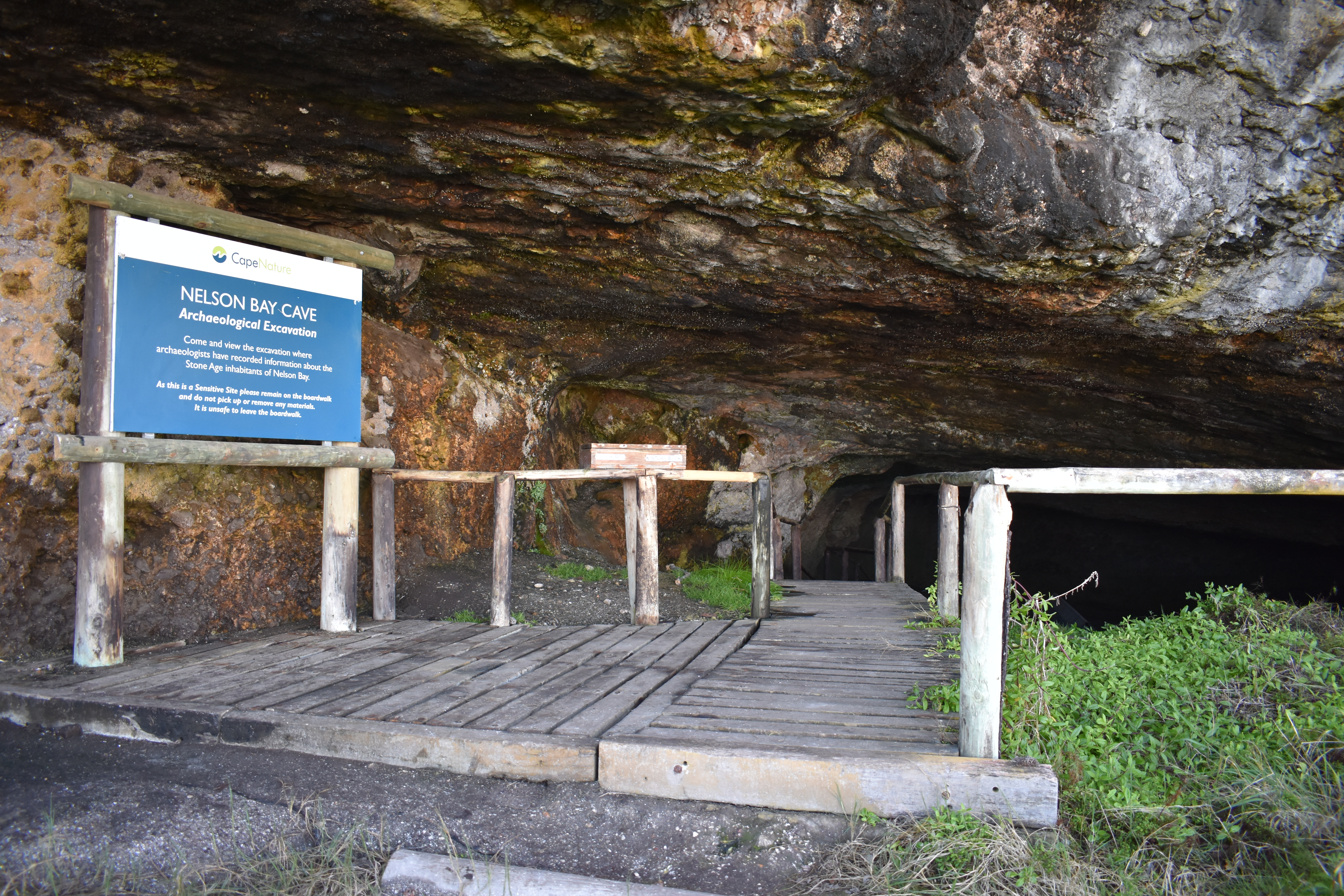
- Entrance to Nelson Bay Cave

- Location within South Africa
- Location: Plettenberg Bay, Western Cape, South Africa
- Coordinates: 34°6′4.07″S 23°22′32.20″E
- Discovery: First excavated in 1964
- Geology: Contact Breccia, Table Mountain Group, Uitenhage Group

Nelson Bay Cave, previously known as Wagenaar's Cave, is a coastal archaeological site in the Robberg Nature Reserve on the Robberg Peninsula in Plettenberg Bay, South Africa, about 250 km east of Cape Town. The cave is 18 meters (59 ft) wide and 35 meters (115 ft) deep, and the cave opening is 21 meters (68 ft) above mean sea level. The cave was amongst the first sites excavated in the southern Cape aimed at recording changes in terrestrial fauna caused by changes in climate and sea levels. It documents environmental changes during glacial and interglacial periods. Additionally, the cave is recognized for its Stone Age artifacts that show the transition from Middle Stone Age (MSA) to Later Stone Age (LSA) technologies. It has been regarded as a type-site (site where a particular industry, period, or any significant evidence was first studied in detail and can be used as a standard to be referenced by other sites) of the Robberg Later Stone Age Industry.

== Geological Background ==
The Nelson Bay Cave, including Hoffman's/Robberg Cave, Matjes River rock shelter located 14 km north of Keurboomstrand, and other smaller caves formed in the eroded cliffs of the Robberg Peninsula. Robberg Peninsula is 4 km long and is geologically composed of sandstones and quartzites of the Cape Supergroup. The peninsula's cliffs have erosional features caused by wave-cutting, differences in rock types, bedding, and other bedrock characteristics that have led to the formation of caves and notches. Nelson Bay Cave is located on the south-facing slope of the Robberg Peninsula in quartz-sandstone and quartzite deposits. The cave developed in a contact breccia found at the contact between Silurian Table Mountain Group quartzite and Cretaceous Robberg Formation of the Uitenhage Group quartzitic sandstone during a time when mean sea level was 14 – 20 meters (66 ft). The cave is eroded at the contact where overlying rocks are river-mouth deposits of the Uitenhage Group. Table Mountain Group soils in this area are characterized as being sand, low in pH, and low in plant productivity. Soils that developed from the Uitenhage Group deposits are variable and range from sandy loams to clay loams. The geological conditions of the cave have allowed for the preservation of archaeological material.

== Excavation History ==
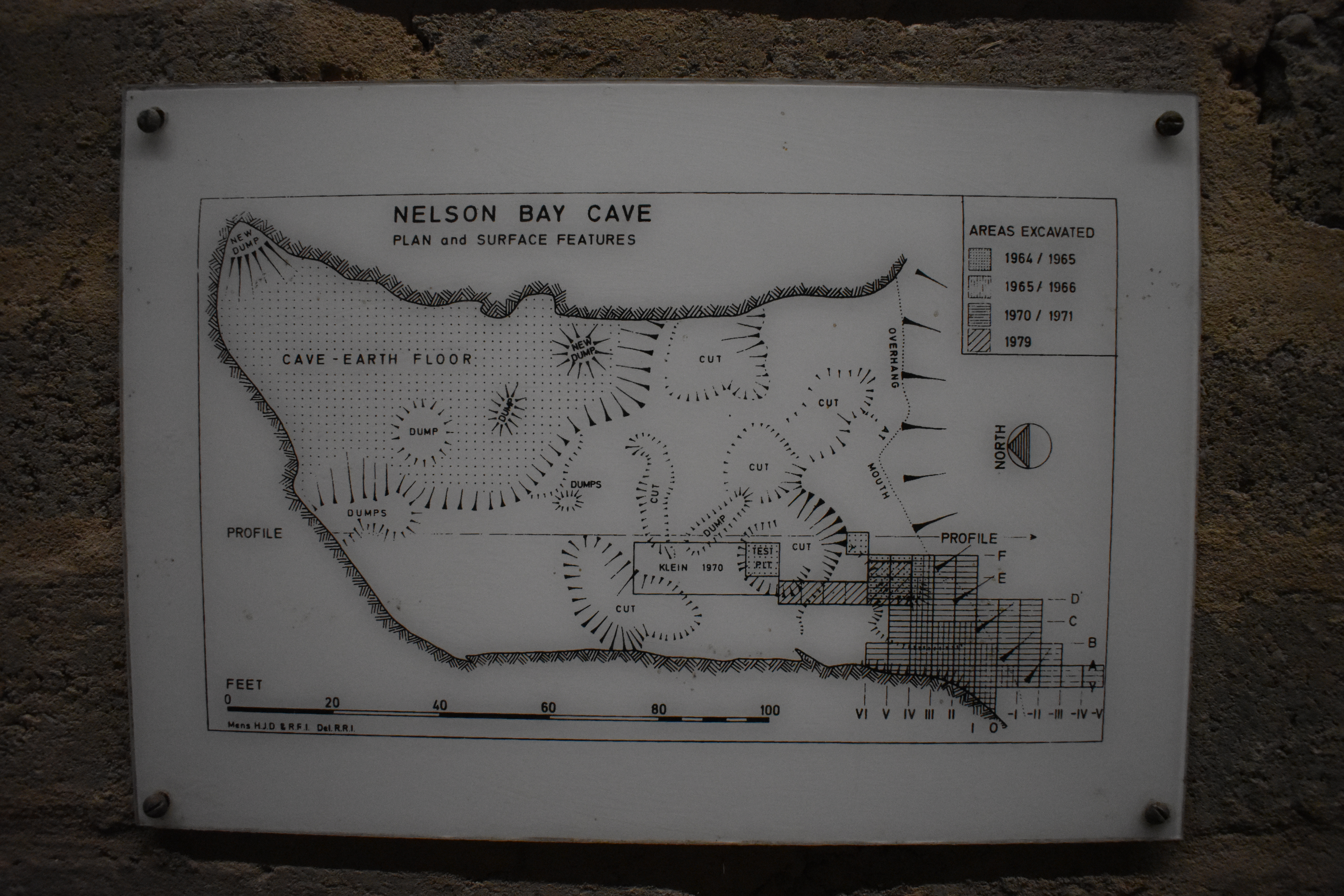
The cave's floor from initial excavations.

Initial excavations were carried out in 1964–1965 by Ray R. Inskeep, removing younger Later Stone Age deposits. The early excavations revealed evidence of pottery, sheep remains, human burials, stone tool artifacts, ochre fragments, and shell ornaments. Later excavations in the early 1970–1972 by Inskeep and Richard G. Klein exposed Middle Stone Age deposits and bedrock material, estimated to date to the late Marine Isotope Stage (MIS) 5. R. R. Inskeep continued excavations at the site till 1979. The cave was unofficially named the ‘Wagenaar’s Cave’, and unpublished documents referred to it as such. The cave was later referred to as the Nelson Bay Cave based on the official name of the path leading up to the cave, the Nelson Bay.

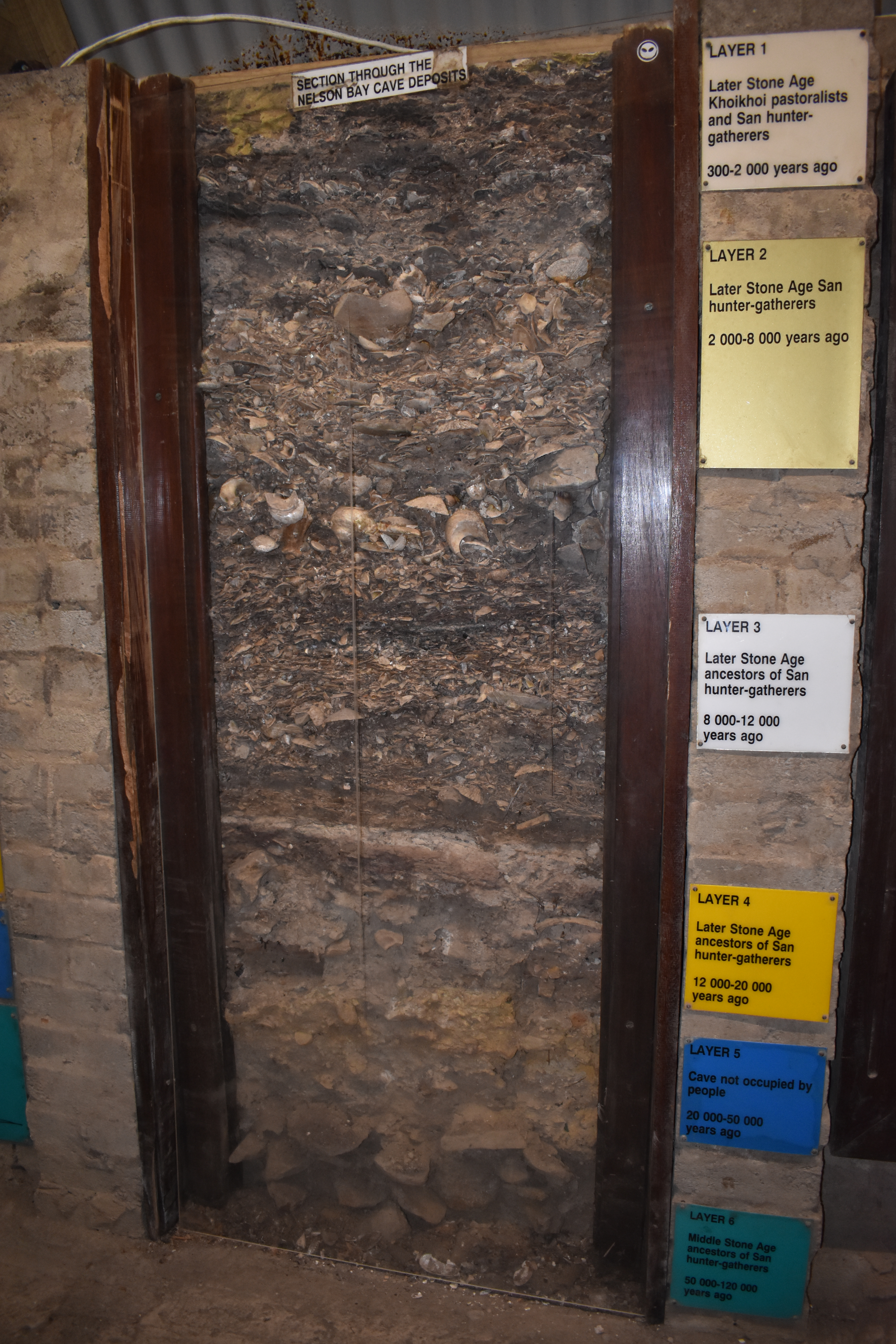
Cave wall showing the stratigraphic profile of Nelson Bay Cave from Middle Pleistocene till Holocene.

=== Stratigraphy ===
The cave's stratigraphy is divided into three main sediment layers: the lower bed, the intermediate bed, and the upper unit. The lower bed of the cave has MSA deposits that occur in sterile gray loam and iron-rich sediments. Above the sterile layer is a layer that mainly contains materials from the Robberg Industry. This is followed by LSA artifacts, including marine mammals and shell middens dated to the Holocene. These main sedimentary layers are then divided into smaller descriptive units. The bottom units are natural sediments and those include the basal loam (BL), pale brown loam (PBL), black loam I (BL I), black loam II (BL II), black loam III (BL III), rubble horizon, gray loam I (GL I), gray loam II (GL II), yellow stony loam (YSL), and brown stony loam (BSL). Following these are sedimentary units mainly consisting of cultural material. These include the gray-brown shelly loam (GSL), crushed shell midden (CS), brown soil below midden Jake (BSJB), midden Jake (J), midden rice A and B (Ra and Rb), brown soil below middens Glen and Helgren (BSBH/G), midden Helgren and Glen (H/G), brown soil below middens Ivan and Betsy (BSBB/I), middens Ivan and Betsy (B/I), and grey ash above midden Ivan (GAI). On top of GAI lies the pit fill, which has a mixture of debris and cultural material, which is also mixed with loamy sand. Abbreviations of the sedimentary units appear in later research and the full names are described by Klein (1972). Units from the basal unit till the pale brown loam are correlated to the interglacial and early glacial period; black loam I till the rubble horizon falls within the lower pleniglacial and inter-pleniglacial period; gray loam II till the BSBJ fall within upper pleniglacial and late glacial; and units from J till GAI fall within the Holocene.

Sediment units at Nelson Bay Cave and associated Stone Age Industries.
| Epoch | Unit | Archaeological finds | Stone Age | Age (start) |
|---|---|---|---|---|
| Holocene | Pit fill | Graves, pottery, seals, tortoise shells, domestic fauna (such as sheep), spurge flower, wild peach, mountain matenus, and shell pendants. | Post-climax Wilton | 4.4 ka BP |
| Holocene | GAI | Graves, pottery, seals, tortoise shells, domestic fauna (such as sheep), spurge flower, wild peach, mountain matenus, and shell pendants. | Post-climax Wilton | 4.4 ka BP |
| Holocene | B/I | Backed tools and small convex scrappers. Perforated white mussel shells, bovids (small browsers), shellfish, fish, dwarf eelgrass, sumac, persimmon, and graves. | Wilton | 9.2 ka BP |
| Holocene | BSBB/I | Backed tools and small convex scrappers. Perforated white mussel shells, bovids (small browsers), shellfish, fish, dwarf eelgrass, sumac, persimmon, and graves. | Wilton | 9.2 ka BP |
| Holocene | H/G | Backed tools and small convex scrappers. Perforated white mussel shells, bovids (small browsers), shellfish, fish, dwarf eelgrass, sumac, persimmon, and graves. | Wilton | 9.2 ka BP |
| Holocene | BSBH/G | Backed tools and small convex scrappers. Perforated white mussel shells, bovids (small browsers), shellfish, fish, dwarf eelgrass, sumac, persimmon, and graves. | Wilton | 9.2 ka BP |
| Holocene | Ra | Backed tools and small convex scrappers. Perforated white mussel shells, bovids (small browsers), shellfish, fish, dwarf eelgrass, sumac, persimmon, and graves. | Wilton | 9.2 ka BP |
| Holocene | Rb | Large quartzite scrappers, backed tools, grazing and browsing bovids, bone fish gorges, seals, and dolphins. | Albany | 12 ka BP |
| Holocene | J | Large quartzite scrappers, backed tools, grazing and browsing bovids, bone fish gorges, seals, and dolphins. | Albany | 12 ka BP |
| Pleistocene | BSJB | Large quartzite scrappers, backed tools, grazing and browsing bovids, bone fish gorges, seals, and dolphins. | Albany | 12 ka BP |
| Pleistocene | CS | Large quartzite scrappers, backed tools, grazing and browsing bovids, bone fish gorges, seals, and dolphins. | Albany | 12 ka BP |
| Pleistocene | GSL | Large quartzite scrappers, backed tools, grazing and browsing bovids, bone fish gorges, seals, and dolphins. | Albany | 12 ka BP |
| Pleistocene | BSL | Microbladelets, bladelet cores, small scrappers, large grazers, and extinct bovids, and ostrich. | Robberg | 23 ka BP |
| Pleistocene | YSL | Microbladelets, bladelet cores, small scrappers, large grazers, and extinct bovids, and ostrich. | Robberg | 23 ka BP |
| Pleistocene | YGL | Microbladelets, bladelet cores, small scrappers, large grazers, and extinct bovids, and ostrich. | Robberg | 23 ka BP |
| Pleistocene | GL II | Angular flakes and backed pieces. | Howiesons Poort | 40 ka |
| Pleistocene | GL I | Angular flakes and backed pieces. | Howiesons Poort | 40 ka |
| Pleistocene | Rubble Horizon | Angular flakes and backed pieces. | Howiesons Poort | 40 ka |
| Pleistocene | BL III | Flake blades and convergent flakes. | MSA | 125 ka |
| Pleistocene | BL II | Flake blades and convergent flakes. | MSA | 125 ka |
| Pleistocene | BL I | Flake blades and convergent flakes. | MSA | 125 ka |
| Pleistocene | PBL | Flake blades and convergent flakes. | MSA | 125 ka |
| Pleistocene | Basal Loam | Flake blades and convergent flakes. | MSA | 125 ka |

=== Dating of the site ===
Early archaeologists used shell middens, faunal remains, radiocarbon dating, relative analyses of the rock layers, and changes in tool technologies to date the site to between 5000 and 125,000 years ago. The cave is associated with pulses of human occupation throughout the MSA to the LSA and more stable and continuous occupation from the start of MIS 1 (ca. 11 700 years ago). Early excavators determined the ages of stone tool industries to be between 70,000 and 10,000 years old by using radiocarbon dating from charcoal from the site and correlating evidence from other archaeological sites such as Boomplaas cave. The Howeisons Poort industry dated to the MSA; Early LSA stone tool assemblages dated between 50,000 and 20,000 years; the Robberg industry dated between 12,000 and 8,000 years old; and the Wilton industry began around 8,000 years ago. Recent studies have updated the dates of the Later Stone Age sequence of the cave using radiocarbon dating and Bayesian models. The chronology and stratigraphy of Nelson Bay Cave show a change in environmental conditions over time, from sea level changes between MIS 5d and MIS 3, progressions in lithic technologies, and changes in subsistence strategies.

== Archaeological Finds ==
=== Lithic Artifacts ===
Nelson Bay Cave is recognized as a Stone Age archaeological site. The cave is well known for the Robberg Industry which was first described in detail at the cave and is named after the peninsula. The cave is primarily characterized by three stone tool industries including the Middle Stone Age, Howiesons Poort, and Robberg Later Stone Age Industries. Other lithic technology industries in the sequence are the Albany, Wilton, and Post-climax Wilton. Rocks used to make these tools are mainly quartzites and sandstones.

The early excavations from the site were designed to reveal MSA deposits contained in an iron-rich crust. The MSA tools on the cave's sequence have flake blades, convergent flakes, and retouched pieces. Following the MSA is the Howiesons Poort sequence found on a layer with artifacts concentrated and cemented together. The Howiesons Poort is characterized by flakes with triangular, trapezoidal, and truncated shapes and backed pieces. This industry represents the development of culture and tradition during the MSA. LSA cultural material and faunal remains are evidence of the Albany and Wilton Industries. The LSA Robberg industry is dated to about 23, 350 - 17, 600 cal BP and the earliest Albany/Robberg interface is dated to 12, 170 – 11, 660 cal BP. Robberg Industry tools in this cave are associated with microbladelets, small bladelet cores, backed tools, and few, small scrappers, where the primary source material is from quartz, silcrete, quartzite, and chalcedony. The Albany tools are large quartzite scrappers and backed tools. The most recent tool technology industries found in the cave are the Wilton and Post-Climax Wilton industries. The Wilton industry is characterized by many small convex scrappers, backed tools made of quartz and chalcedony.

=== Non-lithic Artifacts ===
Apart from being well known amongst archaeologists about its stone tools, Nelson Bay cave also has non-lithic materials that give insights into the culture of early cave dwellers. These materials include a variety of bone tools, shell beads, and pottery shards. Bone tools include awls, bone spatulas, arrowheads, hollow points, linkshafts, tubes, engraved bones, and rings. Tortoise shells occur in the youngest layers of the sequence (Post-climax Wilton) and have been associated with the movement of the cave dwellers and hand-to-hand exchanges. Shell pendants from ostrich eggshells and gastropods have been recovered from the sequence, including perforated white mussel (Donax serra) shells. Pottery shards occur in high densities from 455 BP to 1500 BP. Remains of sheep and cattle found on the top layers of the cave together with the pottery shards provide information about Khoikhoi farmers who occupied the cave in recent times.

=== Plant Remains ===
The Nelson Bay Cave's sequence has a wide range of preserved plant materials that have been used to relate to different subsistence strategies used by the caves's dwellers. Plant remains include seeds, wood fragments, and charcoal. Bugle lily (Watsonia) corms were amongst the first plant remains found in the cave including the African potato (Hypoxis). Other plant material include dwarf eelgrass (Zostera capensis) preserved in a mussel shell and seeds of bully trees (Sideroxylon), Sumac (Rhus), and persimmon (Ebenaceae) family. Seeds of spurge flower (Jatropha capensis), wild peach (Kiggelaria africana), and mountain maytenus (Mytenus oleoides) were brought in by birds and not attributed to human diets in the cave. Charcoal fragments have been primarily used by archaeologists to date the sequence.

=== Animal Remains ===
The presence of different animal remains shows different foraging strategies that were used by the cave dwellers. Large mammals such as bovids show that the people who occupied the cave were large game hunters. The presence of small animals shows a shift in diets and hunting practices. Lastly, there is an abundance of shellfish remains in the top layers of the sequence showing a shift into exploiting coastal resources. The Nelson Bay Cave sequence shows that there was a megafaunal extinction event in southern Africa during the late Pleistocene where two fossils of extinct bovid fossils (Megalotragus and Pelorovis) are found at the cave. Ungulates found at the cave include springbok (Antidorcus australis), and buffalo (Syncerus antiquus). Fossils of bird species include cape gannet (Morus capensis), albatros (Thalassarche sp.), cape cormorant (Phalacrocorax capensis), and African penguin (Spheniscus demersus). Additionally, Late Pleistocene hominin tracks have been found along the margin of the Paleo-Agulhas Plain including mammalian tracks (e.g., golden mole) along the Robberg Nature Reserve.

Fossils found in earlier layers (from YGL to BSL) include those of Cape pangolin, black-backed jackal, Egyptian and water mongoose, brown hyena, Cape fur seal, quagga, warthog, giant buffalo, Grimm's duiker, hartebeest, wildebeest, giant alcelaphine, cape hare, and porcupine. Those that occur from the early LSA Robberg to the late Holocene Post-climax Wilton industry include Chacma baboons, rock hyrax, bushpig, cape buffalo, southern reedbuck, grysbok, and vaalribbok. Modern human remains are found during the Middle to Late Holocene units including water mongoose, sea elephant, bushbuck, blue duiker, and dolphins.

== Paleoenvironments ==
The cave has evidence of human occupation dating back to 125,000 years ago, with occasional Middle Stone Age occupations and serves as an important site for the Robberg Later Stone Age industry. Additionally, the cave is located on the coast of the southern Cape and provides insights about the Paleo-Agulhas Plain (PAP).

=== Sea Level Changes ===
The coastline moved 100 km seaward, and the sea level dropped to 130 meters during the Last Glacial Maximum. The PAP was exposed during glacial periods and became increasingly covered toward the end of the LGM with increased sea levels. Dune formation and increase occupation in early and later MIS 3 to early Holocene.

=== Vegetation Shifts ===
The cave also shows vegetation changes during the late Pleistocene and Holocene. From 22 000 to 14 000 years extensive grasslands covered the coastal plateau in the Plettenberg Bay area. Large grazing animals dominate the LGM sequence of the cave, and small browsers dominate the post-glacial period. Bovid teeth found in the cave have been to show climatic and ecological changes. Isotope samples from bovid teeth show a mixture of an LGM with a mixture of C_{4} and C_{3} grasslands with C_{4} grasses dominating. The Nelson Bay Cave LGM deposits show evidence of C_{4} grassland during colder phases and a C_{3} grassland in the eastern zone of the cave, showing a seasonal shift between C_{3} and C_{4} grasses. Animals that roamed this grassland included giant buffalo, an equine close to the quagga, springbok and alcelaphine antelopes: blesbok/bontebok, wildebeest, hartebeest, and a giant alcelaphine. Furthermore, there was an expansion of the winter rainfall zone to the east during the LGM.

=== Diet Changes ===
The faunal remains of Nelson Bay Cave have been used to explain food and resource exploitation during the MSA to LSA transition as they show hunting preferences and dietary shifts. The Holocene units show a resource exploitation shift where the sequence has marine mammals and an increase in bone tools. The presence of fish and marine mollusks has been used to infer the distance from the coast to the cave. There is also a replacement of shrubland with browser fauna. At this time, dietary shifts from faunal remains show ecological changes and adaptations over time as a response to environmental changes.

== Significance of Nelson Bay Cave ==
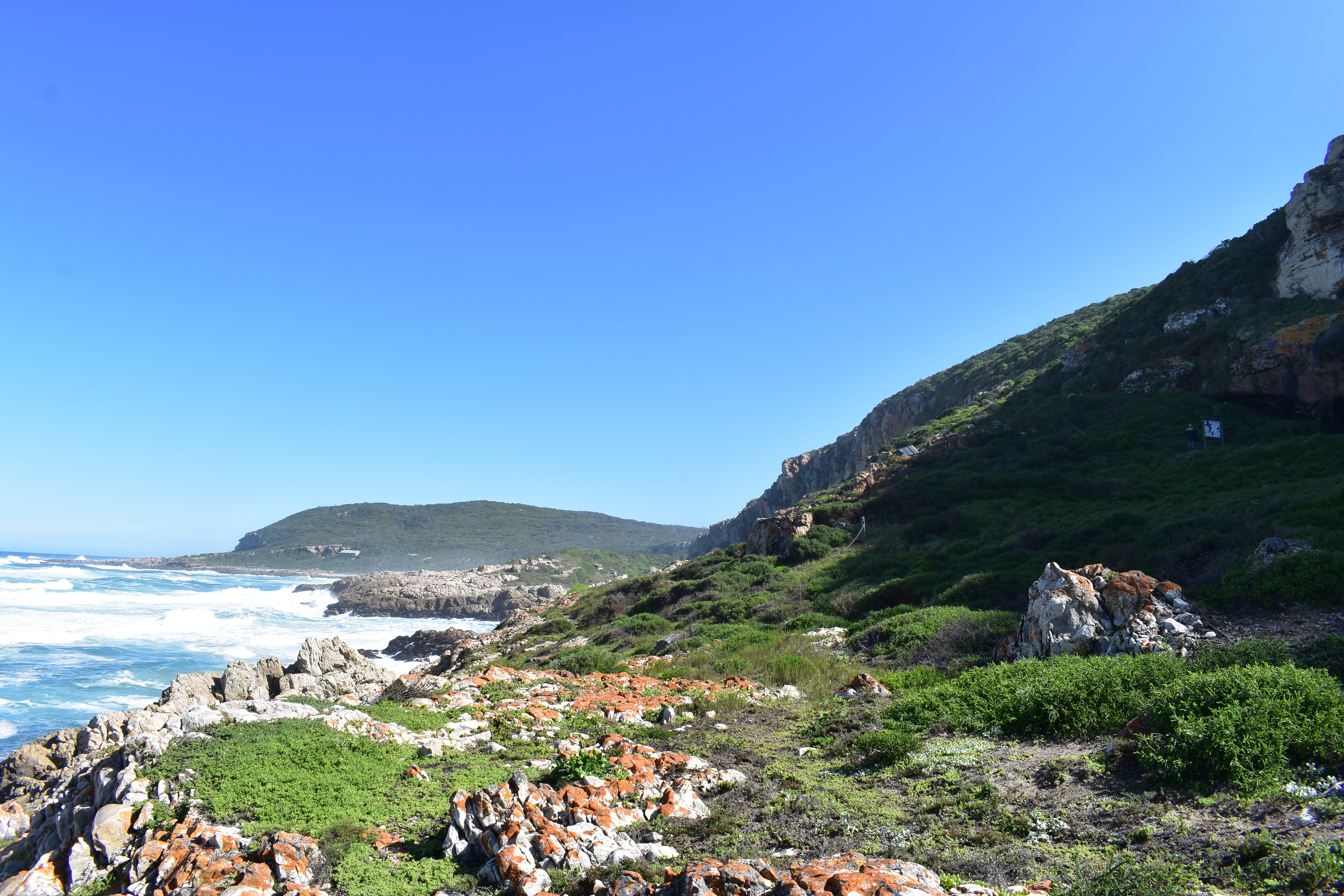
View of the Robberg Peninsula, Pletternberg Bay, from outside the cave.

Nelson Bay Cave shows a long and intermittent occupation of humans dating back to 125,000 years, allowing archaeologists to learn and understand early humans and their development over thousands of years. This includes seeing how their environment has changed, the different foods diets early humans had and how those changes, and seeing the development of tool technologies over millennia. The cave shows evidence of key environmental changes during the glacial and interglacial period, and sea level changes that have exposed and submerged the Paleo-Agulhas Plain. Records of these changes have been used to understand the climate and environmental changes at a larger scale and seeing how human populations have adapted to these changes. These adaptations have given rise to debates about the evolution of modern human behaviors.

The first is the interpretation of the archaeological evidence found at the cave bringing into question technological and cultural practices of cave dwellers over centuries. These debates are based on four parts, the chronology and dating of the site, interpretation of the archaeological record, palaeoenvironmental changes, and the aspect of human adaptation and living strategies. Klein (1972) mentioned issues about the dating of the site, especially in layers that were dated based on their relativity to archaeological materials. Loftus et al. (2016) provided new radiocarbon dates filling in the chronological gaps between the Middle Stone Age and Later Stone Age, and highlighting the role of the cave during the MSA/LSA transition.

Some of these debates also include the rise of culture at the cave where researchers such as Siqveland (2015) suggested that modern cultural behaviors at the cave appeared earlier than what Richard Klein may have suggested. This is coupled with the presence of cultural material found in the cave that shows complex cultural and social practices. Moreover, the adaptations have resulted in the rise of different stone tool technologies that have been significant for the Stone Age archaeological record of southern Africa. Where, the Robberg Industry was first described leading to the cave being recognized as a type-site for this type of technology.

Lastly, during the first excavations burials were uncovered near the entrance of the cave, the remains being in a fetal position, and decorated with shells and ochre. These burials have been used to provide insight about burial practices and behaviors of modern cave dwellers.

== Heritage Status ==
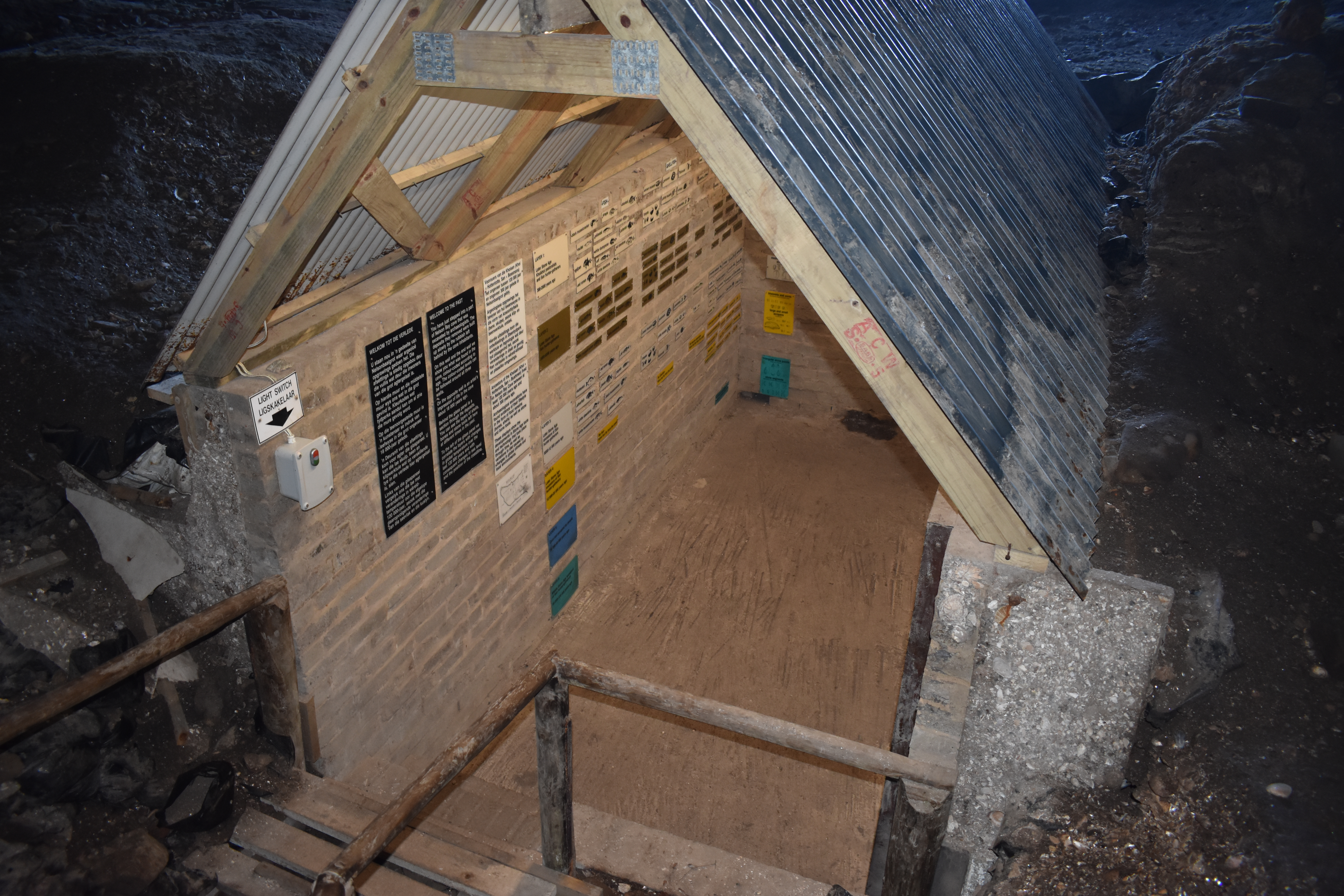
Archaeological Display structure built to maintain the integrity of the cave walls at Nelson Bay Cave.

Nelson Bay Cave and the rest of the Robberg Peninsula fall within the Robberg Nature Reserve, a provincial heritage site monitored by Cape Nature. The Robberg Nature Reserve and Marine Protected Area was also declared a marine protected area by the Department of Environmental Affairs and Tourism in December 2000. In 1993, Janette Deacon and Michael Brett proposed a display area for the cave to preserve its integrity and avoid erosion and degradation. This proposed display included a brick wall to prevent the collapse of the east and west excavation walls and a siphon to catch water from cutting into the cave. Currently, a walkway leading to the site's display exists, showing an intact section profile from the original excavations and illustrations that tell the story of the cave.

== See also ==
- Wilton Culture
- Robberg Nature Reserve and Marine Protected Area
- Last Glacial Maximum
- Boomplaas Cave
- Blombos Cave
- Late Stone Age
- List of caves in South Africa
