= Boomplaas Cave =

Archaeological site in South Africa

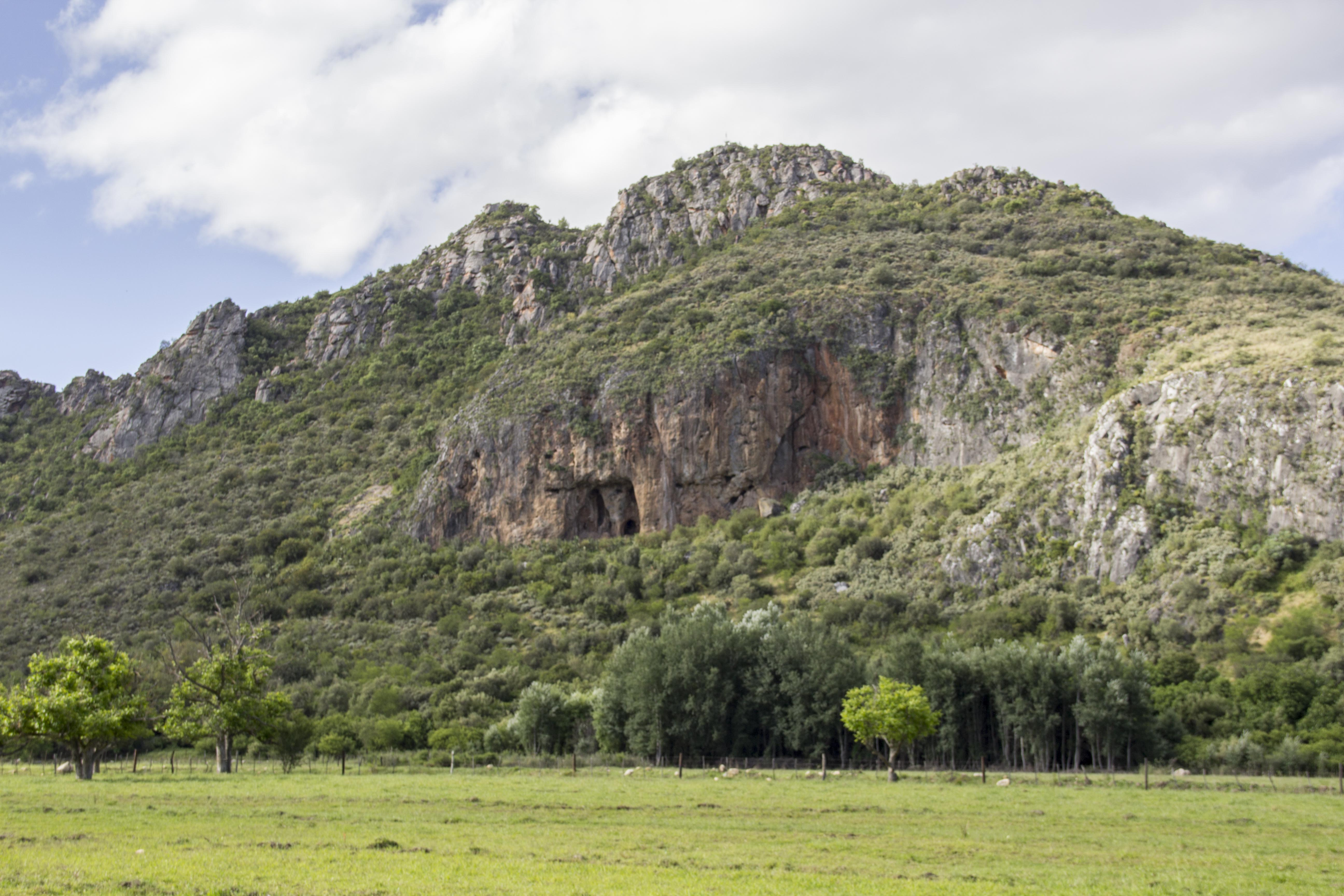
- Picture of Boomplaas Cave, South Africa

- location in South Africa Boomplaas Cave (South Africa)
- 33°22′14″S 22°9′31″E
- Type: Cave, Rock shelter
- Periods: Pleistocene, Holocene
- Cultures: Khoikhoi, Wilton culture, Albany Industry, Robberg Industry, Howiesons Poort, MSA, LSA
- Location: Cango Valley, Western Cape Province, South Africa
- Region: Eden District Municipality

Site notes
- Material: Precambrian limestone outcrop
- Area: 225 m^{2} (2,420 sq ft)
- Excavation dates: 1974 to 1979, 2020–present
- Archaeologists: R. O. Moffett, H. J. Deacon, Janette Deacon, Richard G. Klein, D. Margaret Avery, David Daitz, Anton Scholtz, Marlize Lombard, Johan Binneman, Justin Pargeter, Brian Chase, J. Tyler Faith

Boomplaas Cave is located in the Cango Valley in the foothills of the Swartberg mountain range, north of Oudtshoorn, Eden District Municipality in the Western Cape Province, South Africa. It has a 5 m (16 ft) deep stratified archaeological sequence that spans the past 60,000 to 80,000 years, representing discontinuous occupations and hunter-gatherer/herder acculturation. The cave has served multiple functions during its occupation, such as a kraal (enclosure) for animals, a place for the storage of oil rich fruits, and as a home-base for hunter-gatherers. The site's documentation contributed to the reconstruction of palaeo-environments in the context of changes in climate within periods of the Late Pleistocene and the Holocene. Faunal remains and plant material have also been used to reconstruct the diets of the sites occupants. Stone Age adzes have been found at the site, along with lithics from the Wilton, Albany, Robberg, Howiesons Poort industries. Other notable finds include painted marker stones and pottery.

== Excavation ==
The excavation of Boomplaas Cave A was conducted by H.J. Deacon (in affiliation with the University of Stellenbosch) from 1974 to 1979 as part of an archaeological and palaeo-ecological study to provide information on changes in vegetation and fauna, the cultural sequence, and the function of the cave in the area. This project was associated with excavations at the Klasies River and sites between the Cape Fold Mountains and the coast. Boomplaas was selected as the site for investigation due to its extensive stratigraphic sequence of human occupation during the Holocene and Upper Pleistocene and it being a limestone cave with conditions favorable for preserving bone.

The early research executed by H.J. Deacon and his collaborators and the ongoing excavation efforts produce a chronology of the cave's nonoccupational and occupational layers, complete with evaluations of the botanical remains, faunal remains, and the Middle Stone Age (MSA) and Late Stone Age (LSA) lithic assemblages found at the site.

== Dating Methods ==
Until recently, the older layers at Boomplaas could not be dated due to the time cap for radiocarbon dating, prompting a need for alternative dating methods at the site.

The members associated with the Howieson's Poort technocomplex were dated using amino acid racemization (AAR) on ostrich eggshell beads. Ostrich egg shells were selected as the cultural material to date with AAR as they were thought to represent a closed amino acid system. This dating method at the site was an effort to provide context for the Howiesons Poort Industry and its date ranges beyond the limited capacity of radiocarbon dating. For the OLP member, a date range of 40 ka to 48 ka with a range of 50 ka to 62 ka for the Howiesons Poort assemblages. However, these results were controversial as there was a low sample size of ostrich eggshell at Boomplaas. A linear fit calibration was completed in the same publication to account for the potential error in the results, placing the date range at 59 ka to 71 ka.

Uranium series analysis was conducted on dripstone at the site in an attempt to date the Howiesons Poort OCH member of Boomplaas. Using this dating method, uranium and thorium isotopes were evaluated in a small stalagmite uncovered in the OCH member. This dating method produced an age range for the Howiesons Poort technocomplex of 60 ka to 70 ka.

The most recent dating efforts using accelerator mass spectrometry (AMS) C14 provide new dates for all members excluding BOL through LOH, contextualizing occupation intensity and technological adaptation at the site. The AMS dates and previous C14 dates were modeled using Bayesian statistical methods and Deacon's established stratigraphic sequences. Occupation intensity was gauged by comparing the stone tool frequency, associated material, and the age of each depositional layer.

== Deposits ==
Depiction of the stratigraphic layers at Boomplaas Cave

The formation process for Boomplaas Cave is slow, resulting from a combination of washed in silts and sand and the natural weathering of limestone. The age of the members range from the Late Pleistocene to the 19th century, with the deposition of sediments occurring at a rate of 50 mm per one thousand years. Boomplaas has a current cave floor size of 225 m^{2}, which has decreased in the far past because of roof collapse. The stratigraphy of the Boomplaas deposits is documented in sets of broadly contemporary layers (members), individual layers (units) and parts of layers (sub-units). The members recognized in the Boomplaas sequence are described as follows, from the top to bottom:

Stratigraphy
Member	Dating	Important Information
CBM	19th century	Member CBM corresponds to nineteenth-century historical documentation indicating that colonial Europeans used the cave as a kraal for sheep. The sediment consists of thick, burnt sheep dung.
DGL	1,800–1,000 cal BP	Member DGL consists of white, calcified dung layers and gray soil. During this period, Boomplaas cave was intermittently occupied and used as a stock post by the ancestral Khoikhoi. Notable finds within this Member include pottery fragments, hearth features, stone artifacts, and wild and domesticated animal remains.
BLD	4,100–1,400 cal BP	In member BLD, the cave was used to store jacket plum (Pappea capensis) fruit in storage pits lined with gifbol (Boophone disticha) leaves. Sixty pits were found in total, with the complete remains of three pits still intact. Ethnobotanical research suggests that the fruit was most likely stored for cosmetic purposes instead of sustenance due to the oil it produces. The harvesting and storage of these fruits would have occurred on a seasonal basis. Edible staple foods, such as Hypoxia villosa and bulge lily (Watsonia) corms, were also found in the member. Other finds include painted marker stones.
BLA	9,200–4,400 cal BP	Dating to the mid-Holocene, the BLA member includes elongated charcoal-filled beds of an unknown function. The features are located in the same portion of the cave as the storage pits in Member BLD. Other notable finds from member BLA include lithics from the Wilton technocomplex and a painted marker stone.
BRL	14,100 and 9,700 cal BP	The BRL Member in Boomplaas coincides with the early Holocene and terminal Pleistocene and consists of sandy sediment with partial rubification. The layer is characterized by circular hearths, stone tools of the Albany technocomplex, and animal remains discarded by humans. Artifact concentration in Member BRL suggests brief occupation sequences.
CL	17,400–14,000 cal BP	Member CL consists of carbonized sandy loam and connects to the terminal Pleistocene. The high density of the artifacts and faunal remains in Member CL characterizes Boomplaas Cave as a potential home-base site with long occupation sequences. Archaeological finds in Member CL include stone tools from the Robberg Industry, tortoiseshell bowls, bone tools, charred plant remains, faunal remains, and beads and water containers made from ostrich eggshells.
GWA/HCA	21,600–17,600 cal BP	GWA/HCA consists of leached, ashy deposits. The lithic assemblage of GWA/HCA diverges from member LP in raw material preference, tool reduction strategy, and retouched tool frequency.
LP	25,400–21,700 cal BP	Member LP was occupied during the Last Glacial Maximum (LGM). The sediment is composed of dark brown loam with clasts from the cave ceiling. The stone tools of member LP have been attributed to the early LSA with the presence of bipolar cores, single platform irregular cores, and thin unretouched flakes. Other artifact finds include ostrich eggshell fragments.
LPC	27,300–25,800 cal BP	LPC is characterized by multiple occupational sequences with sediment consisting of brown organic loam and charred plant material. Archaeological materials obtained from LPC include quartz miniaturized bladelets, and bone points.
YOL	30,100–27,600 cal BP	Named after its sediment composition of yellow oxidized loam, member YOL is a non-occupational deposit. YOL contains both MSA and LSA stone tools with a raw material preference for vein quartz.
BP	49,000–29,800 cal BP	The sediment for member BP exhibits unoccupied sequences with a prevalence of micromammals and occupied units characterized by charred plant material and hearths. The lithic assemblage, associated with the ash features, includes long late MSA flake blades.
OLP	45,400–40,300 cal BP	OLP consists of brown and dark yellow loam with clast rock fragments. OLP 2 exhibits a high frequency of micromammal bone that has been used to reconstruct humidity levels in the paleoenvironment. These micromammal bones have also been used to indicate longer periods without human occupation. Archaeological evidence within OLP includes a MSA lithic assemblage and two ostrich eggshell beads.
BOL	59,800–45,600 cal BP	BOL is sediment comprising brown sandy loams and carbonized material. The stone tools found in BOL are classified as MSA and include triangular flakes on facetted platforms and blades.
OCH	65,300–56,800 cal BP	OCH consists of unweathered limestone that fell to the cave floor from the walls and ceiling. Previous uranium-series AAR dating placed the age estimate of member OCH at ~60–65 ka. Occupation during this period was fleeting as carnivores and raptors are believed to be responsible for the accumulation of faunal remains in the member. The limited archaeological assemblage of OCH includes stone tools identified as belonging to the Howiesons Poort Industry with an array of unifacial points and a singular biface point recovered from the member.
LOH	> 65,000 cal BP	LOH is the basal layer directly above bedrock, consisting of sandy loam. A small assemblage of lithic implements was recovered here, including laterally retouched scrapers and adzes. These tools were generally classified as belonging to the MSA with no industry specified.

== Paleoenvironmental Research ==
Boomplaas receives approximately 400 mm of rainfall per year, with summer temperatures ranging from 12 °C to 23 °C and winter from 6 °C to 19 °C. The current environment is characterized by high evapotranspiration rates corresponding to its proximity to semi-arid Karoo and a large presence of C4 vegetation. Boomplaas is located in the Southern Cape's aseasonal rainfall zone, which is situated between the winter rainfall zone (WRZ) to the west and the summer rainfall zone (SRZ) to the east. The interaction between these two atmospheric systems is believed to have shifted over time, with different periods corresponding to the dominance of different rainfall systems. Surrounding the Southern Cape are two intersecting oceanic currents impacting the region's climate. Research has attributed occupation frequencies at the site, particularly in the member CL, to rising sea levels and coastline regression. The abundance of proxy climate indicators within the archaeological record and the dynamics between the meteorological systems make Boomplaas a favorable site to study human behavioral variability with environmental change.

=== Faunal Analysis ===
Faunal remains are dispersed throughout the layers and are a product of human occupational discard and nonoccupational micromammal debris from roosting owls. Richard G. Klein conducted early excavation efforts and analyzed larger taxa, and D. Margaret Avery evaluated the micromammal assemblages. Faunal remains were used as proxy climate indicators to chronologically reconstruct the environmental conditions of Boomplaas, with a particular emphasis on the Late Pleistocene and Holocene.

Analysis of micromammals dropped by roosting owls at Boomplaas has helped researchers investigate climatic changes. Avery first analyzed micro mammal assemblages at the site in 1982. She selected Boomplaas Cave as one of her locations to study the microfauna of the Southern Cape because of the sheer abundance of remains and its geographical association with the coast and the Cape Fold Mountains. In her 1982 publication, Avery argued that there was a harsh and arid environment during the Last Glacial Maximum (LGM), citing low taxonomic diversity and the dominance of Saunder's vlei rat and forest shrew in the archaeological record.

In his 1978 and 1983 publications, Klein focused on ungulate relative frequencies to establish grassland spread surrounding Boomplaas. Focusing on members CL through BP, he determined that the abundance of grazers during the LGM correlates to widespread grassland. More recently, J. Tyler Faith provided an updated overview of the large faunal remains at Boomplaas. Between members CL and BP he found a dominance of alcelaphine antelope which favor intermediate humidity and are rare in dry conditions. During the Holocene, he observed an increase in small bodied ungulate taxa that thrive in more arid conditions which would point towards relatively humid conditions during the LGM with a decrease in moisture during the Holocene.

=== Botanical Remains ===
The current vegetation surrounding Boomplaas Cave corresponds to the Succulent Karoo biome. The plant regimes of the Southern Cape are argued to be influenced by fire, climatic variables, and soil. The upper layers of Boomplaas exhibit the preservation of macrobotanical remains, and the lower stratigraphy features pollen samples. Assessments of the fossil charcoal remains in the 1980s were featured in publications by H.J. Deacon, with the analysis executed by his students David Daitz and Anton Scholtz. Initial palynological research was done in 1984 by H.J. Deacon and his colleagues was expanded upon in 1988 in another publication by Janette Deacon and Nick Lancaster.

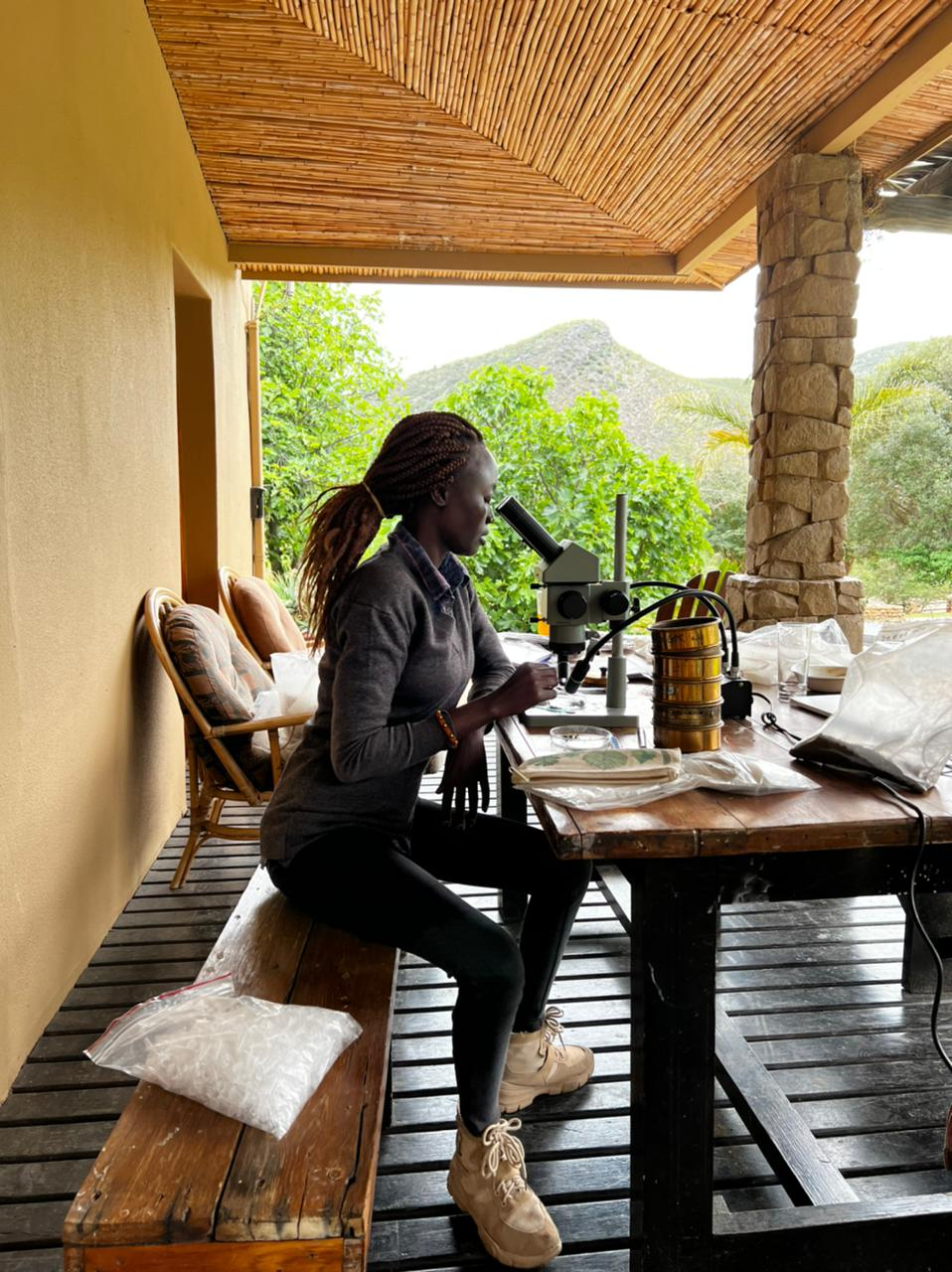
Researcher studying the botanical remains at the site

Fossil charcoal has been used to reconstruct the paleoenvironmental conditions of Boomplaas Cave through species richness. H.J. Deacon and Scholtz's publications highlighted the low taxonomic diversity in the member GWA/HCA with a high frequency in Asteraceae, with a particular dominance of Euryops. On the other hand, members representing the end of the Pleistocene and the Holocene (CL, BLD, and BRL) showed a high taxonomic frequency with a low rate of Asteraceae trees. H.J. Deacon and Scholtz used these taxonomic distributions to assert that the climate during the LGM was most likely frigid and dry.

Pollen analysis of the LGM environmental record by H.J. Deacon exhibited a low taxonomic diversity of only nine different pollen types. This was complemented by a high frequency of the cold-tolerant Elytropappus-type of Asteraceae. The palynological record was interpreted as evidence for an arid LGM and a more temperate Holocene. This initial analysis of the paleobotanical data aligned with Deacon's review of the site's charcoal remains.

=== Major Debates ===
The nature of precipitation in the Southern Cape has been a highly contested topic at Boomplaas, particularly in the LGM. Interpretations of the proxy climate indicators at the site have traditionally aligned with an understanding that the climate during the LGM was harsh and dry, with the average temperature 6 °C lower than today. However, recent research at the site challenges the assumption that Boomplaas was relatively arid during the LGM.

A paper written by J. Tyler Faith, Brian M. Chase, and Justin Pargeter used the data from the faunal and botanical remains at Boomplaas to reinterpret climatic conditions during the LGM. They determined that the proxy climate indicators point towards relatively humid and cold conditions during the LGM. They argue that due to the range in sampling methods the temporal trends in species diversity for charcoal become negligible. In their analysis of previous palynological studies, they reveal a correlation between the number of grains counted and number of pollen types which could account for the perceived lack of diversity during the LGM. For the changes in vegetation during the LGM, they highlight temperature as a driving force of shifts in species diversity. They interpret the dominance of grazers and expansion of grassland during the LGM as corresponding to wetter conditions. These conclusions are reached through consideration of modern vegetal regimes and an understanding of how climate, temperature, and soil impact the ungulate species fluctuations in the Southern Cape.

In 2016, Judith Sealy and colleagues conducted isotopic analysis (δ13C) on teeth from bovid, equid, and unknown caprine specimens, finding that the LGM was characterized by a prevalence of C3 grasses. The temperature during the growing season determines the ratio of C3 to C4 grasses, as high temperatures and an extended SRZ favor C4 growth, while low temperatures and a broadened WRZ favor C3 growth. Higher distributions of C3 grasses match with an expansion of the WRZ and colder temperatures during this time, corroborating that Boomplaas was humid and cold during glacial periods. Between 40,000–36,000 cal. BP and 17,000–14,000 cal. BP C4 grasses were more extensive, signifying that these periods were warmer and had a greater SRZ.

== Diet Reconstruction ==
An ethnobotanical distribution of food source plants within a day foraging range was provided in 2024 by Marlize Lombard and Justin Pargeter, reexamining theories on available plant food resources for the Stone Age occupants. Around 137 edible plants currently grow in this spatial range around Boomplaas. Lombard and Pargeter found that many of the species/ genera of plants found around Boomplaas today were also present in older deposits, including those dating back to MIS 3 and 2. The study showed that hunter-gatherers most likely had access to a range of grass grains, seeds, and leaves in addition to tubers.

J. Tyler Faith's 2013 publication detailing the taphonomic and paleoenvironmental implications of the faunal remains at Boomplaas shows a size preference for mammals in the human diet. The paper highlights four potential sources of accumulation, including rodents (mainly porcupines), raptors (the Cape eagle owl), leopards, and humans. Cut marks or hammerstone percussion marks were present in the human-modified faunal remains, marking anthropogenically significant modification of the bones. Anthropogenic significance is lowest in the oldest members (closer to 65,000 years ago), intermediate in the MSA/LSA members (from 50,000 to 20,000 years ago), and highest in the youngest members. In the oldest members, LOH and OCH, carnivores and raptors were responsible for depositing all large faunal remains. In members BOL through GWA, the large mammal remains presented a mix of carnivore, raptor, and human taphonomic modification. The BOL to GWA members exhibit periods of brief human occupation, with the anthropogenic remains suggesting a size preference for large ungulates. Humans were the primary accumulator of large faunal remains at Boomplaas Cave in the LSA deposits, consistent with previous assertions of an increase in occupation intensity at the site from the end of the LGM through the Holocene.

== Archaeological Discoveries ==
=== Lithics ===
==== Holocene Lithic Assemblages ====
Adzes that initially appeared in the archaeological record in the Later Stone Age are also found throughout the Holocene. In the mid-Holocene, these stone adzes were found with traces of mastic, indicating that they were likely hafted. The preservation of hafted lithic implements in the Holocene members allows archaeologists to examine the relationship between the size of the stone tools and how they are shaped to fit their handles. Toolmakers at Boomplaas shaped the convex scrapers to fit their handles through reduction.

==== Late Pleistocene Assemblages ====
Preservation constraints in the Late Pleistocene members have led to a lack of hafted stone implements in the archaeological material at Boomplaas. However, the intentional shaping of the tools in these layers indicates hafting on some of the older lithic implements.

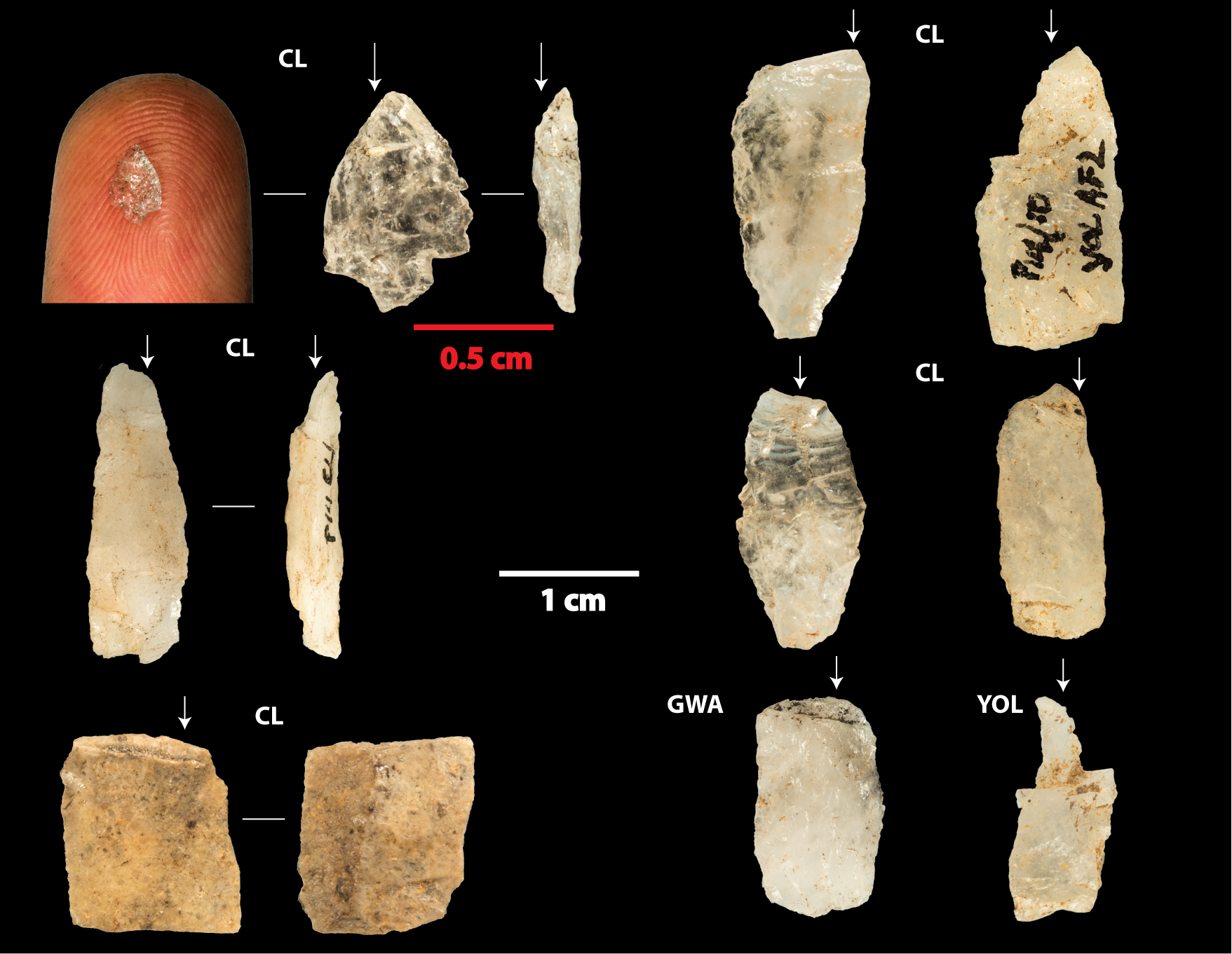
Picture of microliths found at Boomplaas

Between 29,000 and 12,000 years ago, the lithic assemblages at Boomplaas exhibit lithic miniaturization, distinguished by backed tools, bladelets, and small unretouched tools, flakes, and cores. Analysis of the stone tools from the late glacial period showed that bipolar cores were used to make small flakes. Increased reduction, bladelet, and bipolar technology coincided with increased site occupation intensity at this time. Implement morphology is thought to be a technological response to shifting climatic conditions.

Retouched stone adzes, characterized by an oval or rectangular shape with side retouch, began to be used at Boomplaas around 14,200 BP. A flake or split pebble is retouched to produce its shape until the working edge is concave. Johan Binneman and Janette Deacon studied wear traces on the Late Stone Age tools at Boomplaas, finding that the Later Stone Age adzes exhibit wood polishing, coinciding with their hypothesized role in woodworking. Binneman and Deacon's study compared an experimental sample that was worked on local wood to the archaeological sample from members CL, BRL, BLA, BLD and DGL at Boomplaas.

==== Lithic Industries ====
- Wilton Industry - Members BLA, BLD, and DGL comprise the Wilton Industry at Boomplaas Cave. This technocomplex shows an increase in backed lithics and a reduction in scraper size. In member BLD, a small quartz convex scraper measuring 14.7 mm long and 15.9 mm wide was excavated from Pit 27. This scraper was originally mounted with resin, although its handle is missing. The asymmetrical application of the resin indicates that the tool was produced to be used transversally. This find showed that the scrapers were replaceable and that glue was used to attach them to their handle. Lithic use-wear analysis revealed that the mounted scraper was used for leather working. During the Wilton Industry, convex scrapers had the highest frequency of the stone tools styles.
- Albany Industry- The BRL member, corresponding to the beginning of the Holocene, exhibited a reduced frequency in scrapers. However, these scrapers are comparatively larger than those featured in the Wilton Industry, with a doubled width in working edge morphology. During the Albany Industry, the lithic assemblage also showed fewer microbladelets than older members. Regarding raw material preference, quartz dominates the Albany Industry.
- Robberg Industry- The Robberg Industry occurs in member CL at Boomplaas, featuring unretouched microbladelet cores and small scrapers. Archaeological samples at Boomplaas aligning with this technocomplex exhibit a raw material preference of quartz. The distinctly small Robberg Industry bladelets, roughly 16mm long, were struck from pyramidal cores. These bladelets are often found in clusters.
- Howiesons Poort Industry- Members BOL and OCH correspond to the Howiesons Poort Industry. The Howiesons Poort technocomplex is an MSA industry with stone tool production characterized by backed tools, bladelets, and the use of transported raw materials.

Middle Stone Age (MSA)- The stone tools recovered from member LOH are classified as MSA without a specified industry.

=== Ochre and Rock Art ===
The paintings at Boomplaas cave are associated with the Holocene dating members and convey the hunter-gatherer economy of its occupants. Painting stones is a regional Holocene tradition in the Southern Cape. The lithic artifacts within the layers that the painted stones were found connect them chronologically to the Wilson Industry.

Member BLD- Three painted marker stones are associated with the Pappea capensis storage pits in member BLD, indicating the location of the pits.

- The stone found in conjunction with Pit 9 depicts a red antelope and an amorphous painted patch on a weathered limestone face.
- The stone associated with Pit 37 portrays a black-and-white eland antelope with a dewlap painted on a stone block.
- The painted stone associated with Pit 57 is a quartzite river cobble. It depicts a red-painted ostrich with outstretched wings. The sediment below has streaks of paint, and the figure is located on the lower surface of the cobble, suggesting that it was deliberately placed facing downwards while the paint was still wet.

Member BLA- Unaffiliated with the BLD fruit storage pits, Pit 77 in the occupation layer of member BLA is an ash-filled depression where a singular painted marker stone was found.

- The painted stone found in Pit 77 is a quartzite river cobble. It depicts two legs descending from a red amorphous figure with white paint smudged over the upper left side of the painted face.

Member DGL- From the pottery sherds excavated from member DGL, 64 or 6% of sherds had ochre applied to the outer surface. The majority of pottery sherds from this member are made from fine clay and have a red coloring, indicating firing at a high temperature with oxidation. As the vessels were typologically and morphologically consistent with Cape Coastal Pottery, pottery production in DGL is attributed to the ancestral Khoi. Ochre was also found in the non-artifact debris of this member.

== Broader Impacts ==
With the help of PAST and the Leakey Foundation, Justin Pargeter helped refurbish the decaying infrastructure of the site in 2015. In 2020 J. Tyler Faith and Brian M. Chase joined the Boomplaas excavation team to reestablish research efforts at the site.

Spatial mapping of the archaeological material using a total station

The ongoing excavations at Boomplaas Cave are oriented around analyzing the MSA/ LSA transition. Planned methods for in-situ dating include optical luminescence (OSL) and C14 dating. Micromorphological samples of the sediment will be taken to provide information on the composition of the layers. The archaeological material relating to the MSA/LSA transition, such as lithic implements and bone, will be spatially captured through the use of total stations. This allows for the 3D GIS mapping of material dispersal and concentration throughout the stratigraphy.

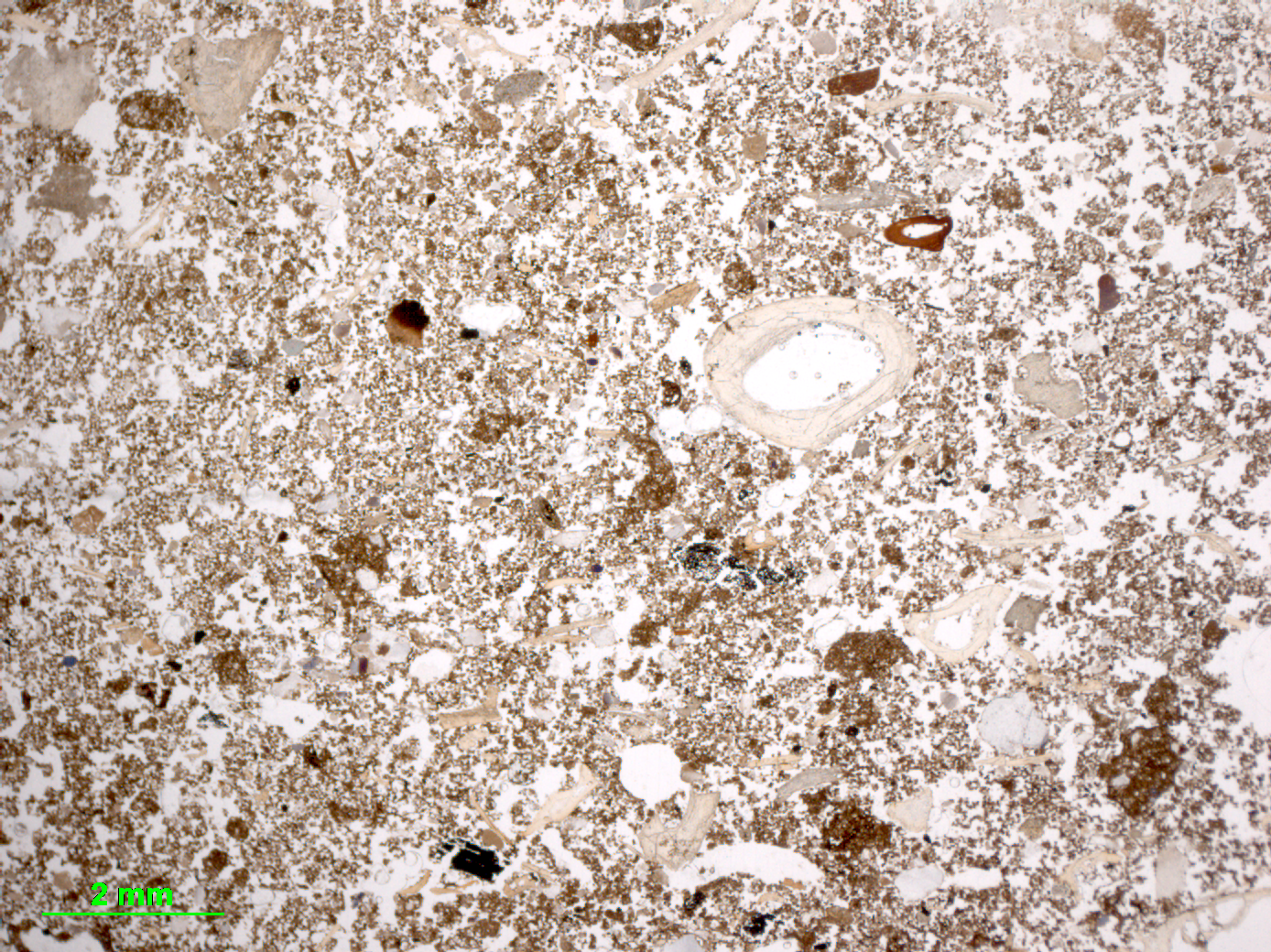
A micromorphological sample taken from Boomplaas

A recently published article by Marlize Lombard and Justin Pargeter details the botanical taxonomies surrounding Boomplaas and the inferences that can be drawn about the plant based food sources available to Stone Age foragers. The published data will be employed in future excavation efforts to interpret how plant frequencies fluctuated over time with climatic change. It will also be used to gauge how people developed methods to counter toxicity in some of these plant foods by cooking them or understanding the impact of seasonality. In current excavations, floatation is used to recover a maximal amount of plant material.

== See also ==
- Blombos Cave
- Klasies River Caves
