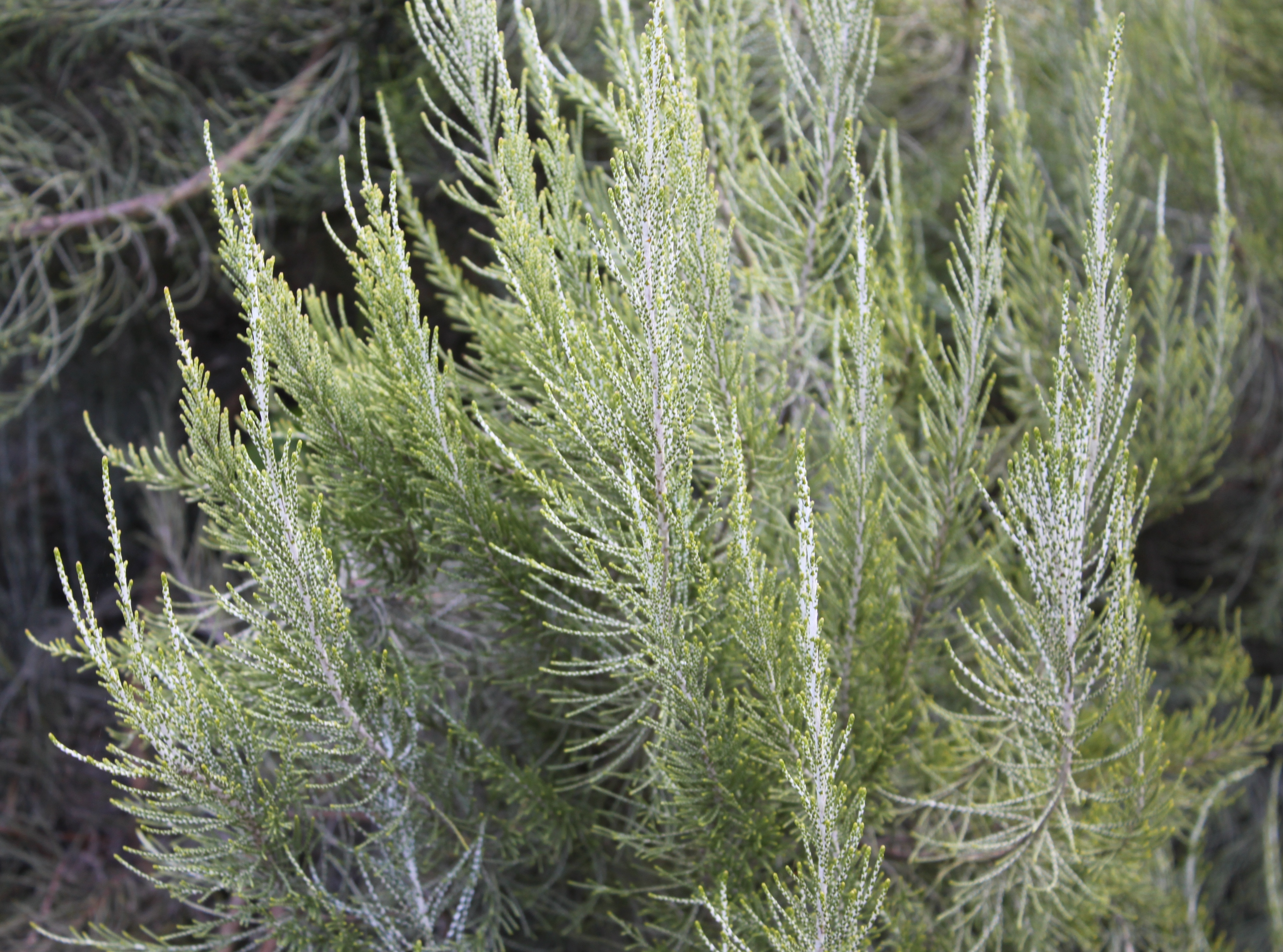
- Renosterbos or Elytropappus rhinocerotis

Scientific classification
- Kingdom: Plantae
- Clade: Tracheophytes
- Clade: Angiosperms
- Clade: Eudicots
- Clade: Asterids
- Order: Asterales
- Family: Asteraceae
- Subfamily: Asteroideae
- Tribe: Gnaphalieae
- Genus: Elytropappus; Cass.

Synonyms
- Cyathopappus Sch.Bip.; Achyrocome Schrank

= Elytropappus =

Genus of flowering plants

Elytropappus is a genus of flowering plants in the family Asteraceae, native to southern Africa.

Species

- Elytropappus aridus Koek.
- Elytropappus hispidus (L.f.) Druce
- Elytropappus microphyllus
- Elytropappus monticola Koek.
- Elytropappus scaber (L.f.) Levyns
