= Wilton culture =

Archaeological culture from Africa

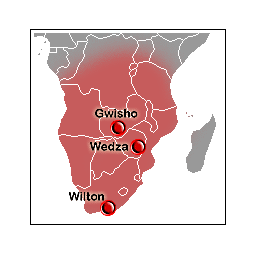
Map of Wilton culture sites and region

Wilton is a term archaeologists use to generalize archaeological sites and cultures that share similar stone and non-stone technology dating from 8,000 to 4,000 years ago. Archaeologists often refer to Wilton as a technocomplex (Archaeological culture), or Industry. Technological industries are defined by a common tradition of stone tool assemblages, but these technological industries extend to common cultural behaviors. As such, archaeologists use these industries to define a discrete cultural taxonomy. However, technological industries have the potential to generalize different cultures and communities at regional scales that, in more local settings, are distinguishable in both technology and cultural behaviors.

== History ==
Wilton Site Locations
Wilton archaeological site locations
1 Wilton Large Rockshelter
2 Amadzimba Cave
3 Blombosfontein 1-6
4 Blydefontein
5 Boomplaas
6 Buffelskloof
7 Byneskranskop 1
8 Cave James
9 Colwinton
10 Diamond Shelter
11 Dikbosch 1
12 Elands Bay Cave
13 Gehle Shelter
14 Good Hope Shelter
15 Grassridge
16 Havens Cave
17 Jagt Pan 1
18 Jakkalsberg N
19 Jubilee Shelter
20 Kabeljous River Shelter
21 Kangkara Cave
22 Leliehoek
23 Maqonqo
24 Matjies River
25 Meerlust 1
26 Melkhoutboom
27 Mgede Shelter
28 Mzinyashana Shelter
29 Namtib
30 Nelson Bay Cave
31 Nkupe Shelter
32 Numas Schlucht Cave
33 Oakhurst
34 Pienaars Pan 1
35 Rooikrans
36 Rose Cottage Cave
37 Sehonghong
38 Shongweni South
39 Sophiso
40 Springbokoog 1,5,13,20
41 Tloutle
42 Tshangula Cave
43 Tshisiku Shelter
44 Uniondale
45 Zoovoorbij

Originally defined from archaeological assemblages recovered from Wilton rock shelter in 1921, archaeologists use Wilton to refer to Stone Age foraging and pastoral communities in portions of east Africa and throughout South Africa that are associated with small stone tools and an increase in the number of formal stone tools like scrappers and backed tools. Archaeological assemblages in Zambia contains evidence for non-stone technology that has led some archaeologists to hypothesize an increased importance of wooden tools Wilton tool sets.

Archaeologists initially recognized Wilton foraging communities from the Holocene beginning 8,000 years ago up through the Iron Age until 500 years ago, though recent studies separate Wilton from the final late Stone Age at 4,000 years ago. Despite Wilton as a term meant to generalize the behaviors of human populations, foraging communities that utilized Wilton-like technology and exhibited Wilton-like behaviors can be found in near-coastal, inland, and montane environments. These diverse landscapes contradict the specificity of Wilton culture that archaeologists had hoped to encompass with this term. In fact, archaeological deposits and isotopic data show that Wilton foragers used a wide range of technologies and exhibited diverse behaviors including diets, mobility, and exchange networks.

Early accounts of Wilton archaeological assemblages posit that similar technology equates to identical cultural identities, suggesting prehistoric communities represented a single culture that ranged from southernmost South Africa to as north as Zambia. Archaeologists characterize Wilton by a greater variety of stone tools and smaller, more formal, stone technology. Additional wooden and bone tools lead archaeologists to think that biological materials played an important role in communities that made Wilton technologies. This technology distinguishes Wilton technology from earlier technological industries such as the Oakhurst. Oakhurst technology dates from 12,000 to 8,000 years ago and is defined as a technological industry that contains few formal tools and large stone tools, especially large stone scrappers. Previous technological industries like the Oakhurst may have included biological tools like bone and wooden implements, but since biological remains do not survive in the archaeological record, archaeologists are not able to always use these biological tools to define technological industries. It is these changes in stone and non-stone technology that imply changes in cultural behaviors of foragers at these sites and thus, have caused some archaeologists to recognize Wilton technology as a single cultural entity.

Wilton is widely described as a shift from large to small stone technology with an emphasis on stone scrappers and backed tools, though not all sites associated with Wilton contain high numbers of backed tools. This discrepancy offers some evidence that broad categories like Wilton overgeneralize behaviors of people whom, though may have had some cultural activities in common, exhibit diverse tool sets. Many archaeologists acknowledge that Wilton is not a single culture or identity but, instead, solely reflects general trends over small regions in Zambia, Zimbabwe, Transvaal, and most of South Africa from 8,000 to 4,000 years ago.

=== Wilton rock shelter ===
Wilton technology was first described by John Hewitt after he excavated with the collaboration of C. W. Wilmot a cave on the farm Wilton near Alicedale in the eastern Cape of South Africa. Later sites are found along the coastal and the interior of South Africa and as north as the countries Zambia and Zimbabwe. The Wilton site is adjacent to the Karoo region of South Africa and represents a diverse environment that could have easily supported forager groups living in this area. Three dates came from the Wilton rock shelter that ranged from 8,260 to 2,270. This date range allowed archaeologists to track changes in the size and type of stone technology through the Wilton site and initially defined Wilton technology. The observed environment and time constraints at this site, among others like the Oakhurst site and Matjes River, provide archaeologists with insight into a time range in which foragers produced Wilton technology and thus, exhibited shared technological industries.

At the Wilton site, Hewitt first noted that this site contained remnants from two distinct cultures, distinguishable by the size of the stone tools. The stone preceding Wilton technology appeared much larger at the Wilton site. Based on the large size of the stone tools, Hewitt supposed that this material pertained to a predecessor of Wilton technology, known today as Oakhurst. The significant component of Wilton sites is decreased tool size compared with Oakhurst and an increase frequency of stone scrapers. Furthermore, the stone material at the Wilton rock shelter is predominantly Chalcedony. This assemblage was dominated by stone scrapers and few backed tools. Scrapers were likely used for processing animal hides. Backed tools were created by blunting one margin of the stone tool at a near-90 degree angle. These backed tools were likely hafted to projectiles and served as barbs. Archaeologists have used the assemblage at the Wilton rock shelter to define other Wilton-like assemblages throughout South Africa, Zambia, and Zimbabwe.

=== Evolution of Wilton as a technological industry ===
In 1929, Goodwin and Van Riet Lowe initially used Wilton as a term to describe Microlith archaeological assemblages that contained small stone scrapers and backed tools. During this early period of excavation, Goodwin and Van Riet Lowe broke up Wilton technology into two variations defined by the interior and coastal geography of South Africa. The technological industry they associate with interior sites was termed Smithfield, leaving Wilton to define coastal foragers. Forager communities that used Smithfield technology were thought to be contemporaneous with Wilton but contained much larger stone technologies. During the mid-1900s, archaeologists began recovering more Wilton-like objects from other locations in South Africa, Zimbabwe, and Zambia. The stone technology in each of these regions reflects similar characteristics of Wilton technology but each contained slight variations in the technology, likely reflecting local differences due to the variation between environments. For instance, the site of Gwisho in Zambia had predominantly more backed tools than scrapers, contradicting what was originally found at the Wilton rock shelter. Backed tools soon became a significant component of Wilton assemblages. Building on the increased frequency of Wilton sites, Deacon used radiocarbon dates and backed tool frequencies to show that Smithfield could not be contemporaneous with Wilton and thus, must be the preceding technological industry, now termed Oakhurst.

Today, Wilton technology covers much of the same geographical scale as the preceding industry, Oakhurst. Wilton was originally associated with the archaeological assemblage from Wilton farm, which included a high number of scrapers, though archaeological assemblages elsewhere showed additional evidence for backed technology. So, today, Wilton technology is associated with an increase in formal tools like scrapers and backed pieces as well as a significant reduction in size. Wilton technology represents an increase in homogeneity across much of South Africa, including some sites in Zambia and Zimbabwe. This pattern of standard, Wilton, tool kits breaks down after 4,000 years, entering into the final late Stone Age. Evidence for the introduction of ceramics, pastoralism, and ironworking post-dating 4,000 years ago has created a mosaic of final late Stone Age technological industries in Southern Africa. This mosaic of industries makes it difficult to make regional generalizations of technological industries like Wilton. So, the term Wilton is now limited from 8,000 to 4,000 years.

== Technology ==
Archaeologists associate Wilton assemblages with an assortment of different types of stone and non-stone technology. Stone materials are one of the longest-lasting artifacts and, as such, allow archaeologists to interpret the behaviors of past peoples. In rare instances, it is possible for archaeologists to recover non-stone technology, hereafter referred to as biological material. Biological materials like wooden shafts of spears or digging sticks give insight into the broader cultural pattern of past foraging communities that is usually only represented via stone materials. For the Wilton archaeological record, archaeologists have access to a wide variety of stone tools and cases where biological tools were recovered, allowing Wilton to be defined by not only stone but also non-stone technology.

=== Stone technology ===
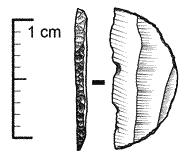
Microlith segment that shows the typical geometric shape and the effect of backing on one margin.

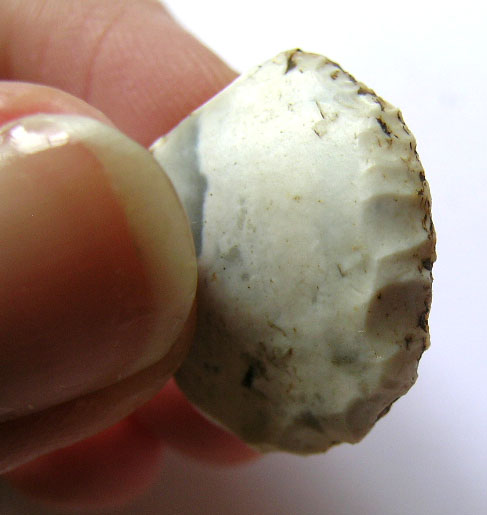
Image of a scraper. In some contexts, this artifact is referred to as a thumbnail scraper.

Initially derived from the Wilton rock shelter in South Africa, Janette Deacon classified the Wilton assemblages into four phases that mark the beginning of Wilton (stage 0), a growth phase (stage 1), a mature phase (stage 2), and a decline phase (stage 3). Janette Deacon recognizes a pre-ancestral stone industry at Wilton rock shelter dating to 10,000 years ago by the presence of large stone scrapers made from Quartzite materials. Furthermore, these stone materials are associated with large fauna, suggesting pre-ancestral peoples foraged large animals. These large stone tools are attributable to what Goodwin and Lowe would term Smithfield, a contemporaneous but distinct culture from Wilton. At 8,000 years ago, scrapers at the Wilton site become much smaller, and very few tool types are represented at this time. Deacon claims that this forms the basis for a growth phase (stage 1) of Wilton, which turns towards a mature phase (stage 2) dating to around 4,800 years ago. Stage 2 is represented by the smallest variation in scraper size and shape as well as a faunal assemblage dominated by small animals, distinguishing the Wilton from its predecessor. Additionally, this period is correlated with an increase in backed tool manufacture at Wilton. Though Deacon does not bring attention to this increase, backed tools become a prevalent factor in Wilton assemblages with sites like Gwisho. Then, around 2,270 years ago, the stone scrapers at Wilton become more variable, and formal tools decrease, suggesting a decline phase (stage 3). Stage 3 at the Wilton site is also correlated with the occurrence of pottery. Deacon suggests that "The correlation between the appearance of pottery and the 'death' of the Wilton cultural system is perhaps significant." These observations at Wilton rock shelter formed the basis for how Wilton assemblages are colloquially recognized, but soon, archaeologists realized that Wilton assemblages do vary in technology depending on where they are located.

Where Goodwin and Lowe originally define Smithfield, now known as Oakhurst, as the interior cultural equivalent to Wilton, Deacon showed that Wilton is constrained to the middle-Holocene (~8,000-4,000 years ago) and excludes assemblages identified as Oakhurst. Specifically, the main difference between Oakhurst and Wilton is a decrease in tool size and an increase in formal tools. Moreover, Deacon showed that there is a correlation between Wilton assemblages and an increasing quantity of formal tools like small segments, backed tools, and scrapers. These stone implements are similar to previous stone technologies that show up in several archaeological assemblages dating back to the Howiesons Poort (~70,000 years ago). Stone segments are often geometric in shape forming crescents that are then backed. The process of backing involves repeated percussion against one edge of a stone tool at a nearly 90-degree angle. Archaeologists associate these backed tools and segments as inserts that would have been hafted to form spear-like weapons. Some archaeologists argue that the reoccurrence of standardized stone segments and backed tools reflect a similar adaptation to environmental stress including increasing populations and deteriorating climate.

In Zambia, the stone technology from Luano Spring contains similar components to South African Wilton assemblages. Zambian Wilton technology is defined from the Mumbwa site, which shares similar technologies to South African Wilton and dates to the same later Stone Age period (8,000-4,000 years ago). Stone technology from Luano Spring consists of mostly quartz materials and, like South Africa, reflects a shift towards decreased size and emphasis on formal tools. However, this site is unique because of the frequency of Denticulate tools. The prominence of these types of tools likely reflects regional adaptations to different environments and access to raw materials like quartz. Due to this variation, some have termed these assemblages in Zambia as Nachikufan. Others have further noted that not all Nachikufan assemblages in Zambia reflect a similar Wilton-like appearance and thus, question their role in the later Stone Age industries. The distinction between Wilton and Nachikufan is defined by the absence of large scrapers, which had defined the previous Oakhurst technologies.

Similar sites in Zambia like that of Gwisho contained both inorganic (stone) and organic tools. Stone technology at Gwisho was similarly made on quartz raw materials. The stone flakes from Gwisho were irregular and accompanied by Wilton-like formal tools such as small scrapers and backed tools, but this site also contained denticulate tools, though not as many as was recovered from Luano Spring. A comparison between Gwisho and Mumbwa shows that Gwisho varied by the frequency of heavy stone tools (defined as tools used for woodworking ) and Burins, showing local variations in Zambia assemblages. However, like South Africa, the similarity in decreased stone technology, emphasis on small scrapers, and backed tools suggests Wilton technology in Zambia appears homogenous across space during the later Stone Age.

=== Non-stone technology ===
Archaeological sites in Zimbabwe and Zambia provide evidence of worked bone and wooden implements, providing an insight into the organic tools associated with Wilton technology. Specifically, the site of Pomongwe in Zimbabwe as well as Gwisho and Amadzimba cave in Zambia provide an assortment of bone and wooden technologies. Pomongwe cave in Zimbabwe has preserved several wooden and bone tools dating around 2,000 years ago and assigned as a Wilton assemblage. Two large and four small wooden projectile points and an element shaped like a hook were recovered from Pomongwe in association with notched bone shards, which are likely the result of scraping motions. Cook suggests that the wooden tools may have been used as digging sticks to acquire food resources, whereas the hook-shaped element may have been used as an animal trap. There was one cylindrical bone element that was hollowed out and may have been used as a flute or smoking pipe. Together, these biological tools allow archaeologists to infer the hunting and social behaviors of foragers associated with Wilton technologies. Furthermore, Cook contrasts the similarity of these biological tools with those found in South Africa and Zambia, arguing that Wilton technologies are similarly designed across southern Africa.

Gwisho hot springs in Zambia are broken up into three discrete sites, Gwisho A, B, and C. The Gwisho sites in Zambia contain several crushed bone and elephant ivory that was likely used for bone marrow as well as evidence for use-wear, suggesting these objects fall under the category of technology. Examples of bone tools found at Gwisho include points, awls, and needles. These types of tools were also encountered at the Amadzimba Cave in Southern Rhodesia, though Fagan and Van Noten argue that the bone technology at Gwisho is not as advanced as those recovered from Southern Rhodesia. Other sites in Zambia like Mumbwa have not yielded any evidence for bone tools. This variation could be the result of clear differences in technologies that foragers used at these sites, or taphonomic biases. That is, since biological materials rarely survive in the archaeological record, sites that lack evidence of biological tools may simply reflect instances with poor preservation, instead of technological changes.

Wooden fragments found at Gwisho are another form of technological strategy that implies the importance of wood-as-tools at these sites. Many wooden tools at Gwisho Springs are fragmented and unidentifiable, but each one shows signs of chopping, smoothing, and cutting, implying the intentional working of these wooden implements. Fagan and Von Noten identify several types of wooden tools at the Gwisho sites that include Pointed implements, digging sticks, club-shaped objects, and an array of smoothed fragments. They interpret the implements as evidence for pestles, knives, arrow shafts, and armaments. Similar types of wooden fragments were recovered from the Pomongwe site in Zimbabwe. Since these wooden tools are associated with Wilton-like stone technology, this relationship provides evidence of the importance that biological tools played in communities that made Wilton-like stone tools. Biological tools do not preserve in every archaeological context and thus, provide one explanation for why other sites associated with Wilton do not exhibit evidence of biological tools.

== Cultural behavior ==
Archaeologists like Goodwin and Lowe first used the term Wilton to describe a distinct stone tool assemblage with the implication that these assemblages were associated with unique cultural behaviors of foraging communities. Though some archaeologists show that Wilton sites dating between 8,000 and 4,000 years ago share similar stone and non-stone technology, contrasts between sites like Gwisho Spring, Pomongwe, Mumbwa, Wilton rock shelter, and Rose Cottage Cave show variability in the tools that foragers used during the middle Holocene. Changes in frequency and types of tools present reflects the variability at each of these sites. These changes might be a result of different environmental adaptations, however, Wilton-like assemblages still reflect homogeneous shifts from large to small tools and thus, may suggest a changes in behavioral adaptation that may include different diets, social networks, and population changes.

=== Diet ===
Archaeologists use a variety of methods to understand the past diets of forager communities including the presence of faunal remains and isotope data. Diets of many Wilton sites have been interpreted through the presence of faunal material, while few sites along the Southern coast of South Africa interpret diets through isotopic data. Wilton sites located in the cape of South Africa are generally associated with the collection of small animals, differentiating the preceding phase in which Oakhurst assemblages are correlated with large animals. Plant use also appeared to increase during Wilton occupations until 2,000 years ago.

These trends of plant and animal use are also reflected in the South African interior at sites like Rose Cottage Cave. At this inland site, an analysis of the stone tools shows that plant processing was a common task that foragers practiced. Preserved starch grains suggest that people at Rose Cottage Cave likely harvested underground plants including bulbs and tubers. Specific animals that were consumed at this site include antelope, vlei rat, warthog, and springbok among many more species.

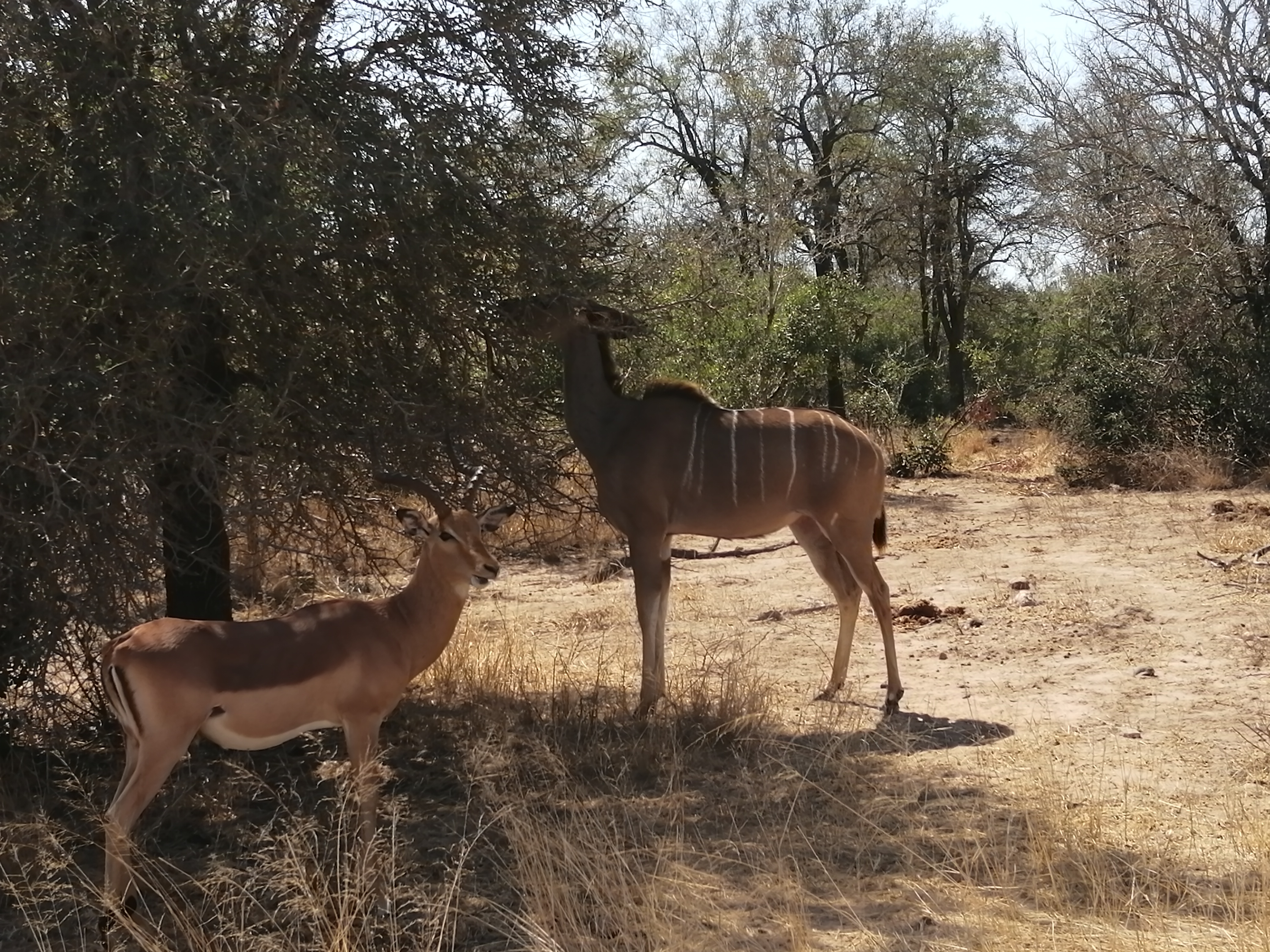
An antelope (left) and, for a size comparison, deer (right) browsing in Africa.

Northern Wilton assemblages also contain evidence for increased hunting of small game and heavy plant processing. In the Lunsemfwa basin, along the Lunsemfwa River in Zambia, the most dominant species present are bovids. Among the list of bovids represented here, past peoples consumed zebra, tortoise, aardvark, and small browsing antelope. In this region of Zambia, these fauna represent a similar environment that exists in Zambia today. Musonda and Gutin similarly show that the presence of fauna at the Mufulwe rock shelter in Zambia suggests periods of increased aridity that would have forced foraging communities to seasonally migrate between different sites on the landscape. This contrasts South African interior sites where the environment was less stable, yet both sites show similar animal and plant use patterns among the inhabitants.

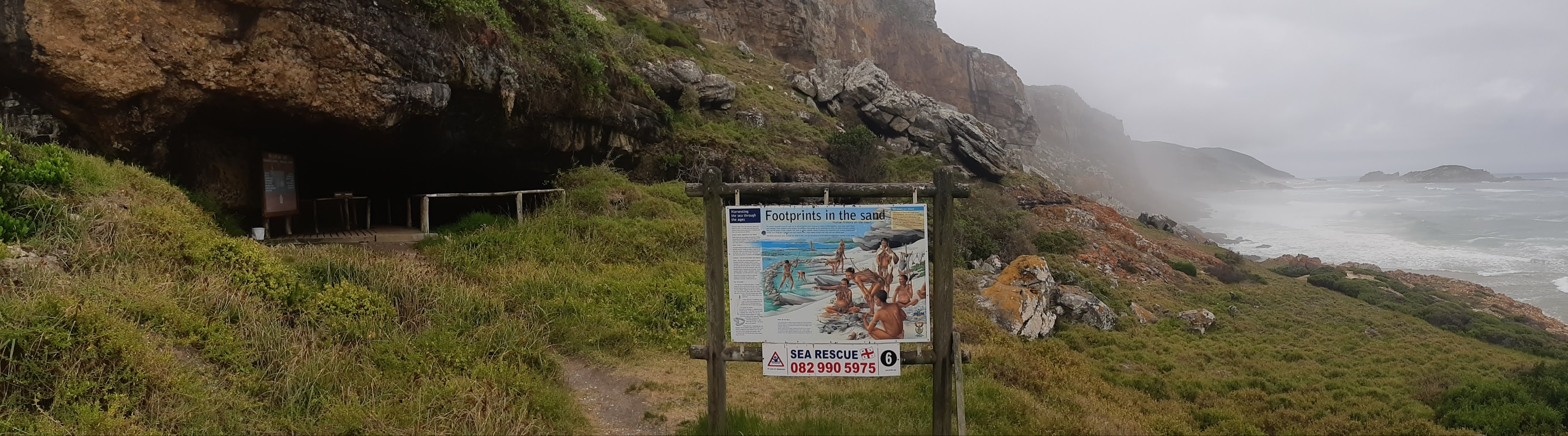
Entrance to Nelson Bay Cave showing the vicinity to the ocean.

Even along the southern coast of South Africa, despite the vicinity to the ocean, the faunal assemblages reflect terrestrial hunting strategies but with a slight increase in marine resources. Sites like Nelson Bay Cave show continued dependence on small game animals from 9,000 to 5,000 years ago. However, after 5,000 years ago diets at Nelson Bay Cave and other coastal sites reflect an increased dependence on marine resources. At Nelson bay cave 3,300 years ago, marine resources like fish and seals became a staple food source for these people. The site of Matjes River, which lies 14 km along the shore from Nelson Bay Cave shows a similar trend away from terrestrial foods but, instead of foraging marine resources, isotopic and archaeological data suggest the inhabitants of Matjes River had a mixed diet. This mixed diet included terrestrial bovids with an increased emphasis on the collection marine of foods like shellfish. Contrasting these two examples, skeletal remains from the inland site of Witcher's Cave show an exclusive terrestrial diet. So, it is clear that, where other Wilton sites in South Africa and Zambia show a continued dependence on small bovids and plant processing through the middle Holocene, forager communities in the southernmost portion of South Africa along coastal environments reflect a variety of behaviors that diverge from the classic Wilton generalization after 4,000 years ago.

=== Material exchange ===
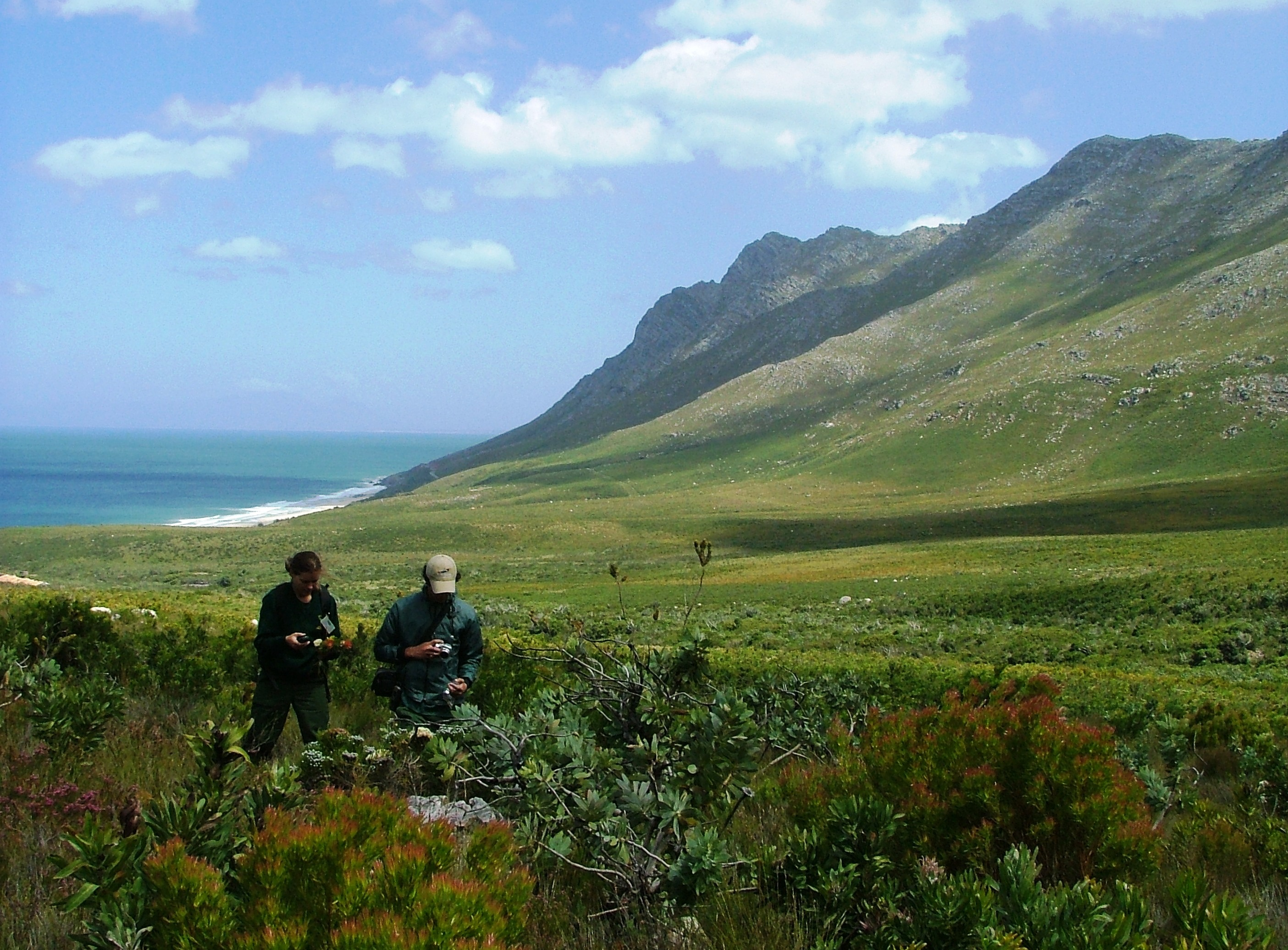
Image of the coastal region (Cape Town, South Africa) with a fynbos dominated environment.

Since archaeologists recognize Wilton as a shared system of cultural behaviors, there is an implied relationship Wilton communities have with one another that span from southernmost South Africa to Zambia. However, archaeological evidence suggest inter-regional and intra-regional variation. For instance, the way in which past peoples made arrowheads and backed stone tools, suggests different methods of production and thus, limited communication between foraging communities associated with Wilton technology. Inter-regional variability can be seen between the Wilton rock shelter and sites like Zambia. At Wilton, there are few backed tools, something that, today, defines Wilton assemblages but in contrast, sites in Zambia exhibit a high number of backed tools. In contrast, some archaeologists suggest that the reduction in stone tool size is a practice that spread through large social networks. However, there is much more variety in the types of non-tool stone material remains including the use of shell beads and ochre. Shell beads are interpreted as materials that can be traded and represent group identities on the landscape. On the other hand, ocher has functional uses such as ultraviolet protection and mastic for binding stone tools to spear-like weaponry, however, many scholars have also argued that ochre was used to symbolize group identities like shell beads. Ochre was also recovered from burials that date to Wilton period, suggesting ceremonial importance for ochre. Though stone technology may have been exchanged on the southern African landscape, the presence of non-tool stone materials during the mid-Holocene does suggest a diverse array of behaviors.

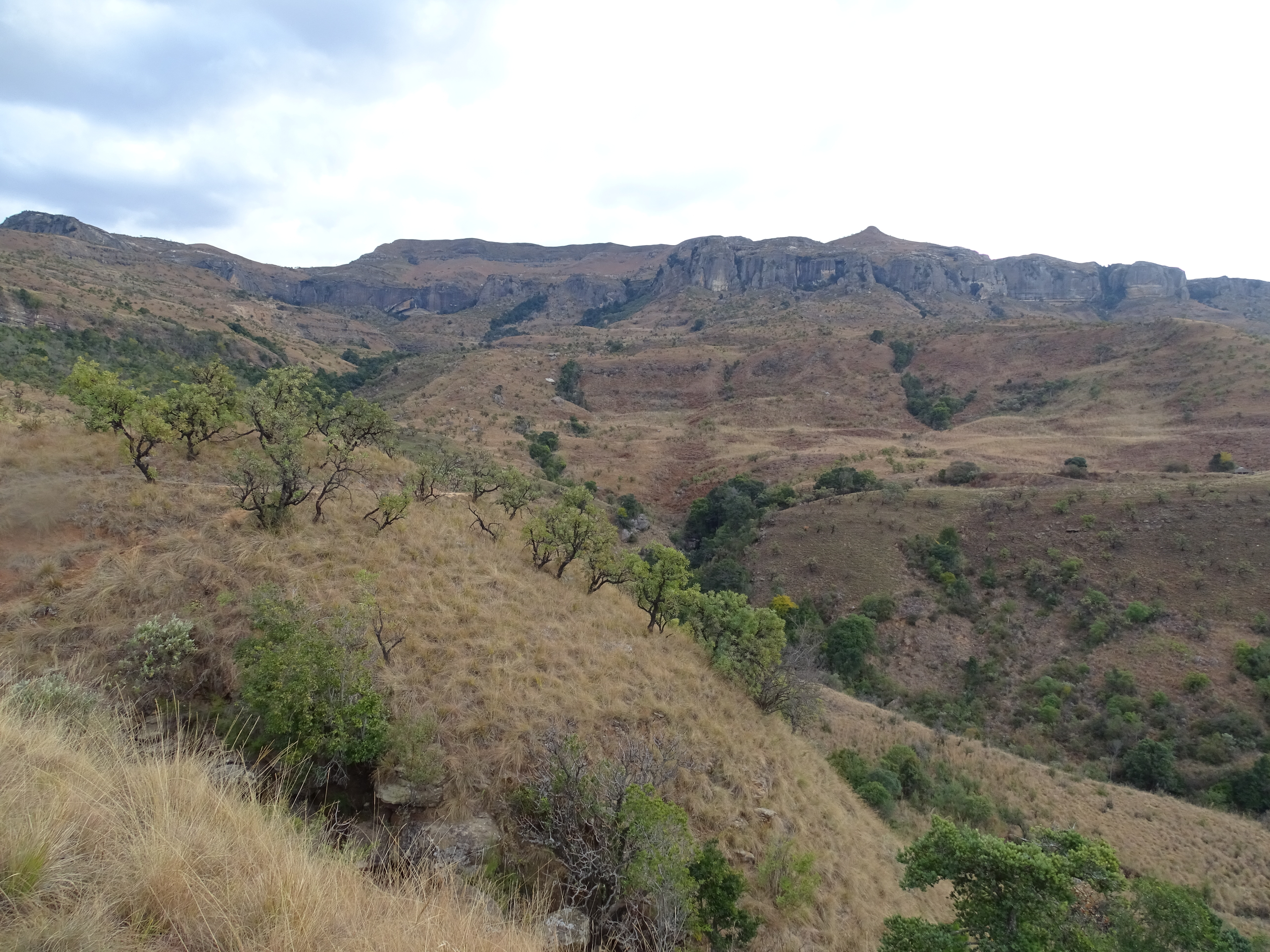
Image of Drakensberg Mountains, South Africa.

Among inter-regional variations in technology, there exist intra-regional burial practices primarily located along coastal environments that vary widely in the material culture that accompanies burials. Hall and Binneman show increased emphasis in burial practices and material production from two South African sites, Klasies River Caves and Welgeluk Shelter. These authors show an increase in shell bead production that accompanies burials and suggest that this reflects a stressed environment and increased emphasis on group identity. These authors posit that such environments may drive increased social exchange between forager communities and further suggest this may indicate semi-permanent settlements. However, differences in shell materials and non-stone technology between Nelson Bay Cave and Matjes River, in South Africa, suggest limited material exchange. In this latter case, archaeologists interpret, not an increase in exchange networks, but evidence for exclusive behaviors associated with territorial defense.

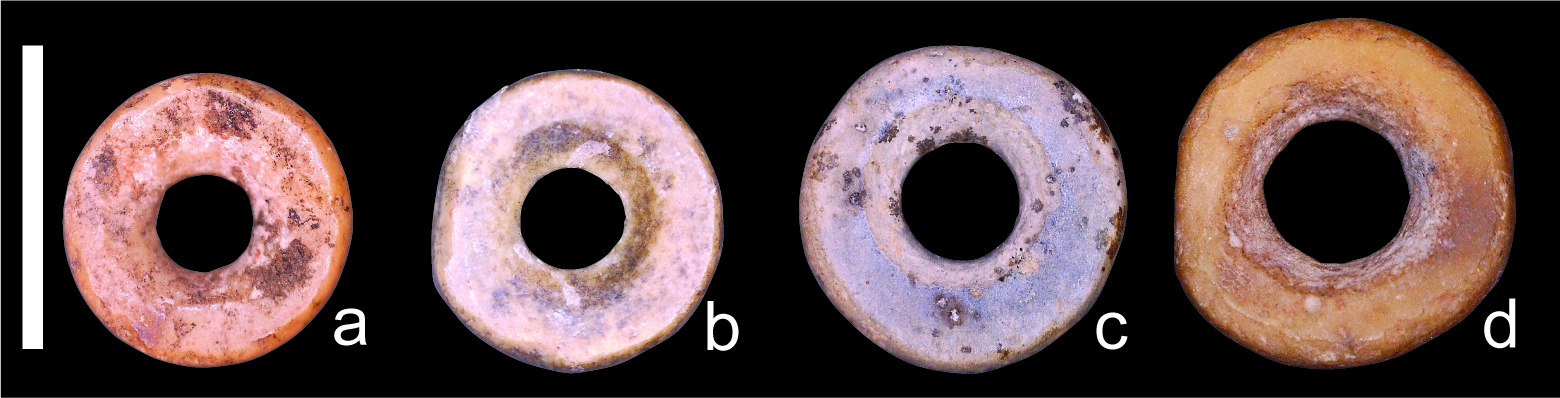
Ostrich eggshell beads showing size differences. Scale bar = 5 mm; (a) Nelson Bay Cave, South Africa; (b) Wonderwerk Cave, South Africa; (c) Magubike Rockshelter, Tanzania; (d) Daumboy 3 Rockshelter, Tanzania

To exemplify regional differences in Wilton communities, more recent studies of the Drakensberg montane region show large networks of forager communities. Stewart and colleagues use isotopes of strontium to show that ostrich eggshells traveled hundreds of kilometers into this region 8,000 years ago. This pattern contrasts that seen along the coastal regions where foragers are grounding themselves to specific parts of the landscape of South Africa, suggesting regional differences in mobility and potential for material exchange. For 50,000 years, forager communities in Africa have used ostrich eggshell beads. Archaeologists believe that the increase in bead production links prehistoric cultures to an increased need to symbolize group identities. The extensive movement of shells inland and the symbolic potential of these objects suggests highly mobile groups of people during the first period of time that we see Wilton-like technology (8,000 years ago). These networks once used to span from East to South Africa but appear to be disconnected after the Last Glacial Maximum. For instance, the stylistic design of eggshell beads remained similar between southern and eastern Africa until 33,000 years ago, forming an inter-regional network of foraging communities. By 19,000 years ago, the design of these beads varied, and by the middle Holocene, eastern and southern African communities appeared separated from one another. The spatial extent of social exchange was likely limited by prehistoric networks. The isolation of southern Africa may reflect the reason why Wilton-like technologies only extend as far north as Zimbabwe.

Lastly, the use of Ochre during this period has been interpreted as both, a symbolic and functional material. Ochre is a mineral pigment that past foraging communities have used since the Middle Stone Age for burials, symbolism, and hafting stone tools. During the Holocene, there is an increased use of ochre with evidence that ochre was heavily used in burials and hafting stone technology. Given that Wilton technology is associated with an increase in backed tools, it is likely that ochre was used for hafting these implements to create weapons. However, sites in southern Namaqualand, South Africa, exhibit an absence of preserved ochre on the backed tools in Holocene assemblages. This absence may suggest that ochre was used for other functional purposes during the Holocene and not exclusively for hafting stone tools. An additional use of ochre may be as an insect repellent and protection of UV light. By contrast, ochre may have been used as a social adaptation. For instance, the symbolic use of ochre could be related to signaling group identity and artistic expressions in the form of rock art. Most middle Holocene assemblages spanning from the coastal regions to inland montane environments do contain evidence that ochre was heavily used. However, the vast majority of archaeological assemblages in South Africa do not provide adequate context to directly observe the use of ochre as symbolic material. Archaeologists use ethnographic data to interpret how prehistoric populations may have used ochre and to infer the magnitude of its cultural significance.

=== Demographics ===
One implication of small, standard, stone tools that Wilton represents is related to the movement of peoples through southern Africa and hence, the interaction of different forager populations. Goodwin and Lowe initially considered Wilton to be a culture that migrated into South Africa from a more northern region, but Deacon showed that Wilton was likely an adopted feature of already existing technologies and was not an effect of a pioneering culture. Building on this hypothesis, Judith Sealy posits that Wilton technology was developed under low populations that occurred due to increased aridity throughout much of South Africa during the middle Holocene.

Current hypotheses suggest that the size of human populations is directly linked to changes in climate and hence, result in technological changes. Environmental data shows favorable climate and increased site density from 12,000 to 8,000 years ago, corresponding to Oakhurst technology, which consists of large, informal tools. Favorable climate fosters highly productive ecosystems and thus, adequate amount of resources to support large group sizes. Climate and demographics during this time implies large forager populations. However, during the middle Holocene, temperatures increased, forming arid regions that became unsuitable for forager populations in South Africa. Archaeological sites in South Africa show a discontinuous spatial distribution of Wilton technology and thus, suggests sparse populations. The use and emphasis on small, formal, stools from 8,000 to 4,000 years ago can be explained as a strategy for coping with poor environmental conditions. Yet, the uniform transition from large to small tools may suggest that there were extended networks between foraging communities in South Africa that extended north into portions of Zambia and Zimbabwe. This evidence provides support that ameliorated climate and sparse, but well-connected, foraging populations may be a component to the development of Wilton technology.

== Significance to modern African communities ==
Khoisan, sometimes just referred to as San, is the name for the Indigenous communities of South Africa and to many archaeologists, represents direct cultural descendants from later Stone Age foragers. At an early account for the site of Mumbwa in Zambia, Protsch argued that Khoisan peoples emerged in central Africa around 20,000 years ago. Other accounts by d'Errico and colleagues use evidence from Border Cave to suggest a much earlier emergence of Khoisan communities dating to 40,000 years ago. These case studies argue that the stone and non-stone tools of early foraging communities in central and southern Africa reflect similar tools used by Khoisan today, but other archaeologists argue on the basis of scientific inference that the similarity of technology does not imply cultural continuity over 40,000 years. These contrasting views reflect two main components of the Kalahari debate in which the question of cultural continuity between late Stone Age peoples and modern Indigenous communities comes under scrutiny. On one end, the cultural identities of African communities represent a direct link to prehistoric populations and can help to describe prehistoric behaviors. On the other end of this debate, cultural contact and transformation have been ongoing for thousands of years and so, modern communities do not reflect the exact cultural behaviors or identities of prehistoric populations.

During the Holocene, the question becomes whether Wilton technology reflects the foundation for modern Indigenous communities in South Africa today. Wilton is the last colloquially recognized technological industry before the final late Stone Age that post-dates 4,000 years. After 4,000 years ago, the technologies that foragers use become less standardized and more variable across Southern Africa. Increased variability in the types of tools people made may reflect human choices to specialize to specific environments and may signal a disconnect from exchange networks that some posit existed from 8,000 to 4,000 years. At 2,000 years ago, pastoral communities entered South Africa from northern regions and began to interact with foraging communities. Contact between foraging and pastoral communities likely impacted the types of tools present and cultural behaviors. Some scholars show that not all foraging communities conformed to pastoral lifeways, but, instead, adapted to the presence of pastoralists by specializing in tools designed for a new economy. A change in economy after 2,000 years may not have changed cultural practices of foragers during this time, but the introduction of this economy did change the kinds of stone technology. Therefore, this brings up an issue with connecting present and past cultural identities based solely on technology.

During European contact, other scholars posit that this interaction created a kind of Creolization. Creolization refers to the expression of new cultural traits as an effect of the contact between two unique cultures. Evidence for creolization in the historic past raises questions about whether cultural identities remained intact up until the present day. If cultural identities are intact, then archaeologists can use modern Indigenous communities to interpret Holocene behaviors, but the creolization may suggest a shift in cultural behaviors. This raises an additional question about what the difference between stone tools and cultural behaviors. In the instance where foragers in South Africa increased the production of stone scrapers as a result of changing economies with pastoral communities, does this reflect a change in cultural behavior or material production? Furthermore, since tools may be driven by changes in the economy and not necessarily cultural behaviors, this makes it difficult to argue that cultural identities are directly linked to stone technology. This brings us back to the concerns that stone industries like Wilton overgeneralize cultural behaviors and may not accurately reflect groups identities across southern Africa.
