= Robberg Nature Reserve and Marine Protected Area =

Conservation area at the Robberg peninsula in South Africa

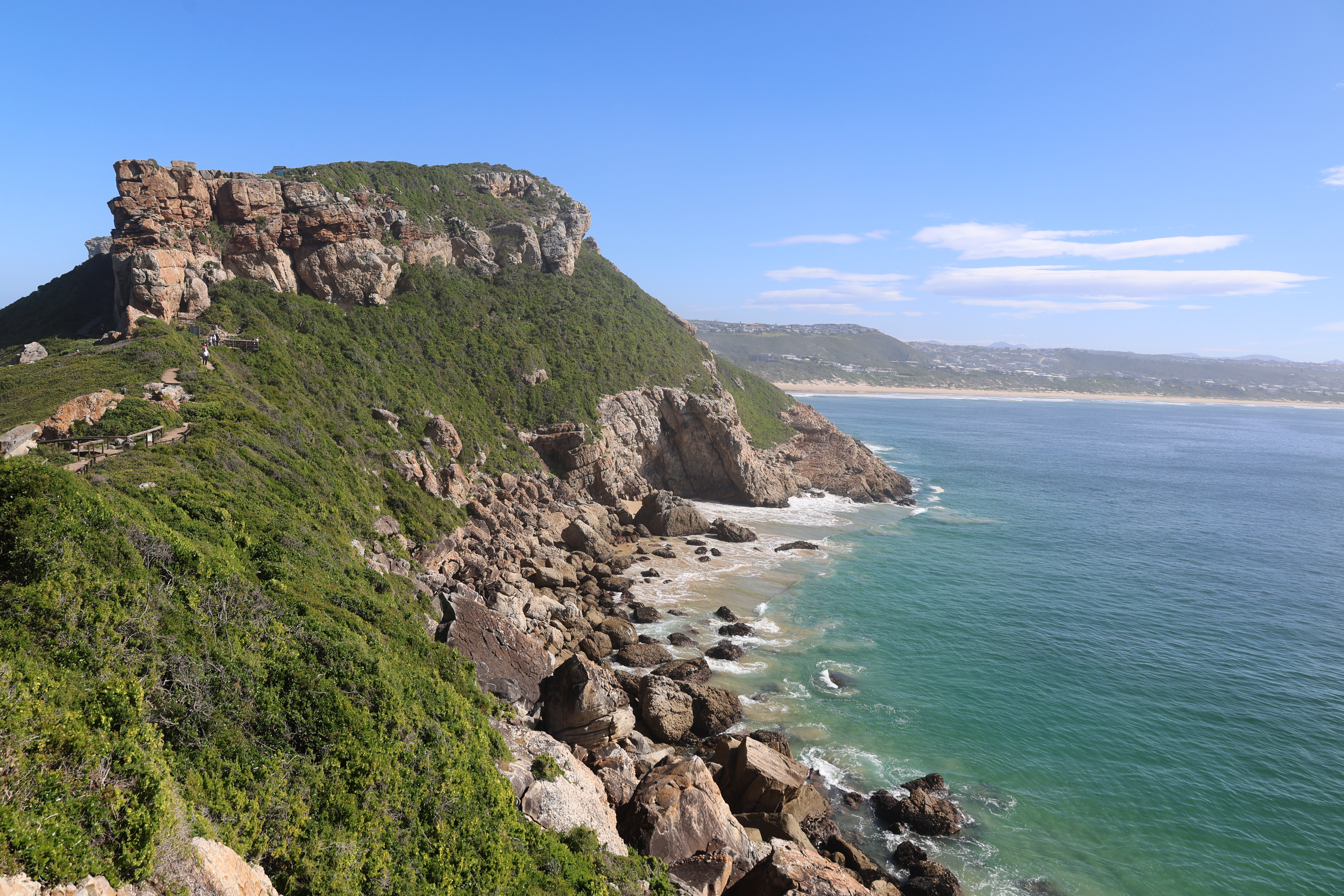
- Robberg Nature Reserve and MPA location
- Location: Robberg Peninsula, South Africa
- Nearest city: Plettenberg Bay
- Coordinates: 34°6.275′S 23°24.134′E
- Area: 42 km^{2} (16 sq mi)
- Established: Nature reserve - 1980; Marine protected area - 1998
- Governing body: CapeNature
- Website: capenature.co.za/reserves/robberg-nature-reserve/
- Robberg Nature Reserve and Marine Protected Area (South Africa)

The Robberg Nature Reserve and Marine Protected Area is an inshore conservation region in the territorial waters of South Africa, near Plettenberg Bay in the Western Cape province.

== History ==
=== Robberg Nature Reserve ===
The 1.96 km^{2} Robberg Nature Reserve was established on 1 August 1980.

=== Robberg Marine Protected Area ===
The Robberg Marine Protected Area was established on 2 September 1998 as a Marine Protected Area by Proclamation in Government Notice No. 18 of 1998, and was proclaimed by the Minister of Environmental Affairs and Tourism, Mohammed Valli Moosa, in Government Gazette No. 21948 of 29 December 2000 according to section 43 of the Marine Living Resources Act, 18 of 1998.

== Purpose ==
A marine protected area is defined by the IUCN as "A clearly defined geographical space, recognised, dedicated and managed, through legal or other effective means, to achieve the long-term conservation of nature with associated ecosystem services and cultural values".

== Extent ==
About 12.9 km (8.0 mi) of coastline comprising 1.85 km (1.15 mi) of sandy shores along Robberg beach and 11.05 km (6.87 mi) on the Robberg peninsula, and 42 km^{2} (16 sq mi) of ocean is protected by the MPA.

=== Boundaries ===
The boundaries are:

- Northern boundary: 34°04.916′ E023°22.300′ to S34°04.916′ E023°25.967′
- Eastern boundary: S34°04.916′ E023°25.967′ to S34°07.633′ E023°25.967′
- Southern boundary: S34°07.633′ E023°25.967′ to S34°07.633′ E023°22.300′
- Western boundary: S34°07.633′ E023°22.300′ to 34°04.916′ E023°22.300′

=== Zonation ===
Marine ecoregions of the South African Exclusive Economic Zone: Robberg Marine Protected Area is in the Agulhas ecoregion.

The entire MPA is a controlled area.

== Management ==
The marine protected areas of South Africa are the responsibility of the national government, which has management agreements with a variety of MPA management authorities, in this case, CapeNature, which manages the MPA with funding from the South African Government through the Department of Environmental Affairs (DEA).

The Department of Agriculture, Forestry and Fisheries is responsible for issuing permits, quotas and law enforcement.

The MPA is in the warm temperate Agulhas ecoregion to the east of Cape Point which extends eastwards to the Mbashe River. There are a large proportion of species endemic to South Africa along this coastline.

Four major habitats exist in the sea in this region, distinguished by the nature of the substrate. The substrate, or base material, is important in that it provides a base to which an organism can anchor itself, which is vitally important for those organisms which need to stay in one particular kind of place. Rocky shores and reefs provide a firm fixed substrate for the attachment of plants and animals. Some of these may have kelp forests, which reduce the effect of waves and provide food and shelter for an extended range of organisms. Sandy beaches and bottoms are a relatively unstable substrate and cannot anchor kelp or many of the other benthic organisms. Finally there is open water, above the substrate and clear of the kelp forest, where the organisms must drift or swim. Mixed habitats are also frequently found, which are a combination of those mentioned above. There are no significant estuarine habitats in the MPA.

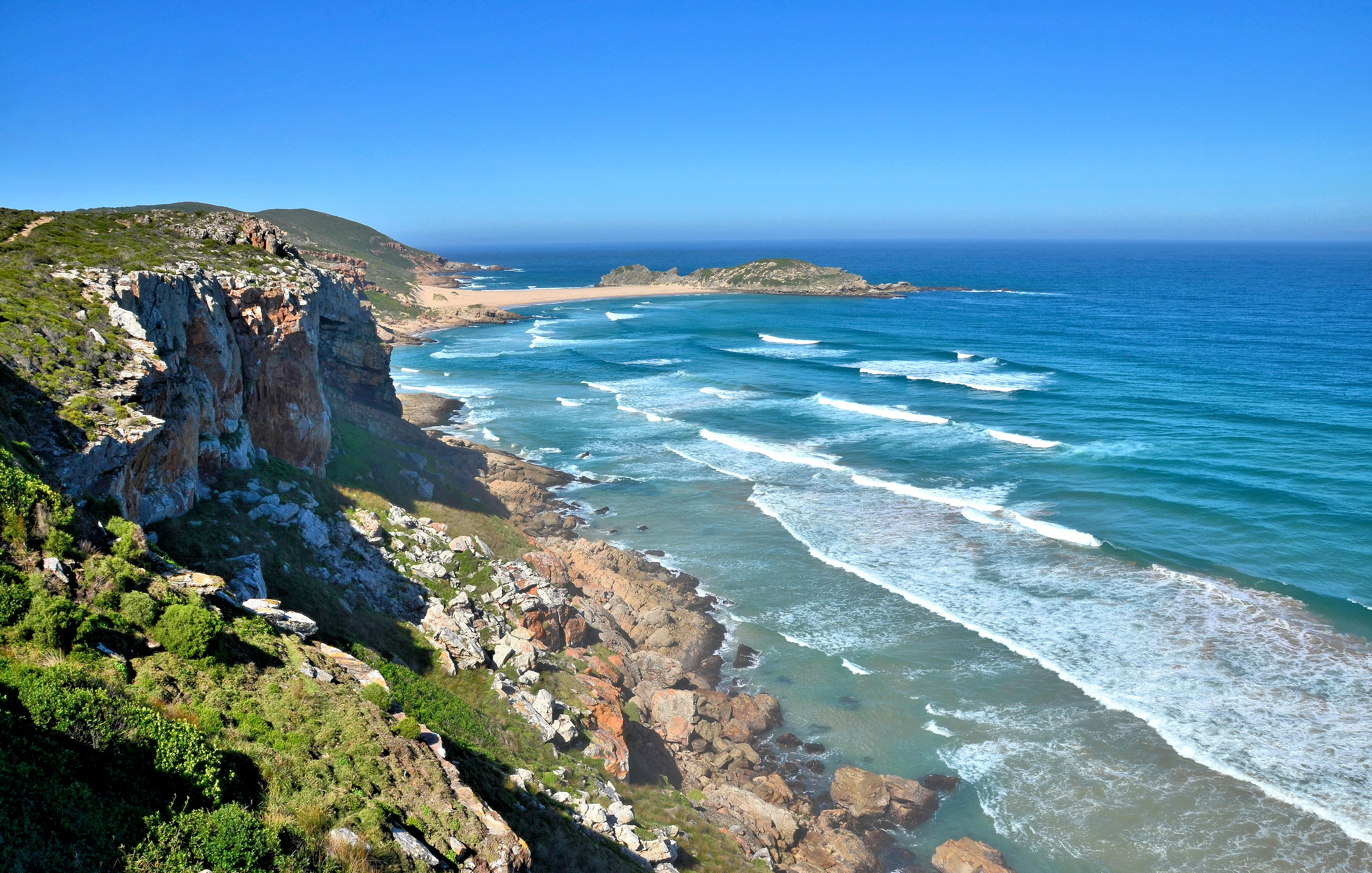

Rocky shores and reefs There are rocky reefs and mixed rocky and sandy bottoms. For many marine organisms the substrate is another type of marine organism, and it is common for several layers to co-exist. Examples of this are red bait pods, which are usually encrusted with sponges, ascidians, bryozoans, anemones, and gastropods, and abalone, which are usually covered by similar seaweeds to those found on the surrounding rocks, usually with a variety of other organisms living on the seaweeds.

The type of rock of the reef is of some importance, as it influences the range of possibilities for the local topography, which in turn influences the range of habitats provided, and therefore the diversity of inhabitants. Sandstone and other sedimentary rocks erode and weather very differently, and depending on the direction of dip and strike, and steepness of the dip, may produce reefs which are relatively flat to very high profile and full of small crevices. These features may be at varying angles to the shoreline and wave fronts. There are fewer large holes, tunnels and crevices in sandstone reefs, but often many deep but low near-horizontal crevices.

Sandy beaches and bottoms (including shelly, pebble and gravel bottoms) Sandy bottoms at first glance appear to be fairly barren areas, as they lack the stability to support many of the spectacular reef based species, and the variety of large organisms is relatively low. The sand is continually being moved around by wave action, to a greater or lesser degree depending on weather conditions and exposure of the area. This means that sessile organisms must be specifically adapted to areas of relatively loose substrate to thrive in them, and the variety of species found on a sandy or gravel bottom will depend on all these factors. Sandy bottoms have one important compensation for their instability, animals can burrow into the sand and move up and down within its layers, which can provide feeding opportunities and protection from predation. Other species can dig themselves holes in which to shelter, or may feed by filtering water drawn through the tunnel, or by extending body parts adapted to this function into the water above the sand.

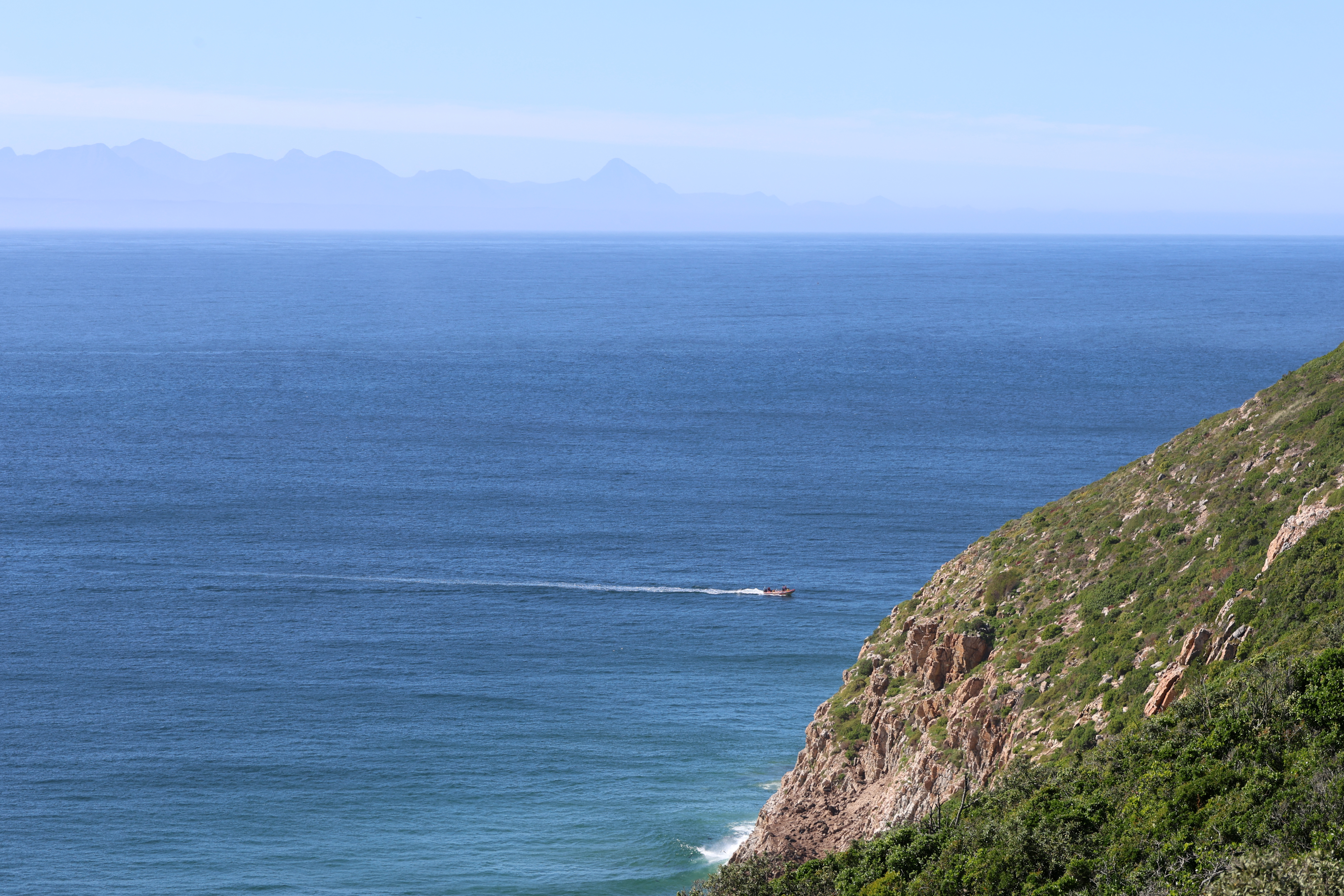

The open sea

The pelagic water column is the major part of the living space at sea. This is the water between the surface and the top of the benthic zone, where living organisms swim, float or drift, and the food chain starts with phytoplankton, the mostly microscopic photosynthetic organisms that convert the energy of sunlight into organic material which feeds nearly everything else, directly or indirectly. In temperate seas there are distinct seasonal cycles of phytoplankton growth, based on the available nutrients and the available sunlight. Either can be a limiting factor. Phytoplankton tend to thrive where there is plenty of light, and they themselves are a major factor in restricting light penetration to greater depths, so the photosynthetic zone tends to be shallower in areas of high productivity. Zooplankton feed on the phytoplankton, and are in turn eaten by larger animals. The larger pelagic animals are generally faster moving and more mobile, giving them the option of changing depth to feed or to avoid predation, and to move to other places in search of a better food supply.

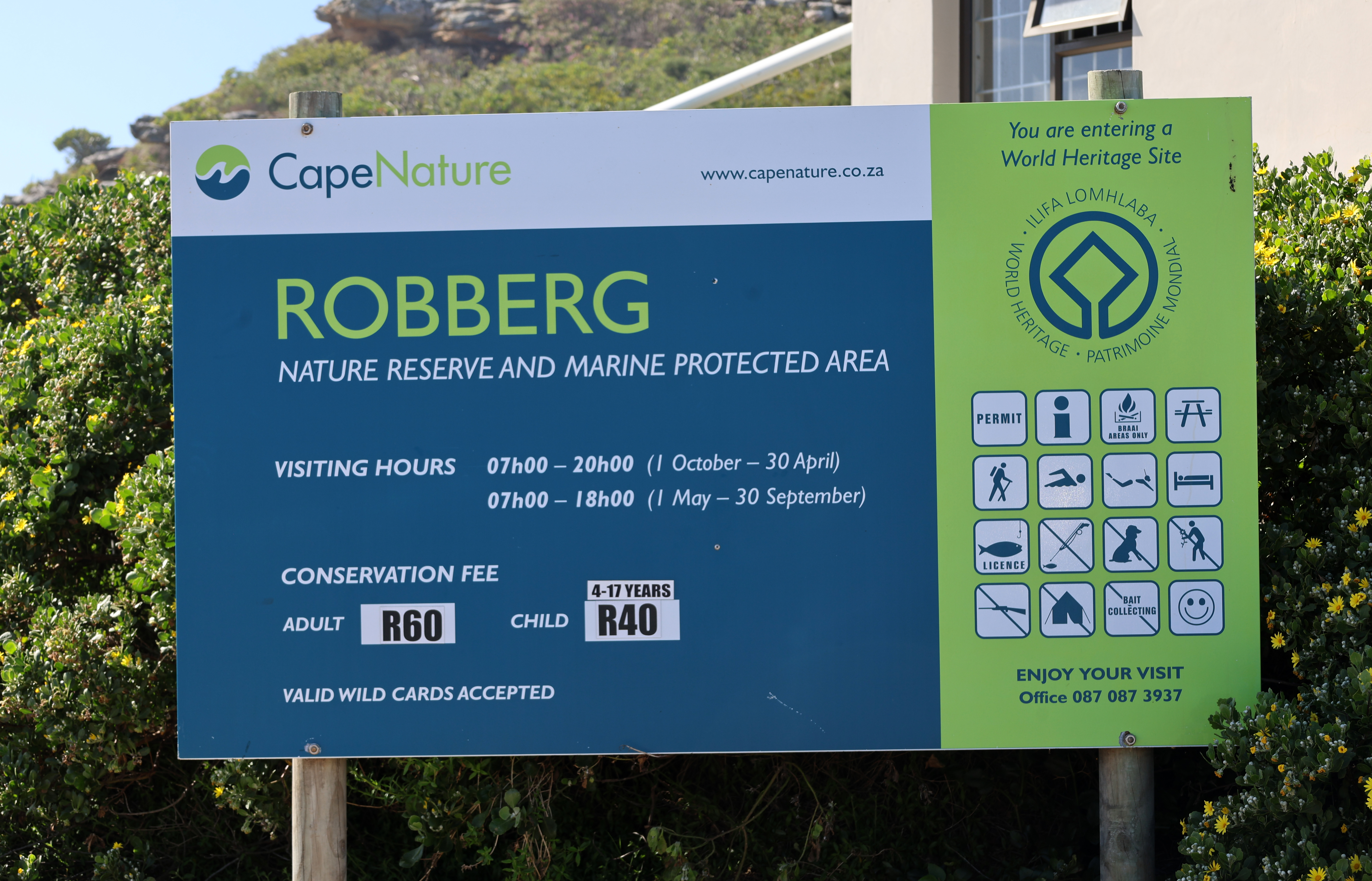
Robberg Nature Reserve and Marine Protected Area signboard

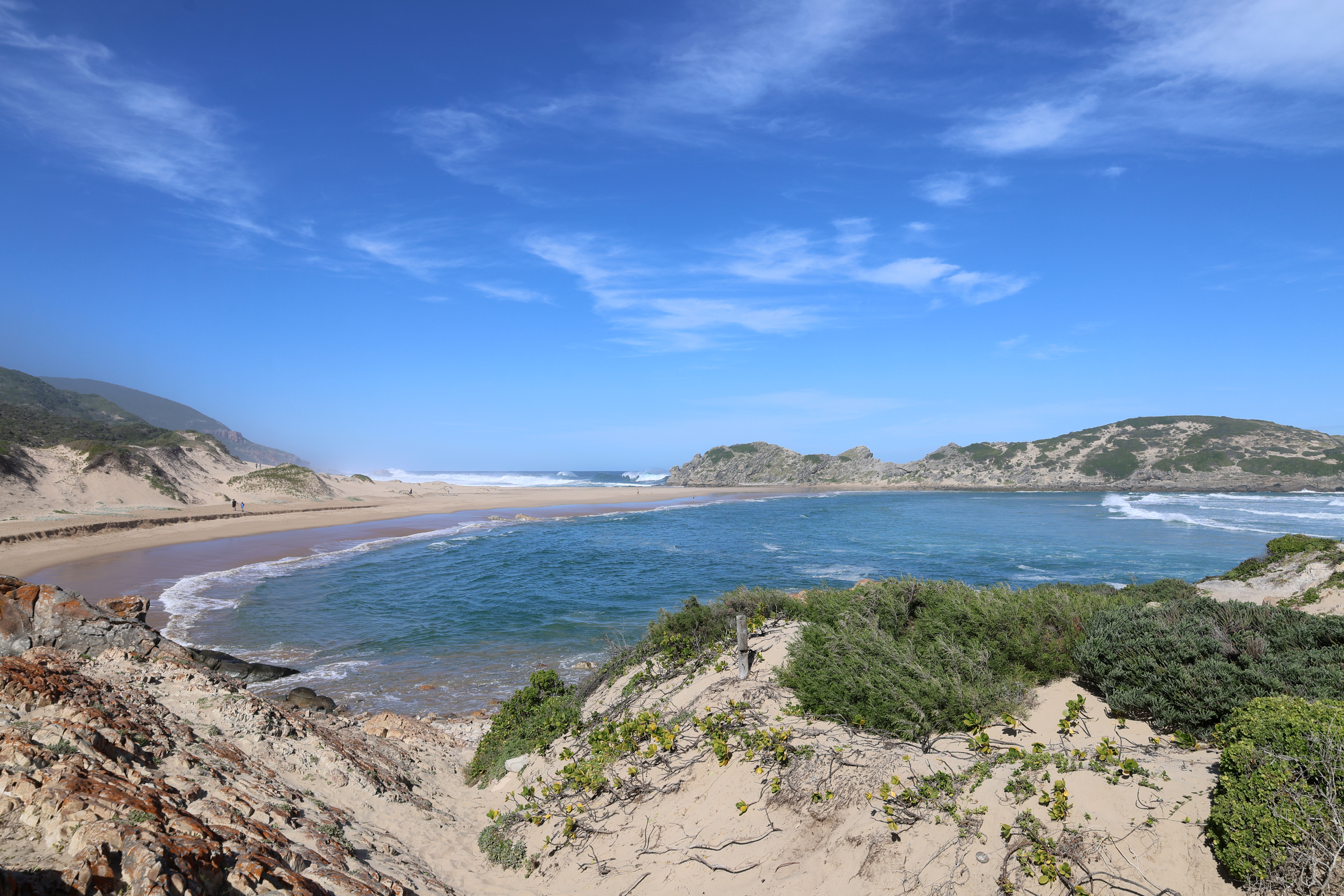
Robberg Peninsula from the south

=== Animals ===
Marine mammals:

Birds:

- Haematopus moquini (African oystercatcher) - breeding area
- Phalacrocorax lucidus (White-breasted cormorant) - breeding area

Marine reptiles:

- Caretta caretta (Loggerhead turtle) - annual visitors
- Chelonia mydas (Green turtle) - annual visitors
- Eretmochelys imbricata (Hawksbill turtle) - annual visitors
- Dermochelys coriacea (Leatherback turtle) - rare visitors

Fish:

- Cheimerius nufar (santer)
- Chrysoblephus laticeps (Roman seabream)
- Cymatoceps nasutus (poenskop)
- Dichistius capensis (galjoen)
- Diplodus sargus capensis (blacktail)
- Gymnocrotaphus curvidens (john brown)
- Lichia amia (garrick, leervis)
- Lithognathus lithognathus (white steenbras)
- Lithognathus mormyrus (sand steenbras)
- Mustelus mustelus (smoothhound shark)
- Mugilidae spp. (mullet)
- Pachymetopon blochii (hottentot)
- Pachymetopon grande (bronze bream)
- Pomatomus saltatrix (elf)
- Rhabdosargus holubi (cape stumpnose)
- Sarpa salpa (strepie)
- Seriola lalandi (yellowtail)
- Sphyrna zygaena (smooth hammerhead shark)

=== Endemism ===
The MPA is in the warm temperate Agulhas ecoregion to the east of Cape Point which extends eastwards to the Mbashe River. There are a large proportion of species endemic to South Africa along this coastline.

== See also ==
Marine protected areas of South Africa

Climate of South Africa

- List of protected areas of South Africa
- Marine protected areas of South Africa – Protected areas of coastline or ocean in the EEZ of South Africa
