= Verlorenvlei Heritage Settlement =

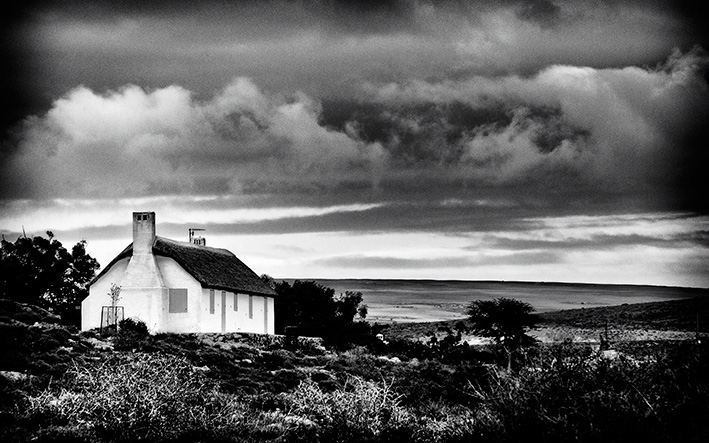

- Location within Western Cape
- Location: Verlorenvlei, Western Cape
- Coordinates: 32°19′44.47″S 18°22′21.37″E

Verlorenvlei Heritage Settlement is situated in the Piketberg District, South Africa. 32°19′ S 18° 23′ E. The settlement consists of surviving Langhius structures in what was once a thriving Hamlet on the shores of the Verlorenvlei. A remnant of this sort is unique and is the reason behind the site being declared a provincial heritage site.

== Heritage significance ==
The Langhius is situated on portions 18-36 of the Verlorenvlei Farm and is owned by the Verlorenvlei Heritage Settlement and Nature Reserve Home Owners Association. The Verlorenvlei has attracted the attention of researchers from a number of disciplines such as archaeology, botany, zoology, ecology, geology, architecture and ornithology. The Verlorenvlei settlement is regarded as a unique remnant of a particular way of life, with a distinctive architectural style which has developed from the first permanent buildings which were erected in the late 18th century. The wider area is associated with extremely significant archaeological sites like Elands Bay Cave which have contributed to a greater understanding of the development of the human species. This gives the area both pre-colonial and post-colonial heritage significance. Clanwillam which contains many rock art and rock engraving sites and the megamiddens found at Mussel Point.

== History of the site ==
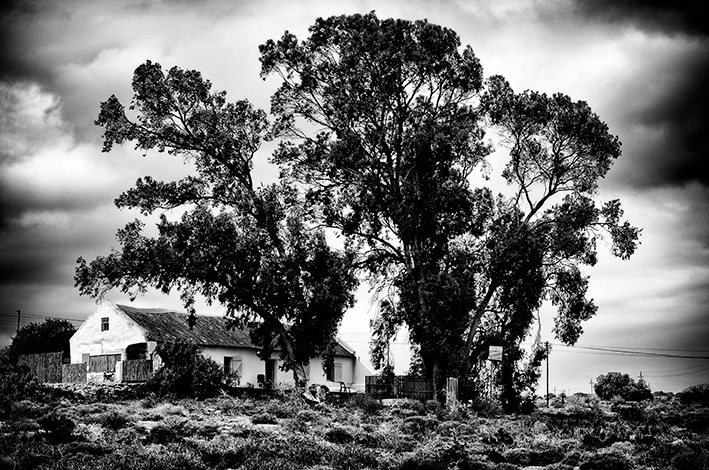
House at Verlorenvlei Heritage Dettlement, Elands Bay

The farm was a loan place since 1723 and was leased to a various farmers until the land was granted to Michiel Johannes de Beer in 1837 who later sold it to Theunis Erasmus Smits in 1883. In the 20th century various houses on the farm were occupied by Smits, Coetsees, Kotzes, Mosterts and others. The distinctive architectural style of the house developed at the mouth of the Verlorenvlei, it is considered to be different from what is known as a ‘classic’ Cape Farmhouse which is typically a thatched T or H house with a gable above the entrance. The first buildings in the area were built in the late 1770s, later a large Hamlet developed around them during the 19th century when there was boom in grain and fish production. Many smaller houses were built around the main large house by the extending family members to form a settlement. Very few of these houses have survived.

== Ramsar convention ==
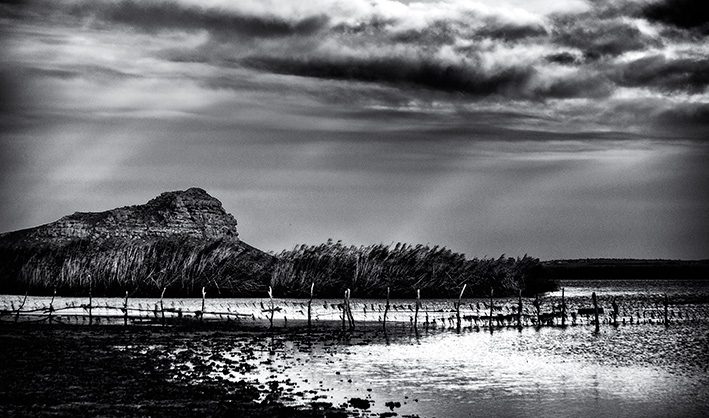
View across the vlei from the Heritage Settlement

The Verlorenvlei itself is a significant estuarine system in the Western Cape. The importance of the vlei has led to it being recognised as a wetland of international significance and was designated as a Ramsar site on the 28 June 1991

== Provincial heritage site ==
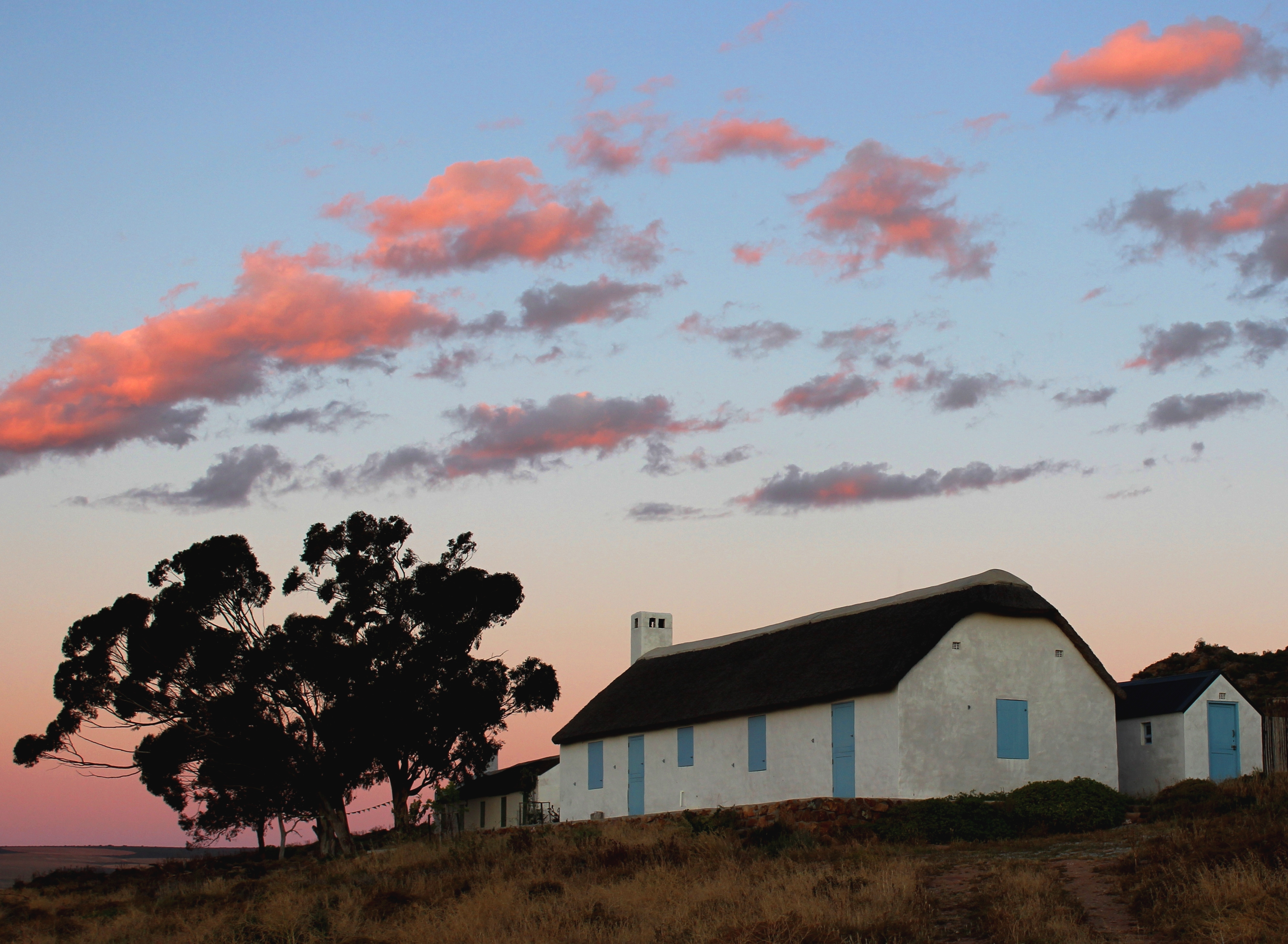
House at Verlorenvlei Heritage Settlement, Elands Bay

The Verlorenvlei Settlement was declared a provincial heritage site by the provincial heritage resources authority, Heritage Western Cape on the 23 September 2014 in terms of section 27 of the National Heritage Resources Act. The site is hence a Grade II heritage resource and is formally protected under South African heritage Law.
