= John Parkington =

South African archaeologist

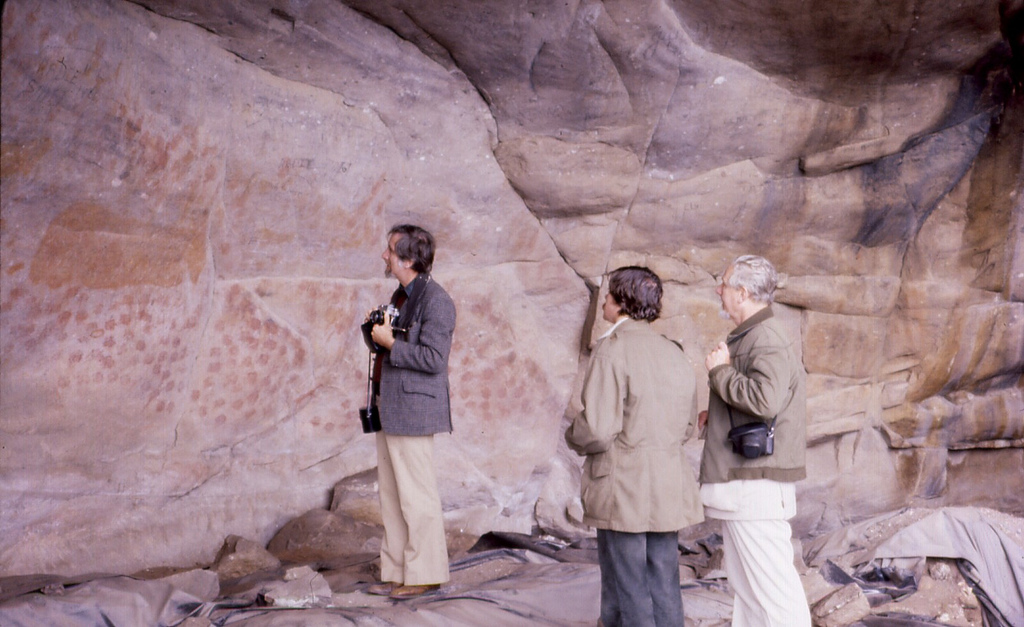
- Rock paintings at Eland's Bay Cave Photo taken in 1979. From left to right, Merrick Posnansky, John Parkington and J. Desmond Clark.
- Education: Cambridge University
- Known for: Hunter-gatherers; Paleoenvironmental reconstruction and Human ecology Prehistoric art Coastal archaeology
- Scientific career
- Fields: Archaeology
- Workplaces: University of Cape Town
- Thesis: Follow the San: an analysis of seasonality in the prehistory of the south western Cape (1977)
- Doctoral students: Hilary John Deacon; Janette Deacon
- Website: John Parkington at UCT

John Parkington FRSSAf is an emeritus professor in archaeology and hunter-gatherers, Paleoenvironmental reconstruction and human ecology, prehistoric art, and coastal archaeology. He has suggested that since fish provide an important nutrient for the brain, the consumption of fish led to the emergence of the first really intelligent humans in the Western Cape region of South Africa. In February 2000 South African President Thabo Mbeki mentioned the letter he had received from Parkington, regarding the protection of archaeological heritage sites, in his address at the opening of South Africa's Parliament.

== Career ==
Parkington received his education at Cambridge University where he completed a BA (Hons.) in Paleolithic Archaeology in 1966. In the same year he was appointed Junior Lecturer at the University of Cape Town (UCT) and promoted to Lecturer in 1971. He completed his MA at Cambridge in 1973 and was appointed associate professor of archaeology at UCT in 1976.

Parkington completed his PhD in Paleolithic Archaeology in 1977 with a thesis entitled: "Follow the San: an analysis of seasonality in the prehistory of the south western Cape" and was appointed Professor of Archaeology at UCT in 1986.

He has been a visiting professor at the Department of Anthropology at the University of California, Berkeley in semesters during 1983, 1984, 1985 and 1995. In 1988 he was visiting professor at the Department of Anthropology at Rutgers University and in 1996 at Institut du Quaternaire, University of Bordeaux, Talence, France.

== Recognition, memberships and awards ==
- Member of the Academy of Science of South Africa
- Fellow of the Royal Society of South Africa (1987)
- Fellow of the Society of Antiquaries of London (1986)
- Alan Pifer Award for outstanding welfare-related research from UCT (1999)

== Other projects ==
In 2002 Parkington started the Clanwilliam Living Landscape Project, a sustainable jobs initiative, in which local inhabitants of the area were trained to interpret rock art and act as tour guides.

== Books ==
- Bailey, G.; Parkington, J.; et al. (1988). The Archaeology of Prehistoric Coastlines. New Directions in Archaeology. Cambridge University Press. ISBN 978-0-521-25036-8.
- Parkington, J.; Morris, D.; et al. (2008). Karoo Rock Engravings: Marking Places in the Landscape. Follow the San. Living Landscape Project.
- Parkington, J.; Rusch, N. (2006). Shorelines, strandlopers and shell middens: archaeology of the Cape coast. Follow the San. Southern Cross Ventures. ISBN 9780620352321.
- Parkington, J.; Rusch, N. (2003). Cederberg rock paintings. Follow the San. Living Landscape Project. ISBN 978-0-620-31113-7.

== Selected publications ==
- Broadhurst, C. Leigh, et al. "Brain-specific lipids from marine, lacustrine, or terrestrial food resources: potential impact on early African Homo sapiens." Comparative Biochemistry and Physiology Part B: Biochemistry and Molecular Biology 131.4 (2002): 653–673.
- Klein, R. G., Avery, G., Cruz-Uribe, K., Halkett, D., Parkington, J. E., Steele, T., ... & Yates, R. (2004). The Ysterfontein 1 Middle Stone Age site, South Africa, and early human exploitation of coastal resources. Proceedings of the National Academy of Sciences of the United States of America, 101(16), 5708–5715.
- Parkington, John E. "Seasonal mobility in the late Stone Age." African Studies 31.4 (1972): 223–244.
- Parkington, John. "Coastal settlement between the mouths of the Berg and Olifants Rivers, Cape Province." The South African Archaeological Bulletin 31.123/124 (1976): 127–140.
- Parkington, John E. "Soaqua and Bushmen: hunters and robbers." Past and present in hunter-gatherer studies (1984): 151–174.

== See also ==
- Mussel Point, a large "prehistoric" shell midden near Elands Bay
- Diepkloof Rock Shelter
- Elands Bay Cave
