= Refilwe Moreetsi =

South African aviator

- Born: 1987 (age 38–39); Tzaneen, Limpopo, South Africa
- Citizenship: South Africa
- Education: Merensky High School; South African Air Force
- Alma mater: Stellenbosch University; Central Flying School, Langebaanweg; Starlight Aviation Group; Helicopter Flying School; The DaVinci Institute
- Occupation: Professional pilot
- Years active: Since 2006
- Known for: Aviation
- Title: Senior first officer at South African Airways

Refilwe Moreetsi is a South African airline transport pilot, who serves as a senior first officer at South African Airways (SAA), the national carrier airline of South Africa. Since June 2022, she concurrently serves as the Fatigue Risk Management Specialist (FRMS) at SAA, having served as Deputy FRMS before that. She was the first black female pilot to serve in those roles in the 90+-year history of the airline.

== Background and education ==
Moreetsi was born in the town of Tzaneen, in Mopani District Municipality, in Limpopo, South Africa, circa 1987. She is the youngest of four children.

She attended Merensky High School in Tzaneen. Following the attainment of a high school diploma, she turned down a full scholarship to study mining engineering at the University of Pretoria and an alternative to study aeronautical engineering at Wits. Instead she joined the South African Air Force (SAAF), to pursue aviation.

At the SAAF she was trained as a helicopter pilot. Later, she studied at Stellenbosch University, where she obtained a Higher Certificate in Military Studies followed by a Bachelor of Military Science in Aeronautics, Aviation, Aerospace Science and Technology. She attended the Central Flying School in Langebaanweg, Western Cape Province and undertook the Pupil Pilot Course.

In 2010, she attended Starlight Aviation Group and obtained a private pilot's license and attended Helicopter Flying School for more certification. In 2020, she graduated from the DaVinci Institute with a Bachelor of Commerce degree in Business Management, specializing in aviation management.

== Career ==
During her service in the Air Force, she qualified as a helicopter pilot. She went on to fly the Oryx Helicopter, the largest helicopter in the South African National Defence Force. In that capacity, she flew missions with SAAF in the Democratic Republic of the Congo, including humanitarian aid, flood relief, firefighting, peacekeeping and search and rescue missions. As the Atlas Oryx is also used to transport the president, deputy president and other VIPs, Moreetsi flew both Jacob Zuma and Cyril Ramaphosa.

In 2014, she left the Air Force and joined the South African Airways Group, starting as a first officer at the now defunct South African Express. In 2016 she transferred to SAA. The aircraft she is certified to fly include the Atlas Oryx helicopter, the CRJ 700, the Boeing 737 and the Airbus A320 aircraft classes.

On 25 October 2022, she co-piloted a Boeing 737 with Flight Captain Annabel Vundla on Flight SA346 from Johannesburg to Cape Town, the first time a SAA flight was operated by an all-black female cockpit crew, in the 90+-year history of the airline.

== Personal ==
First Flight Officer Refilwe Moreetsi is a married mother of two.
