= Hilary Deacon =

- Born: 10 January 1936
- Died: 25 May 2010 (aged 74); Stellenbosch, South Africa
- Education: University of Cape Town
- Spouse: Janette Deacon
- Scientific career
- Fields: Geology and Archaeology
- Workplaces: Stellenbosch University
- Thesis: An archaeological study of the Eastern Cape in the post-pleistocene period (1974)
- Doctoral advisor: John Parkington

Hilary John Deacon (10 January 1936 – 25 May 2010) was a South African archaeologist and academic. He was professor of archaeology at the Stellenbosch University in Stellenbosch, South Africa. His research focused on the emergence of modern humans and African archaeology. He was principal researcher at the Klasies River Caves, one of the oldest known sites of anatomically modern humans, who lived there circa 125,000 years ago.

== Early life and education ==
Hilary Deacon was born in Cape Town and did his undergraduate studies in geology and archaeology at the University of Cape Town, graduating in 1955. He then worked as an exploration geologist in Tanzania, Kenya, Ghana and the United Kingdom for six years. He returned to UCT to do an honours degree in archaeology under Ray Inskeep in 1962. Here he met the archaeologist, Janette Buckland, whom he married in 1962.

== Career ==
He was appointed archaeologist and later became deputy director of the Albany Museum in Grahamstown where he worked from 1963 to 1971. He was the recipient of a British Council Scholarship in 1967 that enabled him to attend University College, London, where he was able to gain experience in the preparation of pollen samples, charcoal and other organic material from archaeological sites. He then established the Department of Archaeology at the Stellenbosch University, until his retirement in 1999. He received his PhD from the University of Cape Town in 1974. He was a visiting professor at University of California, Berkeley (1986), a visiting fellow at Australian National University, Canberra (1984) and a visiting professor at the University of Chicago (1978).

His research centred around the emergence of modern humans and multidisciplinary African archaeology. He was the principal researcher at the well-known sites of Scott's Cave, Amanzi, Howiesons Poort, Wilton, Melkhoutboom, Highlands, Boomplaas and Matjes River, and latterly at Klasies River, one of the oldest known cave sites with well-preserved anatomically modern human remains dating from circa 115,000 years ago. Deacon taught archaeology at the Stellenbosch University and wrote over a hundred publications in journals, books, monographs, and conference proceedings. He served on the council of the university and was past-president of the South African Archaeological Society, the Southern African Association of Archaeologists, the South African Society for Quaternary Research, and a member of the Board of Iziko Museums in Cape Town.

== Personal life ==
Deacon was married to Janette Deacon, who also taught archaeology at Stellenbosch University.

== See also ==
- List of fossil sites (with link directory)
- List of hominina (hominid) fossils (with images)
- Late Stone Age
