= Paternoster Midden =

Archaeological site in South Africa

- Location within Western Cape
- Location: Elands Bay, Western Cape
- Coordinates: 32°48′16.6104″S 17°54′2.4156″E

Paternoster Midden is a megamidden on the west coast of South Africa. This megamidden has particular value, as it is one of the few megamiddens in existence that has such a rich and diverse faunal and artefactual content.

== Significance ==
Most of the shell middens along the west coast of the Western Cape are small in size, and their content consists mainly of large amounts of marine shells and only very modest amounts of fauna vertebrae and artefactual remains such as ostrich eggshell beads.

Several middens have been found at Paternoster. One of these midden sites is known as PNNA, and is now referred to as "Paternoster Midden". This is a megamidden, with a unique content compared to other middens on the same coast. Paternoster Midden is a large site, 350 metres (1,150 ft) long and 150 metres (490 ft) wide. It contains a large percentage of faunal remains made up of small animals such as tortoises, marine birds, snakes, and Cape fur seals, as well as small and large bovids, such as steenbok, grysbok, eland, buffalo and even an extra-large bovid with elephant remains. The megamidden also contains cultural items which are rarely found in middens; ostrich eggshell beads (OES) are among the most notable of these finds. Other cultural items found were stone artefacts and unworked OES fragments that are likely to be the remnants of food or water containers.

== Provincial heritage site ==
Paternoster Midden was declared a provincial heritage site by Heritage Western Cape on 9 April 2009, in terms of Section 27 of the National Heritage Resources Act. This gives the site Grade II status, and provides the site with protection under South African heritage law.

Mussel Point is another megamidden that has recently been declared a provincial heritage site.
