= Janette Deacon =

South African archaeologist

- Born: 25 November 1939 (age 86); Cape Town, South Africa
- Education: University of Cape Town
- Spouse: Hilary John Deacon
- Children: 3
- Awards: Honorary Doctorate from University of Cape Town
- Scientific career
- Fields: Archaeology, rock art management
- Workplaces: formerly at National Monuments Council, now South African Heritage Resources Agency, Honorary Professor of Archaeology at the University of South Africa, Honorary Research Associate at the Rock Art Research Institute, University of the Witwatersrand
- Thesis: The Later Stone Age in the southern Cape, South Africa. (1982)
- Doctoral advisor: John Parkington

Janette Deacon (née Buckland, born 25 November 1939) is a South African archaeologist specialising in heritage management and rock art conservation. She has studied the changes in stone tools from sites in the southern Cape in relation to climate change over the past 20,000 years. From 1985, she located rock engravings at places where the /Xam informants of Wilhelm Bleek and Lucy Lloyd lived in the nineteenth century. She served as a member of the SAHRA Council and was first chairperson of Heritage Western Cape.

== Early life and education ==
Born Janette Buckland, on 25 November 1939 in Cape Town, she attended the Rustenburg School for Girls in Cape Town before graduating from the University of Cape Town (UCT) in 1960 with a BA, followed by a MA in 1969 and a PhD in 1982 in which she analysed later Stone Age assemblages from Nelson Bay Cave, Boomplaas Cave and Kangkara shelter.

== Career ==
After her BA graduation she worked as W.J. Talbot's research assistant in the Geography Department at UCT and lectured in the Archaeology Department in 1962 and from 1972 to 1975. From 1976 to 1988 she was a research assistant in the Department of Archaeology at Stellenbosch University. Deacon was the editor of the South African Archaeological Bulletin from 1976 to 1993. She has been Honorary Secretary of the South African Archaeological Society since 1997. In 1989 she was appointed as Archaeologist at the National Monuments Council (NMC), until she retired in 1999. During this time she represented the NMC at the Arts and Culture Task Group and the writing team for the National Heritage Resources Act No 25 of 1999.

After her retirement she became the first chairperson for Heritage Western Cape (HWC) in 2002 serving until 2007. As secretary for the Southern African Rock Art Project, she arranged courses and workshops for the nomination of rock art sites on the World Heritage List. From 1995 to 2011 this programme was further developed as a Getty Conservation Institute field project.

In 2016, she was awarded an honorary doctorate in literature from UCT for her contributions to archaeology and rock art research.

== Select awards ==
- 2016: Awarded an honorary doctorate in literature from the University of Cape Town
- 2013: Western Cape Heritage Award for rock art management
- 2010: UNESCO medal for rock art international archive, commemorating 60th anniversary of UNESCO and the World Heritage Convention (1972)
- 2008: Association of Southern African Professional Archaeologists Life Membership award and medal
- 2004: Western Cape Arts, Culture and Heritage Award (Archaeology)
- 1996: South African Archaeological Society President’s Medal

== Personal life ==
Deacon was married to Hilary Deacon, who also taught archaeology at the University of Stellenbosch, until his death in 2010. They have three children.
