= Heritage Western Cape =

Western Cape heritage resources authority

- Abbreviation: HWC
- Predecessor: National Monuments Council
- Formation: 25 October 2002; 23 years ago
- Type: Provincial heritage resources authority
- Legal status: Public entity
- Headquarters: 3rd Floor, Protea Assurance Building, Green Market Square, Cape Town
- Coordinates: 33°55′23″S 18°25′13″E
- Region served: Western Cape, South Africa
- Services: Heritage resources management
- Chairperson: Reyhana Gani
- CEO: Michael Janse van Rensburg
- Main organ: Council
- Parent organization: Western Cape Government's Department of Cultural Affairs and Sport
- Budget: R2.1 million (2025)
- Revenue: R2.2 million ((2025))
- Expenses: R1.7 million ((2025))
- Funding: Western Cape Government
- Website: www.hwc.org.za

Heritage Western Cape (HWC) is a provincial heritage resources authority established by the Minister of Cultural Affairs and Sport of the government of the Western Cape province in South Africa. It is a public entity set up under the terms of the National Heritage Resources Act.

It is mandated to care for that part of South Africa's national estate that is of provincial and local significance in the Western Cape. It may delegate responsibility for heritage resources of local significance to competent municipal governments.

Heritage Western Cape is best known as the custodian of approximately 2,500 provincial heritage sites, but is also responsible for administration of other forms of protection of heritage established under the terms of the National Heritage Resources Act.

== History ==
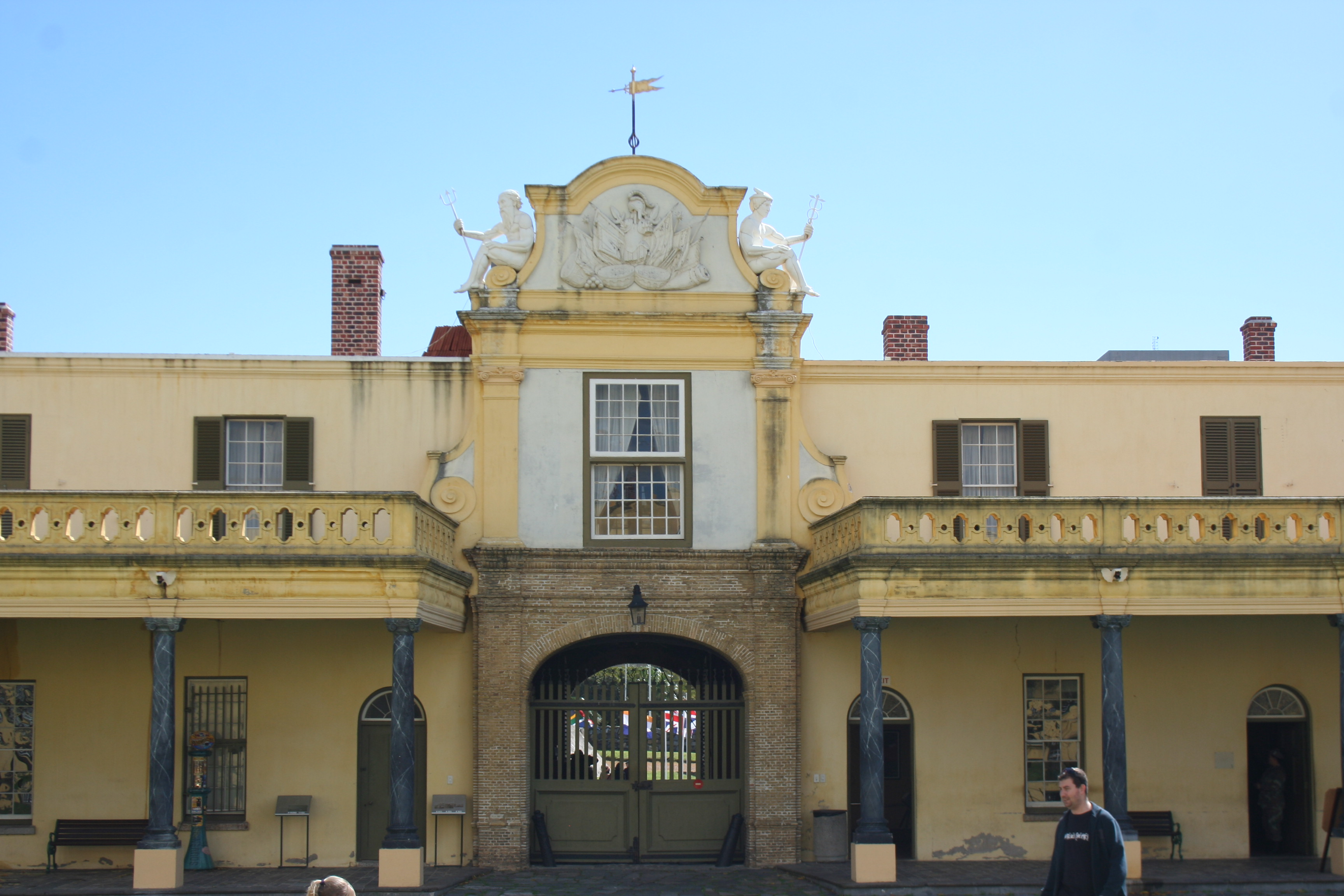
Exit gate of the Castle of Good Hope provincial heritage site, Cape Town. The first site in South Africa to be formally protected by heritage law

Heritage Western Cape is the successor body to the former National Monuments Council in the Western Cape. Under the 1996 Constitution of South Africa, cultural matters are a competency shared between national and provincial government. This necessitated the creation of a system whereby many of the responsibilities of the former National Monuments Council were devolved to provincial level via the National Heritage Resources Act.

Whilst provinces may pass their own heritage conservation legislation, the Government of the Western Cape chose to use provisions of the National Heritage Resources Act which allow it to establish a provincial heritage resources authority (PHRA). Heritage Western Cape was hence established by regulation on 25 October 2002. In 2003 a Council was appointed by the province's Minister for Cultural Affairs and Sport and has since met on a quarterly basis.

The council has established a number of sub-committees which meet regularly to carry out the legal responsibilities of the organisation. For the most part this concerns the processing of almost 3 300 applications per annum for work on sites protected under the terms of the National Heritage Resources Act.

Heritage Western Cape inherited responsibility for approximately 2,500 former national monuments, now known as "provincial heritage sites". The National Heritage Resources Act provides for a greater variety of protection than did its predecessor and the organisation has continued to institute protections of various forms under its terms. A large part of this work is dedicated to transforming the heritage landscape of the Western Cape to ensure that the heritage of all its people enjoys equal recognition and appropriate protection.

The logo of the organisation was launched by the provincial Minister for Cultural Affairs and Sport on 13 May 2006.

== SAHRA and HWC's mandate ==
Heritage Western Cape is subject to a biennial assessment of competency by the South African Heritage Resources Agency (SAHRA) in terms of which it is determined which aspects of the National Heritage Resources Act it is qualified to implement. It has been assessed as competent to deal with all areas over which a provincial heritage resources authority is permitted to act, aside from Section 36 of the Act which covers certain aspects relating to graves and burials.

To clarify areas of uncertainty regarding mandate, representatives of Heritage Western Cape meet quarterly with SAHRA. Following a court case that created uncertainty regarding responsibility for sites that have been recognised as Grade I by SAHRA, but which have not yet been declared as national heritage sites, a memorandum of understanding has been concluded which allows Heritage Western Cape to deal with all such matters unless they concern archaeological sites and graves protected under Sections 35 and 36 of the National Heritage Resources Act.

== Categories of heritage resources under HWC ==
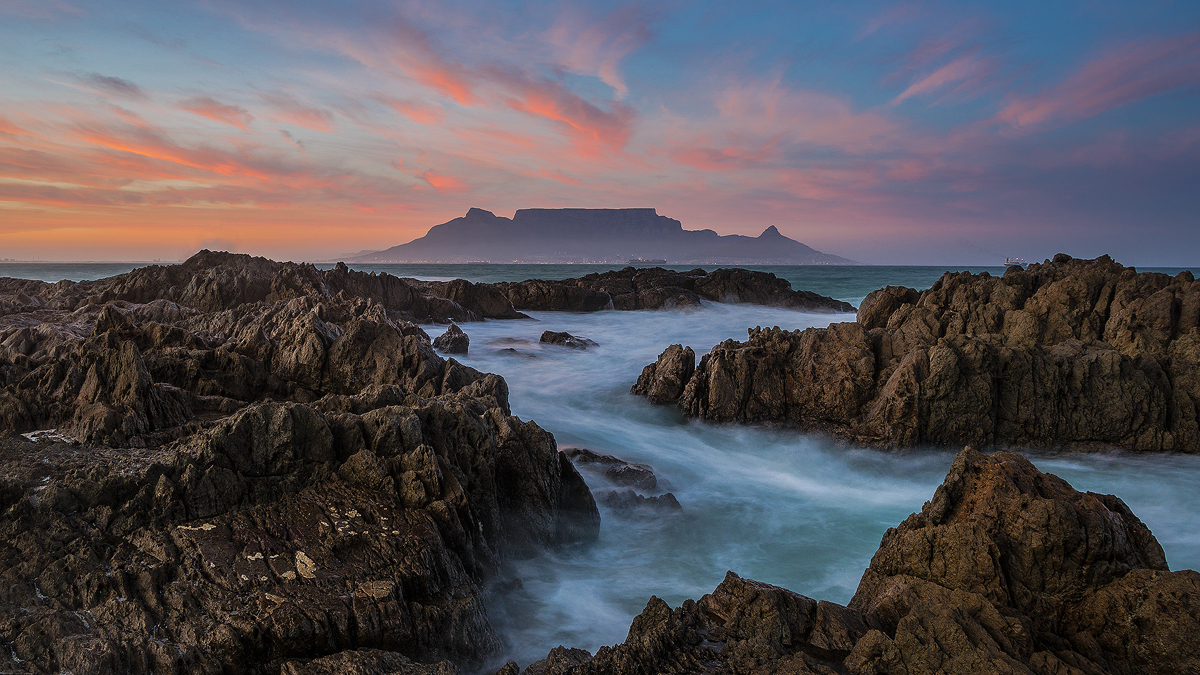
Table Mountain provincial heritage site, Cape Town

Heritage Western Cape is responsible for sites that fall within the following categories:

- Buildings and structures of architectural, historical, technical and aesthetic value
- Places to which oral traditions or intangible values are attached
- Historical settlements and towns
- Landscapes and natural features
- Geological sites
- Archaeological sites
- Palaeontological sites
- Rock art sites
- Battlefields
- Graves and burial grounds
- Sites associated with slavery
- Living heritage (Intangible cultural heritage)

== Council and committees ==
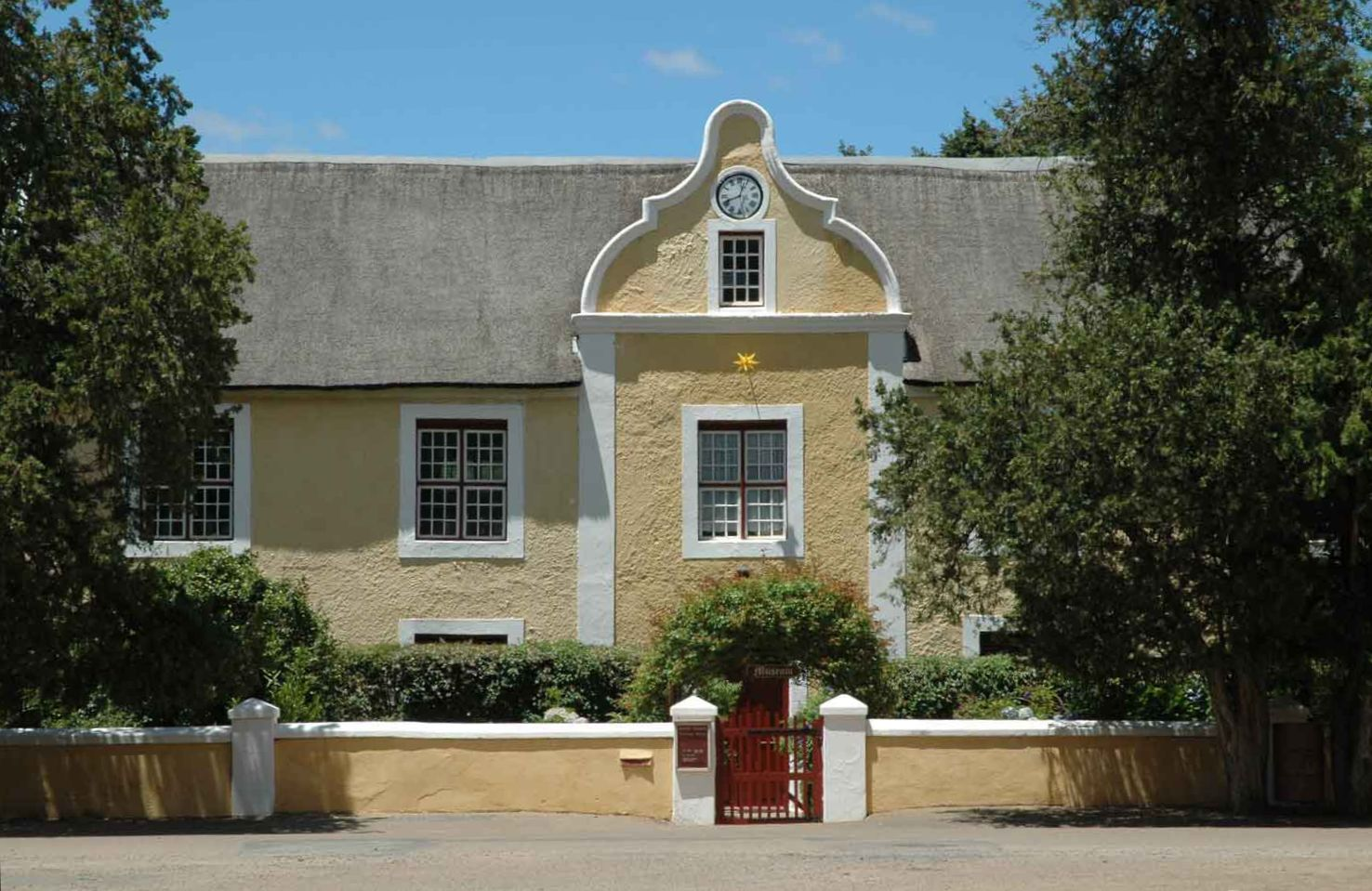
Museum, Genadendal mission station provincial heritage site

Heritage Western Cape is governed by a Council which is appointed by the province's Minister of Cultural Affairs and Sport. It consists of up to 14 members appointed for a three-year term of office. The council meets quarterly and has established an executive committee to manage its business between its meetings. The executive is chaired by the chairperson of the council and is otherwise made up of the chairpersons of standing sub-committees.

The terms of office of the present Council and its sub-committees expire on 31 October 2023.

There are five standing sub-committees which oversee aspects of the day-to-day business of the organisation. They are made up of specialists who are recognised for their expertise and experience in the areas of business of the committees on which they serve.

=== Built Environment and Landscapes Committee (BELCOM) ===
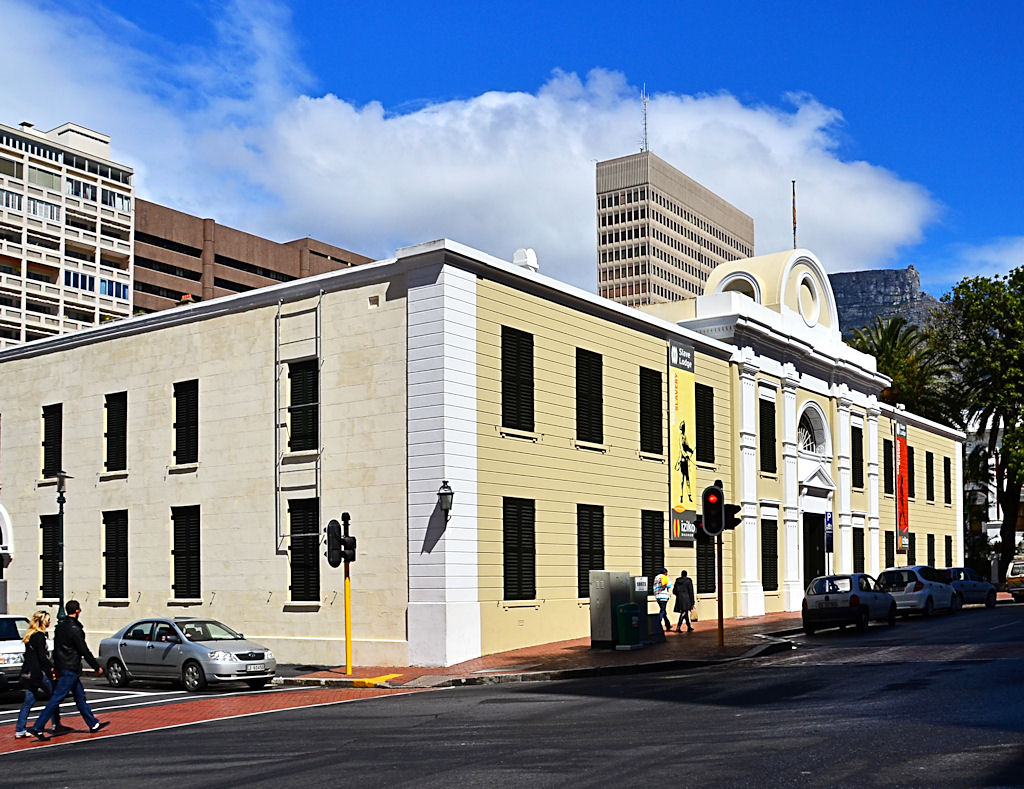
Old Slave Lodge provincial heritage site, Adderley Street, Cape Town

Established in 2003, it considers permit applications relating to structures and landscapes that are provincial heritage sites, provisionally protected, on the register of heritage resources, public monuments or memorials, or older than 60 years. Applications to work on such sites are assessed by the committee to consider whether or not they should be approved. The committee meets monthly.

=== Archaeological, Palaeontological and Meteorites Permit Committee (APM) ===
Applications to work on archaeological and palaeontological sites and meteorite permit applications in the province are considered by the APM Committee. It also considers applications concerning provincial heritage sites, provisionally protected sites and sites on the register of heritage resources that have been protected for their archaeological or palaeontological value. The committee also advises the IACom regarding impact assessments on archaeological, palaeontological and meteorite resources. The committee meets monthly.

=== Impact Assessment Committee (IACom) ===
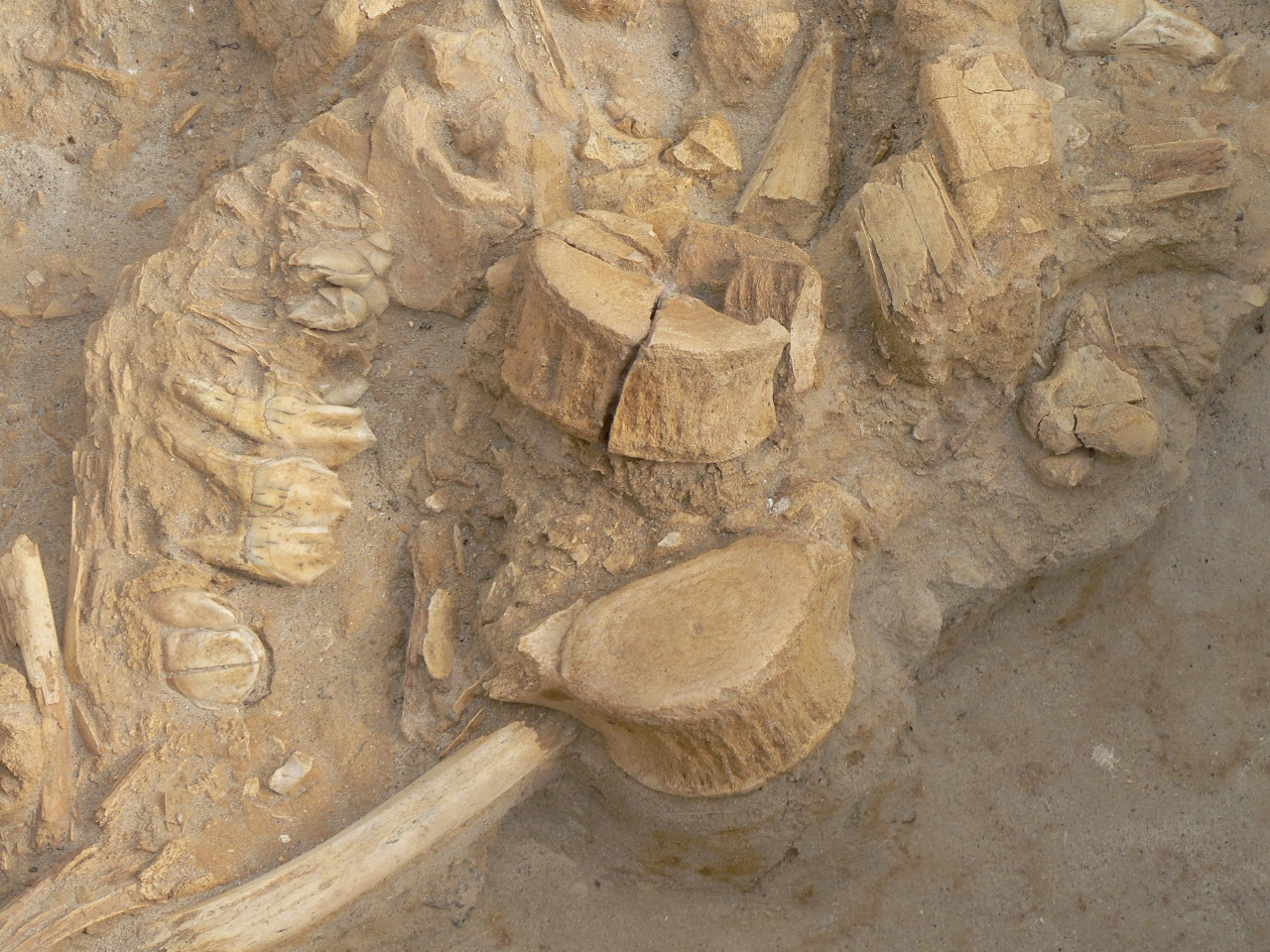
Fossilised whale bones, West Coast Fossil Park provincial heritage site, Langebaan

Established in 2010 it is responsible for considering impact assessments that are submitted to Heritage Western Cape under the terms of the National Heritage Resources Act, the National Environment Management Act, or The Minerals and Petroleum Resources Development Act. The committee meets monthly.

=== Appeals Committee ===
Established in 2003 this Committee deals with appeals made against decisions taken by the committees and staff of Heritage Western Cape. The committee meets monthly. (There is a further right of appeal to a tribunal established by the provincial Minister for Cultural Affairs and Sport.)

=== Inventories, Gradings and Interpretations Committee (IGIC) ===
This committee was established in 2012 via amalgamation of three sub-committees. It considers and makes recommendations to the council on grading of heritage resources; adoption of inventories of heritage resources submitted to Heritage Western Cape by municipalities and conservation bodies; formal protection of sites as provincial heritage sites or placement on the 'register' and texts for the interpretation of heritage sites. The committee meets quarterly.

== Office Bearers ==
=== Chairperson of Council ===
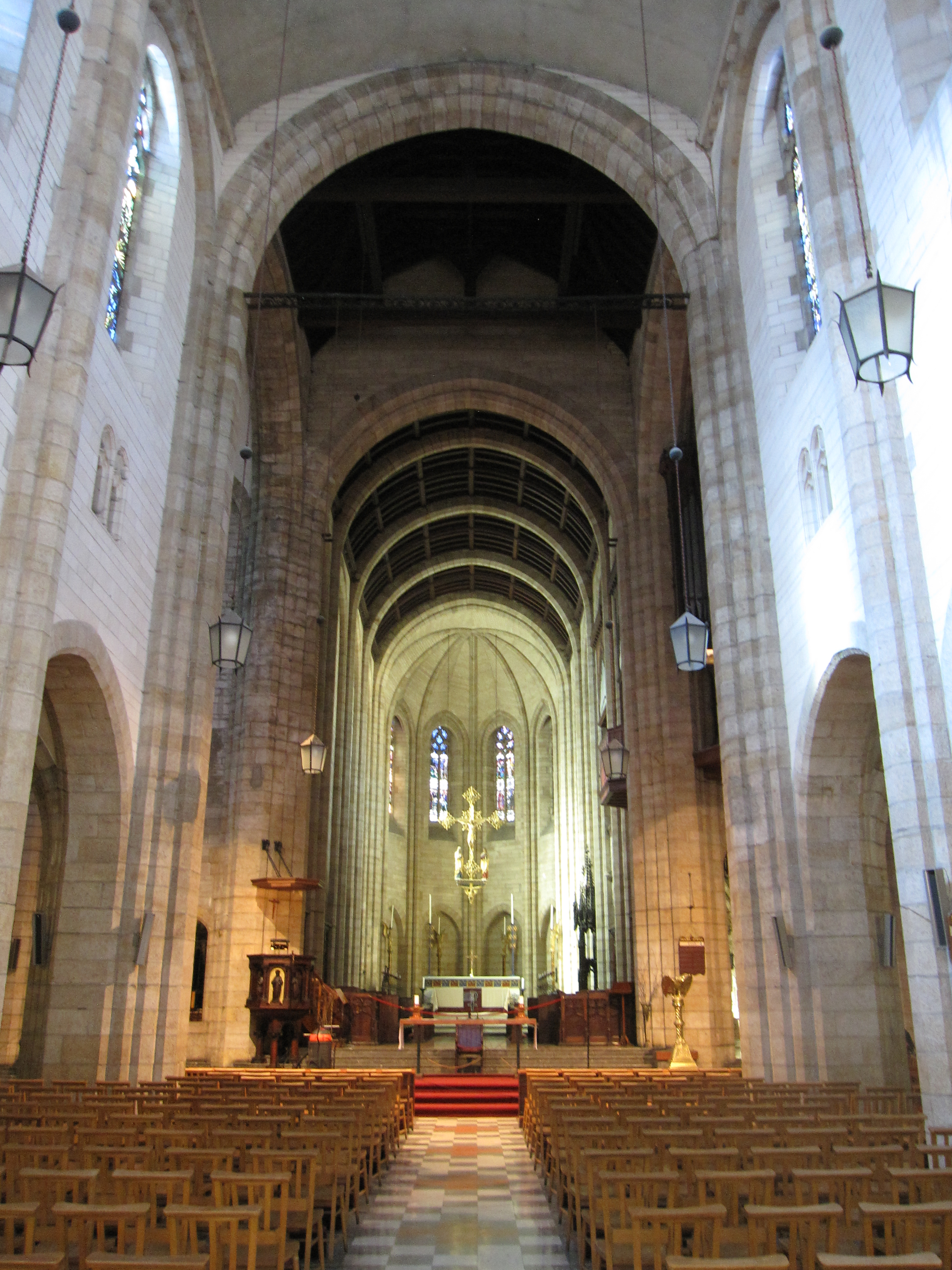
St. George's Cathedral, Cape Town, a site protected for the role it played in South Africa's Liberation Struggle

- Dr Janette Deacon: March 2003 – July 2007
- Dr Mthobeli Guma: August 2007 – July 2010
- Adv Ronee Robinson: August 2010 – July 2013
- Ms Laura Robinson: September 2013 – October 2016
- Dr Antonia Malan: November 2016 – October 2020
- Mr Bongani Mgijima: November 2019 – October 2023
- Ms Reyhana Gani: November 2022 - present

=== Chief Executive Officer (CEO) ===
- Dr Stephen Townsend: April 2006 – September 2007
- Mr Andrew Hall: January 2011 – March 2015
- Dr Mxolisi Dlamuka: March 2016 – November 2020
- Mr Michael Janse van Rensburg: July 2021 – present

== Staff complement ==
Heritage Western Cape is managed by a chief executive officer (CEO) who is assisted by a deputy director. It has the following sections: administrative support, professional services (responsible for processing application) and policy and planning responsible for policy development, research and inventories). The latter two are made up of professional archaeologists, architects, historians and planners.

In terms of delegations from the council the staff deal with areas of responsibility of the organisation not covered by the committees, mainly the processing of applications for minor work on heritage resources. The staff also provides support to and makes recommendations to the council and its sub-committees.

== Provincial heritage sites ==
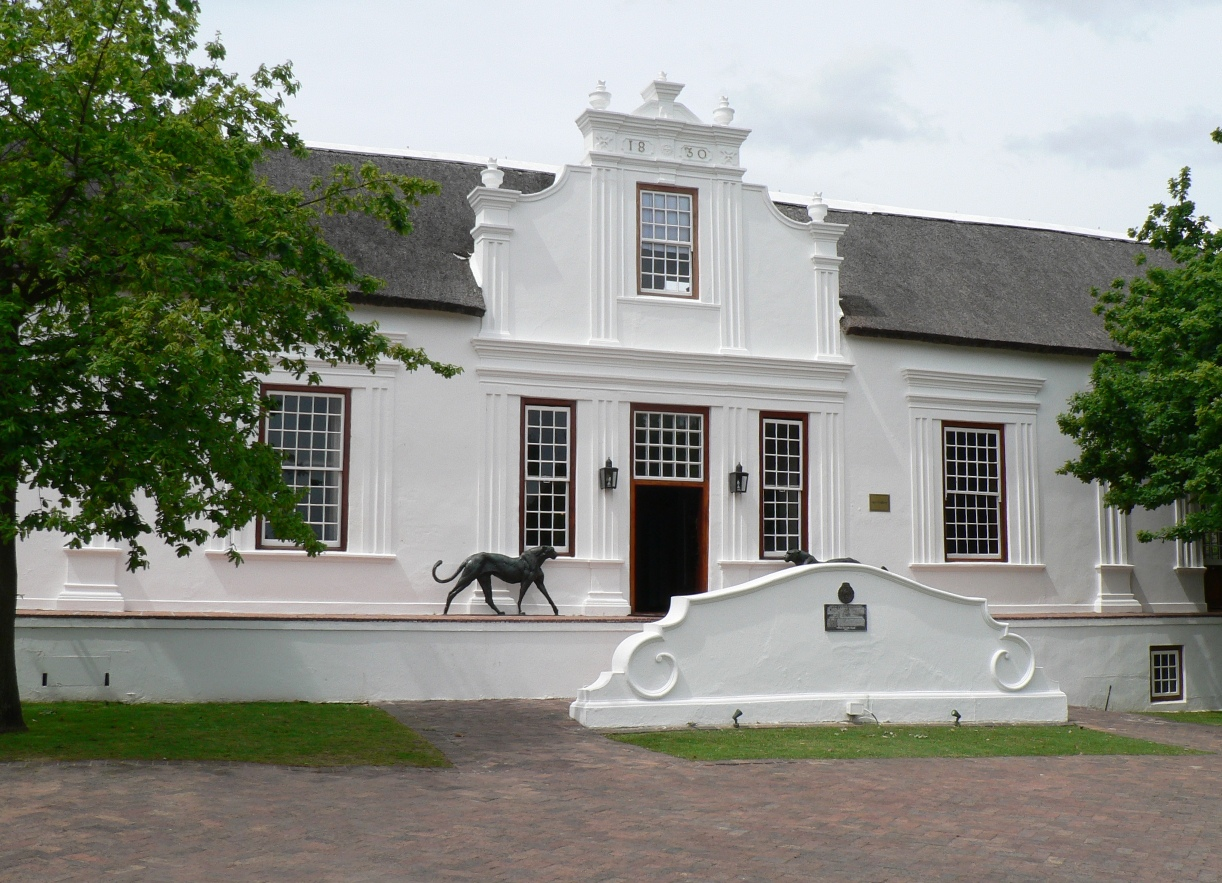
Lanzerac provincial heritage site, Stellenbosch

There are approximately 2,500 provincial heritage sites in the Western Cape. Most of these were declared under legislation that predates the National Heritage Resources Act. Known as "national monuments" from 1969 to 2000 and "historical monuments" from 1934 to 1969, these sites are in the process of being graded in terms of the grading system prescribed by the Act and which determines whether they remain provincial heritage sites, are included in the register of heritage resources or no longer enjoy formal protection.

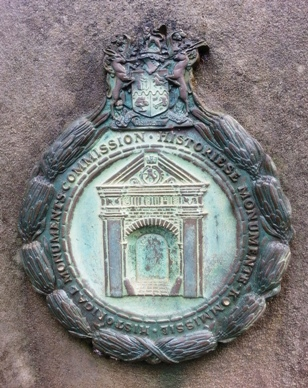
Badge used in South Africa from 1934–1969 to mark what are now Provincial Heritage Sites

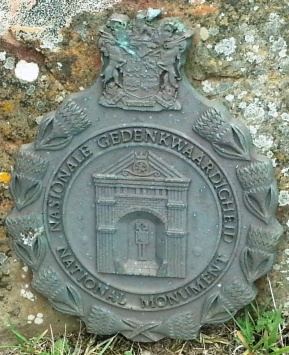
Badge used in South Africa from 1969–2000 to mark what are now Provincial Heritage Sites

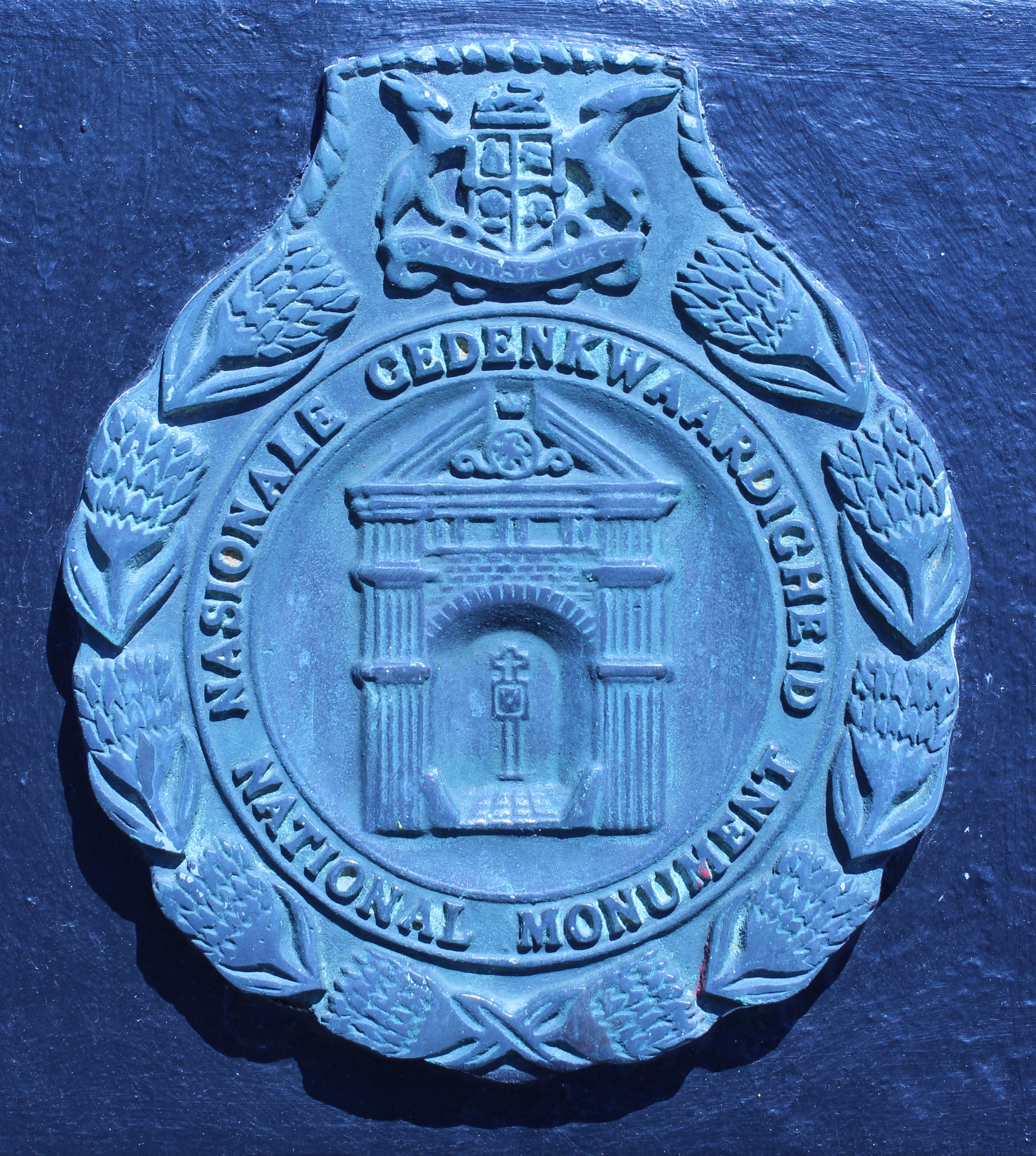
Alternative version of badge used between 1969 and 2000

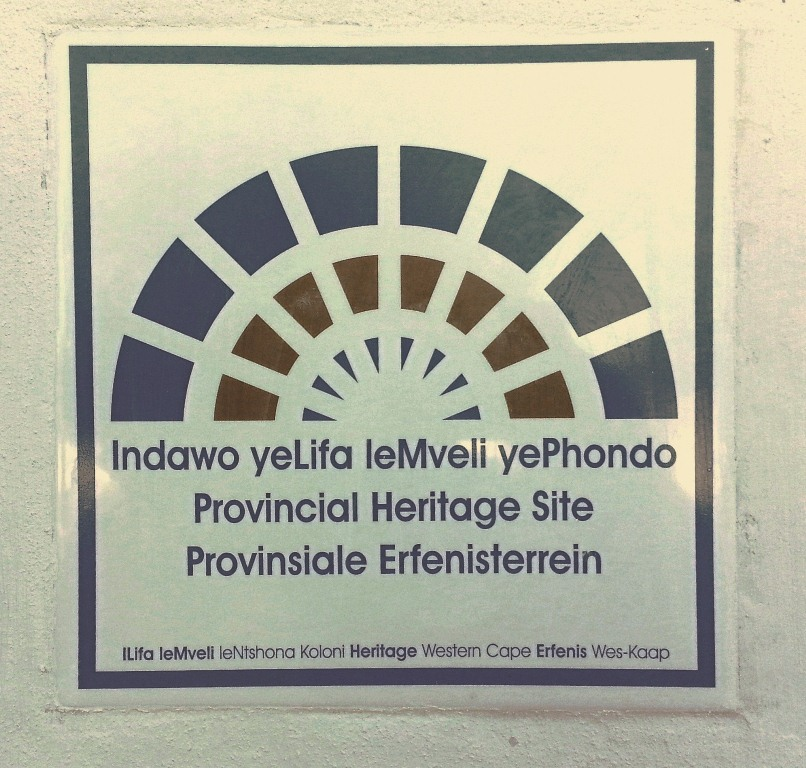
Badge used in the Western Cape since 2012 to replace earlier markers designating Provincial Heritage Sites

=== Sites declared by HWC ===
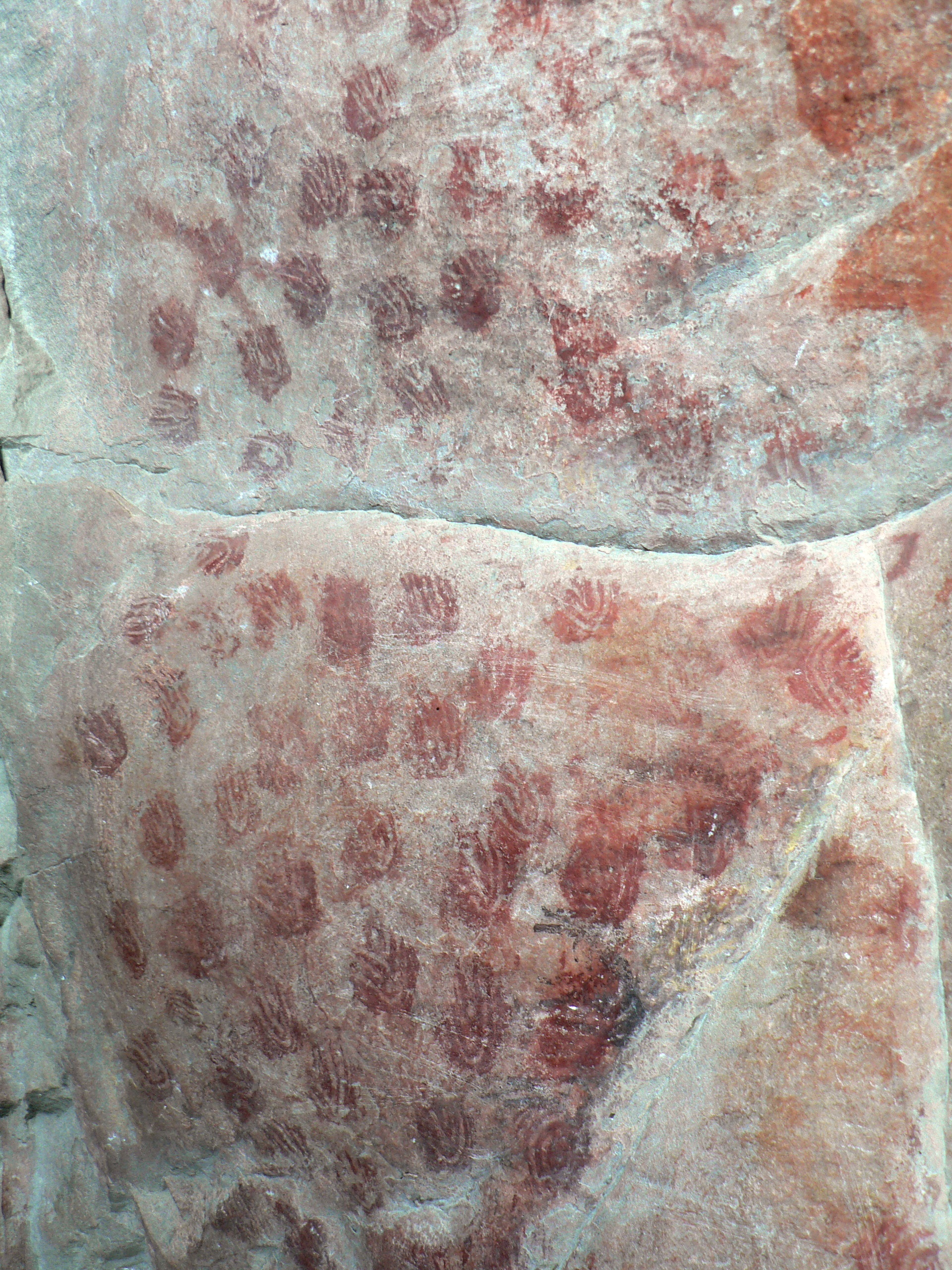
Rock art, Elands Bay Cave, Baboon Point provincial heritage site, Elands Bay

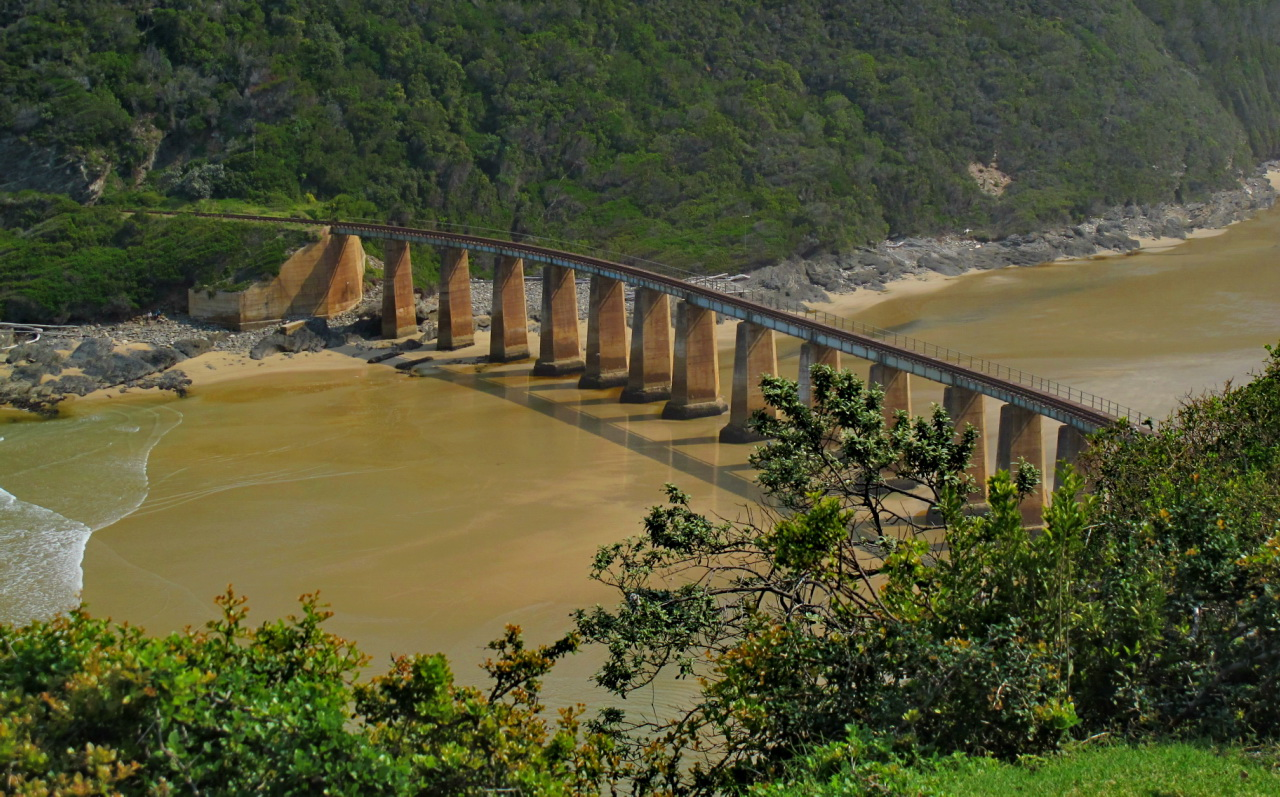
Kaaimans River Bridge provincial heritage site, Wilderness

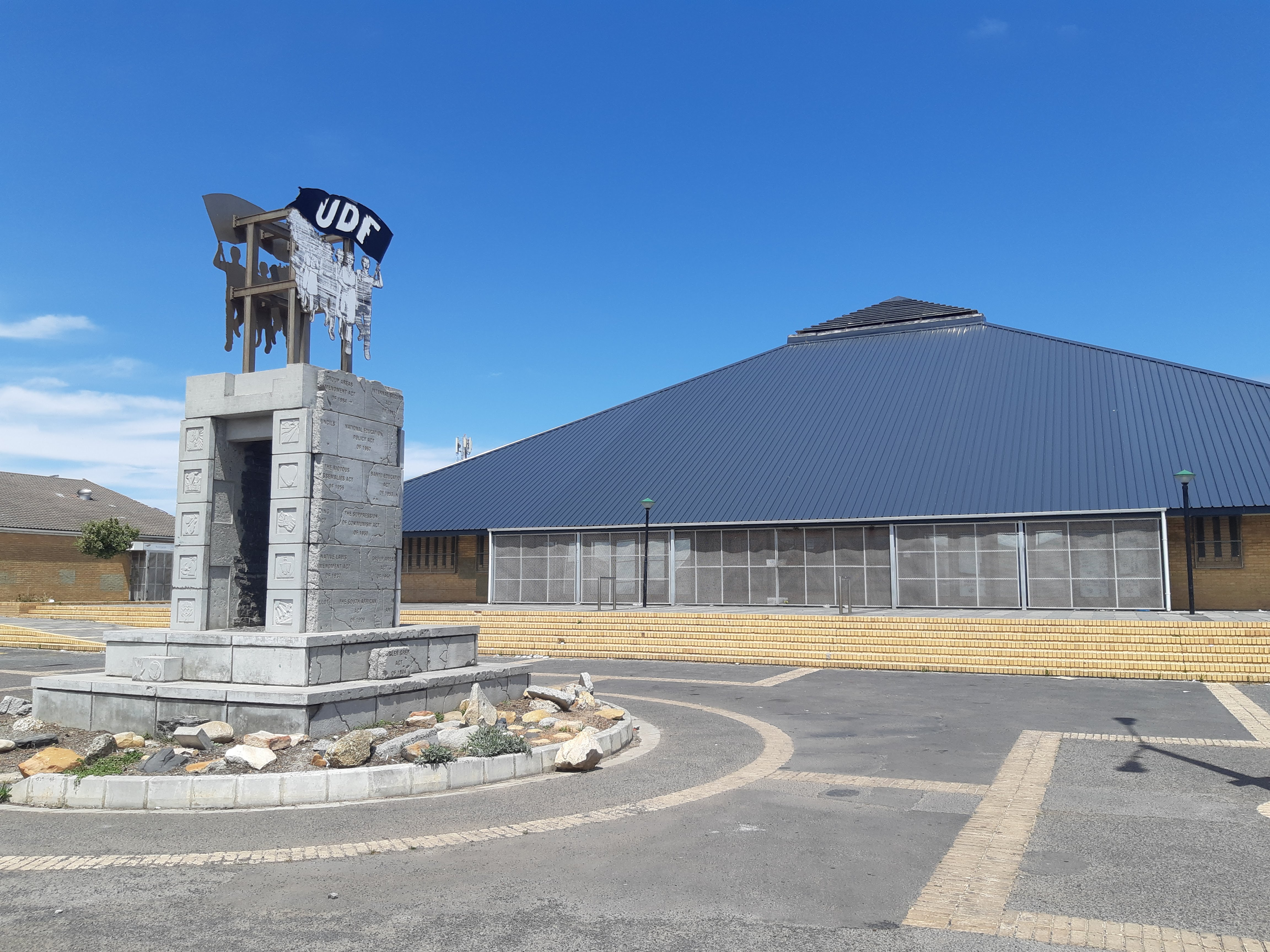
Rocklands Community Hall provincial heritage site, Cape Town

In its early years Heritage Western Cape did not declare any new Provincial Heritage Sites, but has resumed declaration and has since 2009 gazetted the following:

- Baboon Point, 2009
- Mussel Point (Mike Taylor's) Midden, 2009
- Uitkomst Midden, Paternoster, 2009
- Paternoster Midden, 2009
- Community House (Salt River, Cape Town), 2010
- Ratelgat, 2012
- De Hel Forest, 2012
- West Coast Fossil Park, 2012 (extension of existing site)
- Pinnacle Point, 2012
- Saron Mission Station, 2013.
- Harold Cressy High School, 2014.
- St. George's Cathedral, 2014.
- Verlorenvlei Heritage Settlement, 2014.
- Diepkloof Rock Shelter, 2014.
- Hawthorndon House, 2014. (extension of existing site)
- Blombos Cave, 2015
- Elandsfontein Fossil Beds, 2015
- Elandsberg Farm, 2015
- Old Granary Complex, 2016
- Auwal Masjied, Cape Town, 2017
- Lwandle Migrant Labour Museum, Somerset West 2018
- Rex Trueform Factory Complex, 2019
- Vergelegen Estate, 2019
- Rocklands Community Hall, 2019
- Freedom Square, Bonteheuwel, 2021
- Princess Vlei Eco Park, Grassy Park, 2021
- Gugulethu Seven, Gugulethu, 2021
- Battle of Blaauwberg, Blaauwberg Nature Reserve, 2021
- Pass Office, Langa, 2021
- Kaaimans River Railway Bridge, Wilderness, 2021
- Imam Abdol Rakiep Grave Site, Mowbray, 2023

== Inventories of the national estate ==
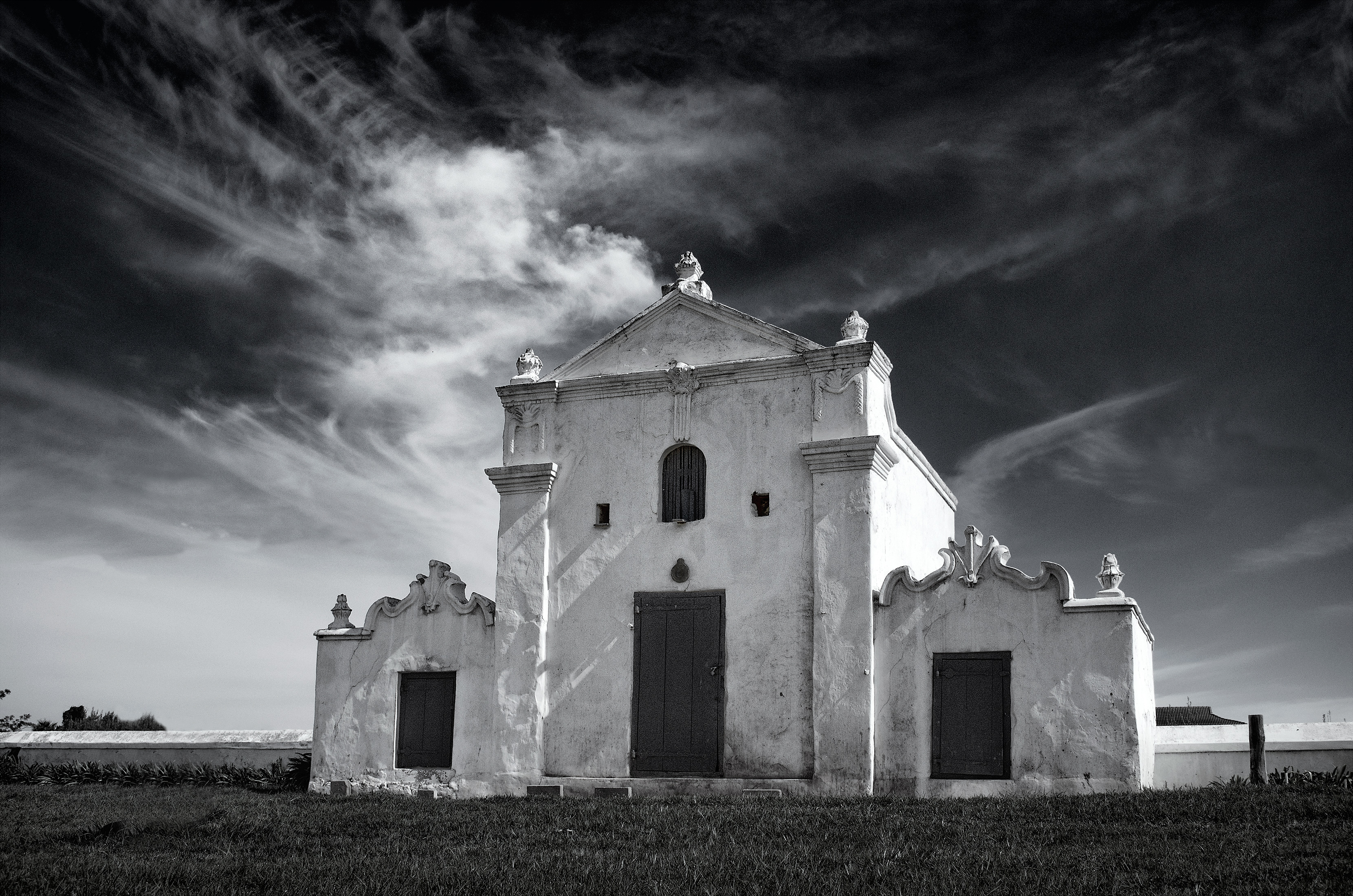
Dove Cote, Overwacht provincial heritage site, Somerset West

Inventories of the national estate consist of identified heritage resources situated within a particular geographical area and/or within a certain category (e.g.: built environment, archaeology, etc.) and must be submitted to Heritage Western Cape at the time of compiling or amending a municipal planning scheme.

Inventories of heritage resources for aspects of the national estate situated in the following municipalities have been submitted to Heritage Western Cape:

- Cape Town (Built environment of various suburbs.)
- Drakenstein (Built and scenic environment of entire municipality.)
- George (Built environment of entire municipality.)
- Knysna (Built environment of the town of Knysna.)
- Overstrand (Built environment of entire municipality.)
- Prince Albert (Built and scenic environment of the town of Prince Albert.)
- Stellenbosch (1. Built environment of historic core of the town of Stellenbosch. 2. University of Stellenbosch Main Campus.)
- Swartland (Built environment of the entire municipality.)
- Witzenberg (Church Street precinct, Tulbagh.)

These inventories deal primarily with built environment in an urban context and are not complete inventories of the municipalities concerned.

== Funding ==
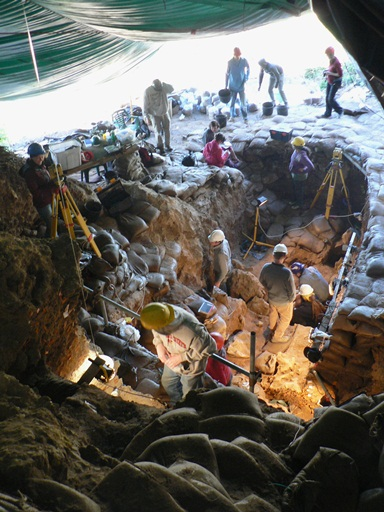
Excavations at Pinnacle Point, a provincial heritage site important to the understanding of the origins of modern humans, and part of the World Heritage Site known as 'The Emergence of Modern Human Behaviour: The Pleistocene Occupation Sites of South Africa', Mossel Bay

Heritage Western Cape receives an annual transfer payment from the Western Cape Department of Cultural Affairs and Sport which covers the bulk of its operational costs. Its staff members are public servants in the employ of the department which carries the cost of their salaries and benefits. Other sources of income include fees levied from charges for processing of applications.

== Conservation bodies ==
Heritage Western Cape is required to register conservation bodies interested in the protection of the national estate in the province. It has registered 84 such organisations which are consulted on matters before the organisation.

== See also ==
- Western Cape
- List of heritage sites in South Africa
- Amafa aKwaZulu-Natali (Heritage KwaZulu-Natal)
- Northern Cape Heritage Resources Authority
- South African Heritage Resources Agency
- National Monuments Council
- Historical Monuments Commission
