= Amanzi Springs archaeological site =

Archaeological site in South Africa

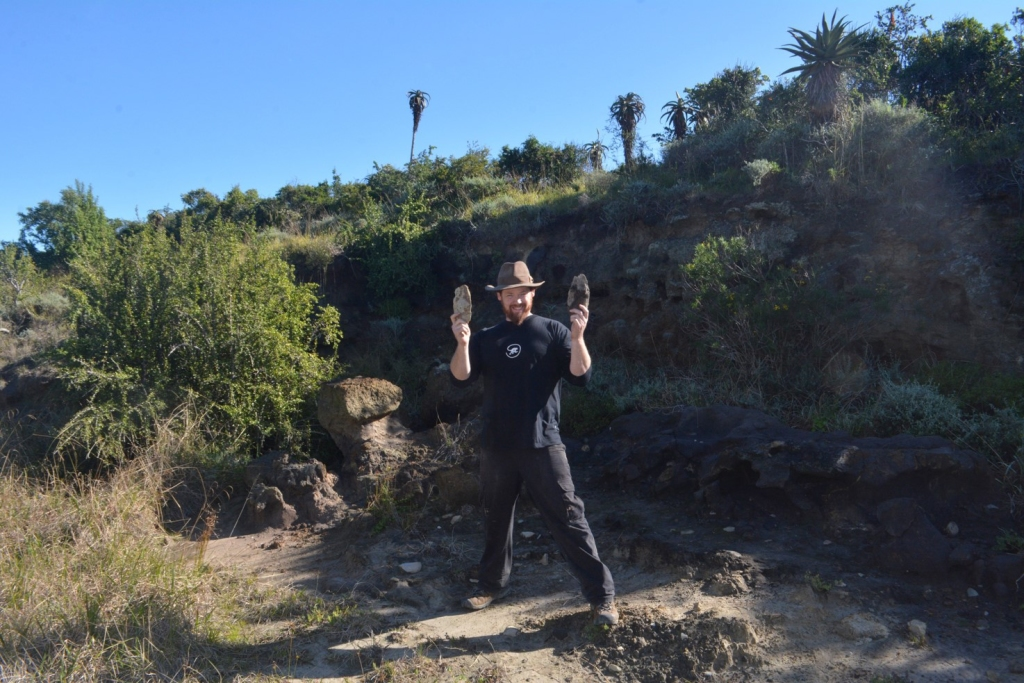
1. Prof Andy Herries standing in the Hilary Deacon Area 1 excavations at Amanzi Springs in 2015.

Amanzi Springs is a series of hydrothermal springs in the Eastern Cape Province of South Africa that have yielded a series of stratified Acheulian artefacts. It is one of only two archaeological sites in Africa, along with Kalambo Falls, that has yielded wood in association with early stone age artefacts (Deacon, 1970). Amanzi Springs is located about 40 kilometres (25 mi) north of Port Elizabeth and 18 kilometres (11 mi) from the coast.

One of the spring eyes (Area 1) was first excavated by Ray Inskeep in 1963. This excavation was then extended and deepened by Hilary Deacon in 1964–66, who also excavated at a second spring eye at the site (Area 2). These excavations establishing thick, stratified Acheulean deposits in both spring eyes, something extremely rare in southern African contexts. The archaeology from these spring eyes are considered to represent late occurrences of the Acheulian, or perhaps even a rare occurrence in South Africa of Sangoan artefacts (Herries, 2011). Despite this fact the site has not been investigated in 50 years. In 2015 a joint research project involving La Trobe University, the University of Johannesburg, and University of Cape Town began at the site and has noted the first occurrence of Middle Stone Age artefacts at the site (Figure 3).

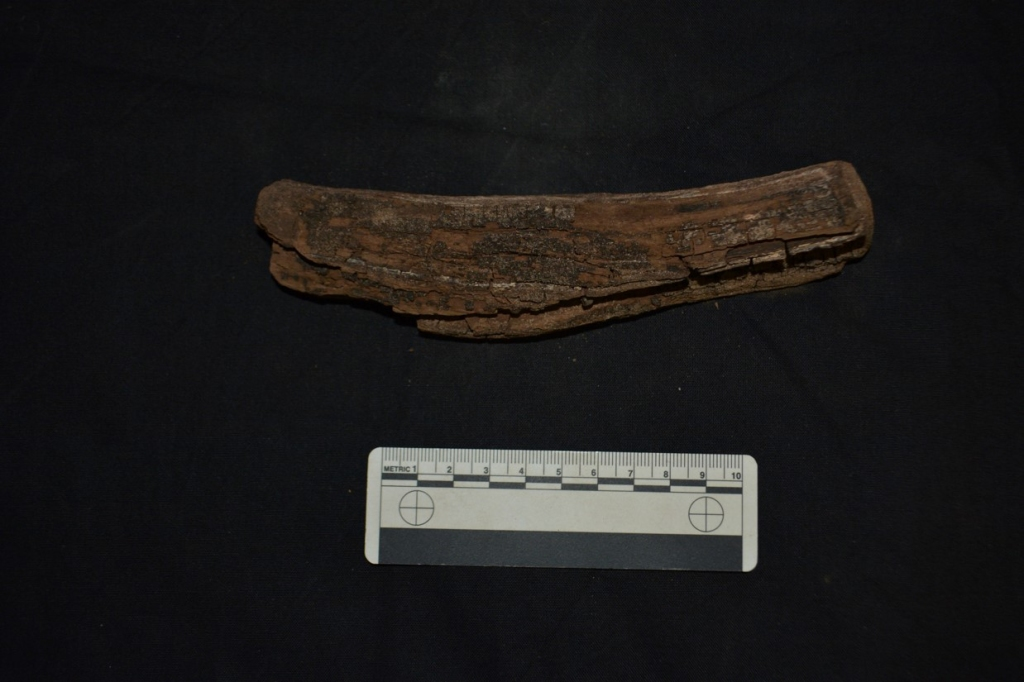
2. Wood found in association with the Acheulian at Amanzi Springs

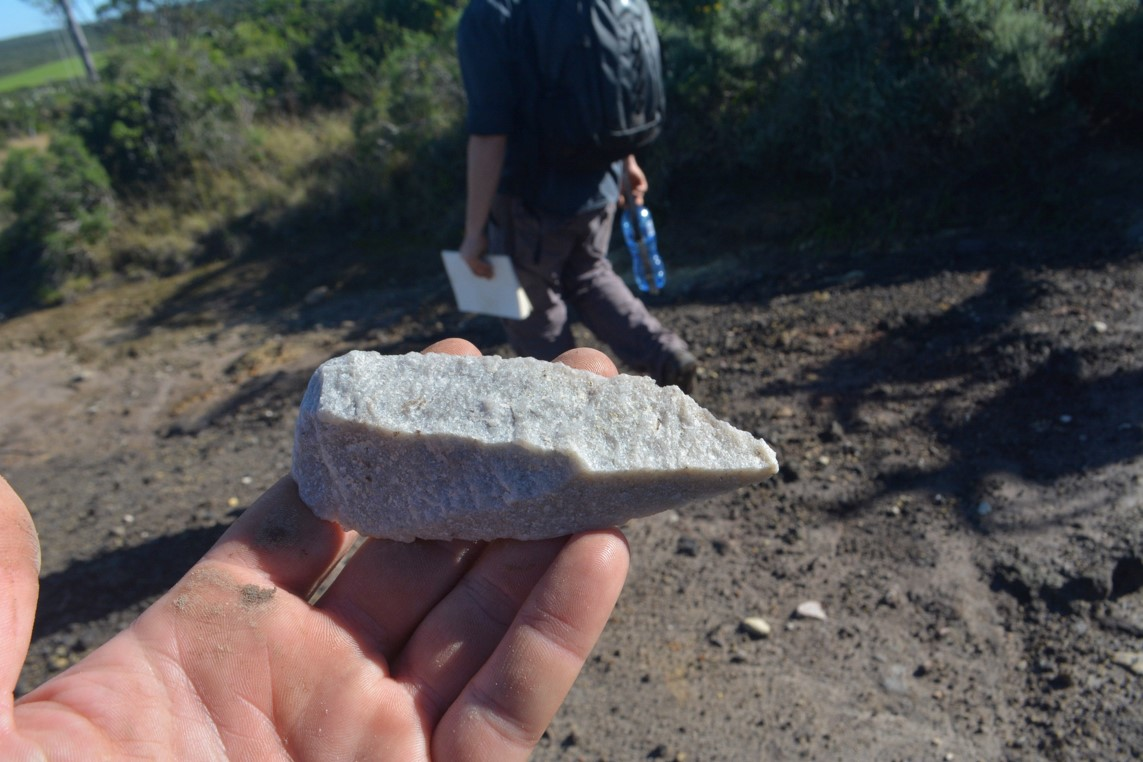
3. An MSA artefact from the Amanzi Springs archaeological site in South Africa
