= Annabel Vundla =

South African aviator

- Born: 1980 (age 45–46); South Africa
- Citizenship: South Africa
- Education: Kingsway Christian School; Mmabatho High School; South African Air Force
- Occupation: Professional pilot
- Years active: Since 1999
- Known for: Aviation
- Title: Flight captain at South African Airways

Annabel Vundla is a South African airline transport pilot, who serves as a flightcCaptain at South African Airways (SAA), the national carrier airline of South Africa. She is the first black female flight captain at SAA, since the airline was founded more than 90 years ago. Before that, she served in the South African Air Force (1999 to 2010) and was a member of the presidential cockpit crew between 2005 and 2010. In addition, she is a military flight instructor.

== Background and education ==
Vundla was born in South Africa in 1980. She grew up in the Mafikeng area in the North West Province, close to the border with Botswana. She attended Kingsway Christian School for her primary education. She transferred to Mmabatho High School for her secondary education.

While at high school aged 15, a recruiting team from the South African National Defence Force (SANDF) visited her school. She signed up. At age 17, following matriculation from high school, she joined the SANDF and underwent two years of military training. In 1999, she joined the South African Air Force as a pilot. Later, she became a military flight instructor.

== Career ==
From 1999 to 2005, Vundla flew for the SAAF, as a pilot and military flight instructor. She was the first black woman to become a pilot and flight instructor in the history of the South African Defence Force. In 2005 she was selected to become a presidential pilot. Between 2005 and 2010, she piloted ex-presidents, including Nelson Mandela, Thabo Mbeki and Jacob Zuma.

In 2010, she joined SAA as a captain on the Boeing 737-800, the first black South African woman to achieve that rank. As of 2022, Vundla had piloted several aircraft classes including the B737-800, the Presidential Inkwazi BBJ1 (Boeing 737-700), the Dassault Falcon 50 and the Cessna Citation II (C550). She is also qualified and certified as captain on the Airbus A319 and Airbus A320 aircraft. As of 2022, Vundla remained on the list of military pilots, and was listed as a reserve pilot in the South African Presidential Squadron.

On 25 October 2022, she piloted a Boeing 737 on Flight SA346 from Johannesburg to Cape Town. The fist officer on that flight was Refilwe Moreetsi. This marked the first time a SAA flight was operated by an all-black female cockpit crew, since the airline was founded in the early 20th century.

== Personal ==
Flight Captain Annabel Vundla is a married mother of two.
