= Ratelgat =

Griqua People
- Griqualand Flag

Total population
- Unknown c. 2 to 5 million

Regions with significant populations
- South Africa, Namibia

Languages
- Afrikaans, English, Korana

Religion
- The Griqua Church (Protestantism)

Related ethnic groups
- Coloureds, Khoikhoi, Nama, Basters, Oorlam, Afrikaners

The farm Ratelgat which was previously known as Luiperdskop, is located on the West Coast of South Africa. The farm has a very strong connection to the Griqua people as it is the site where Griqua prophet Andrew Abraham Stockenstrom le Fleur I (Die Kneg) is buried.

There is an annual pilgrimage to Ratelgat undertaken by Griqua people in May, ending with the celebration of Ratelgat Day.

== Ratelgat Day ==
Ratelgat Day is organised every year by the Griqua National Council (GNC) to give thanks for the long life of the late Paramount Chief AAS le Fleur II and to remember the sacrifices he made for his people. For the Griqua it is also a day to give thanks for God’s promises to bless the Griqua and to pray for the fulfillment of the prophesies of AAS le Fleur I (Die Kneg).

== Provincial Heritage Site ==
The site has been declared a provincial heritage site by Heritage Western Cape on the 12 of May 2012. The site was given special recognition by HWC because of the inspiring role that Die Kneg had played to bring the Griqua community together. the declaration of this site is part of Heritage Western Cape’s drive to highlight important heritage sites that are significant to the Griqua and Khoesan inhabitants of the Western Cape. Ratelgat became the first heritage site in the Western Cape to display the new badge of Heritage Western Cape. The new badge replaces those of the old National Monuments Council which appears on provincial heritage sites and national monuments around the province.

The provincial heritage site was declared in terms of Section 27 of the National Heritage Resources Act. This gives the site Grade II status and provides the site with protection under South African heritage law.

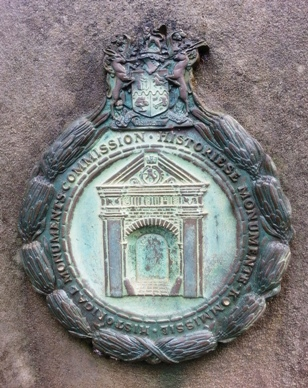
Badge used in South Africa from 1934–1969 to mark what are now Provincial Heritage Sites

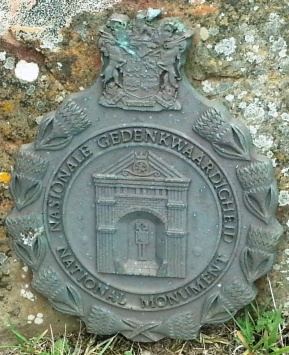
Badge used in South Africa from 1969–2000 to mark what are now Provincial Heritage Sites

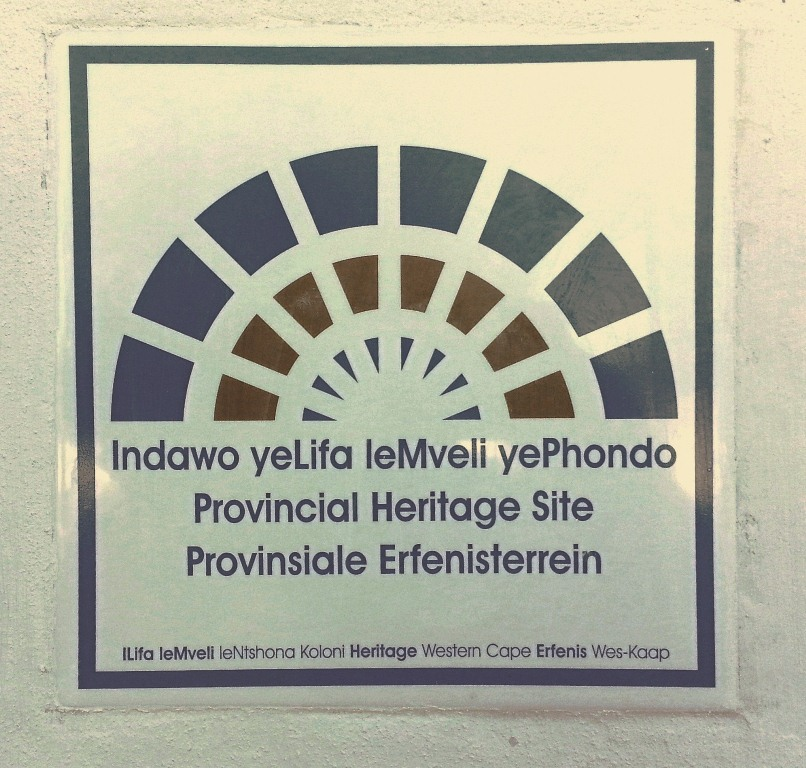
Badge used in the Western Cape since 2012 to replace earlier markers designating Provincial Heritage Sites

== References and External links ==
- Heritage Western Cape
