= West Coast Fossil Park =

Protected area preserving fossil specimens in South Africa

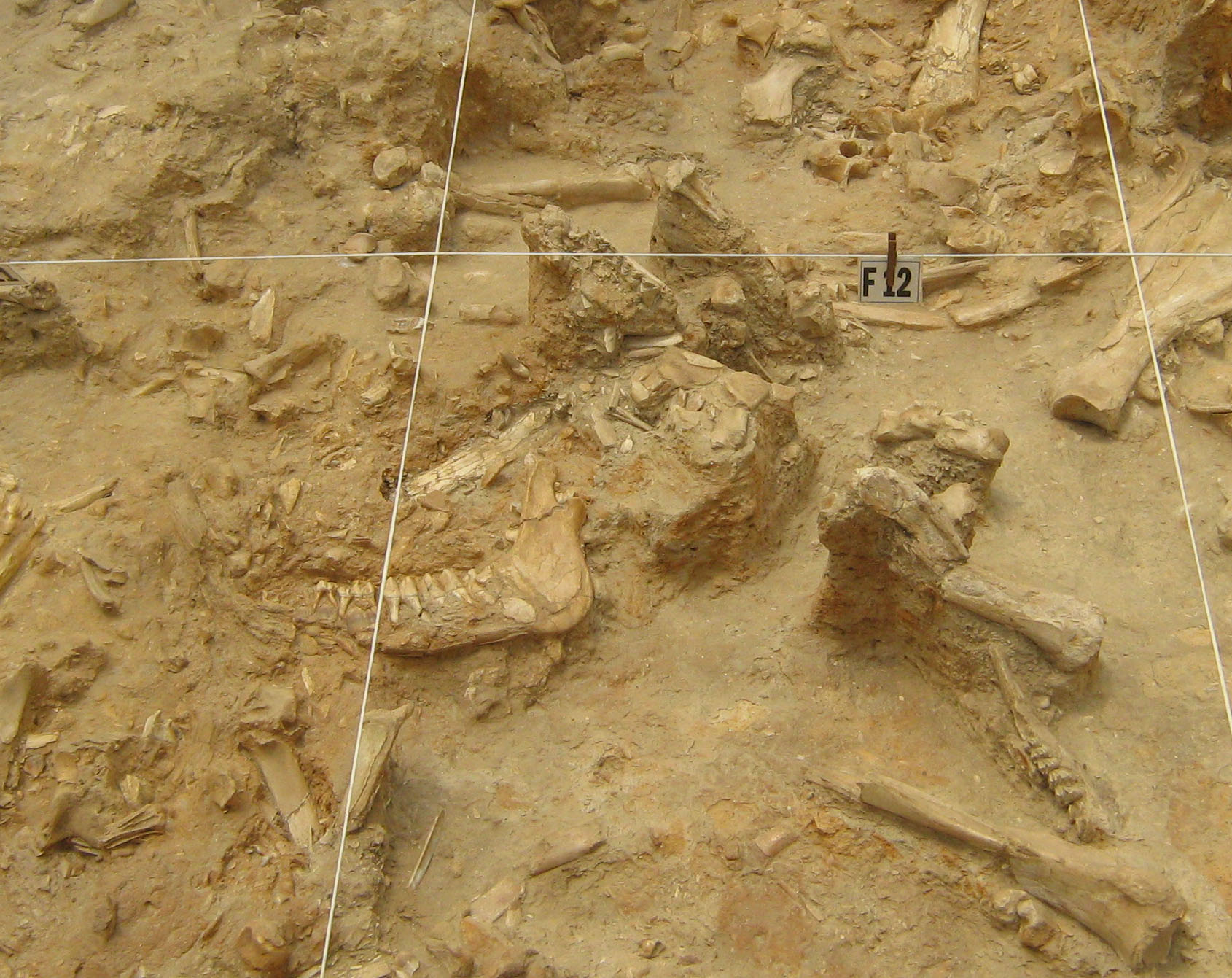
- Fossils in situ at the West Coast Fossil Park excavations
- Interactive map of West Coast Fossil Park
- Coordinates: 32.9592°S 18.1172°E
- Area: Langebaanweg, Western Cape, South Africa
- Created: 1996
- Website: www.fossilpark.org.za

The West Coast Fossil Park is a fossil park near Langebaanweg, Western Cape, South Africa, approximately 150 kilometres (93 mi) north of Cape Town. The fossil sites of Langebaanweg have exceptionally well-preserved remains of fossil fauna that date to circa 5.2 million years ago. In this period, sea levels were higher and many now extinct animals lived in the riverine forests, wooded savanna and along the sea coast near the present day Langebaanweg site. Phosphate mining operations at Langebaanweg uncovered these rich fossil deposits. The fossils include bones of over 300 different animal species. This represents possibly the greatest diversity of five-million-year-old fossils found anywhere in the world. The fossil park was formed after mining operations ceased in 1993. The park is partnered with the Iziko South African Museum.

In 1996, the former National Monuments Council declared the site a national monument. With the introduction of the National Heritage Resources Act in 2000, it became a provincial heritage site and in March 2012 the provincial heritage resources authority, Heritage Western Cape significantly expanded the area that is protected.

== Paleobiota of the Langebaanweg fossil site ==
Genus	Species	Material	Notes	Images
Anura gen. nov.		24 ilia	A new genus of frog; also known from the Pleistocene site Cooper's Cave D	
Enhydriodon	E. hendeyi		A wolf-sized otter, sometimes classified as Sivaoynx hendeyi	
Plesiogulo	P. aff. monspessulanus		A leopard-sized mustelid	
