= Langebaanweg =

- Location within Western Cape Location within South Africa
- Coordinates: 32°58′S 18°9′E
- Country: South Africa
- Province: Western Cape
- District: West Coast
- Municipality: Saldanha Bay

Area
  - Total: 7.09 km^{2} (2.74 sq mi)

Population (2011)
  - Total: 952
  - Density: 134/km^{2} (348/sq mi)

Racial makeup (2011)
  - Black African: 20.9%
  - Coloured: 42.8%
  - Indian/Asian: 0.6%
  - White: 35.1%
  - Other: 0.6%

First languages (2011)
  - Afrikaans: 65.0%
  - English: 18.3%
  - Xhosa: 5.8%
  - Tswana: 2.5%
  - Other: 8.4%
- Time zone: UTC+2 (SAST)
- PO box: 7375

Langebaanweg is a town on the southwest coast of South Africa, in Western Cape Province.

It is the location of the air force base AFB Langebaanweg.

Langebaanweg has been an important mining center, with its main minerals consisting of phosphorites, primarily calcium phosphate. The mining uncovered fossils dating from the late Miocene and early Pliocene, approximately 5 million years ago. Fossil species found there include invertebrates and also a type of rhinoceros, as well as a mousebird and a diving petrel. The West Coast Fossil Park includes displays of fossils found in a former phosphate mine. Brett Hendey, formally of the Iziko South African Museum, documented the significance of the Langebaanweg fossil sites.

Langebaanweg is also notable as the birthplace of former England cricketer Allan Lamb, who played 79 Tests for his adopted country as well as in the 1987 and 1992 Cricket World Cup Finals.
