= Elands Bay =

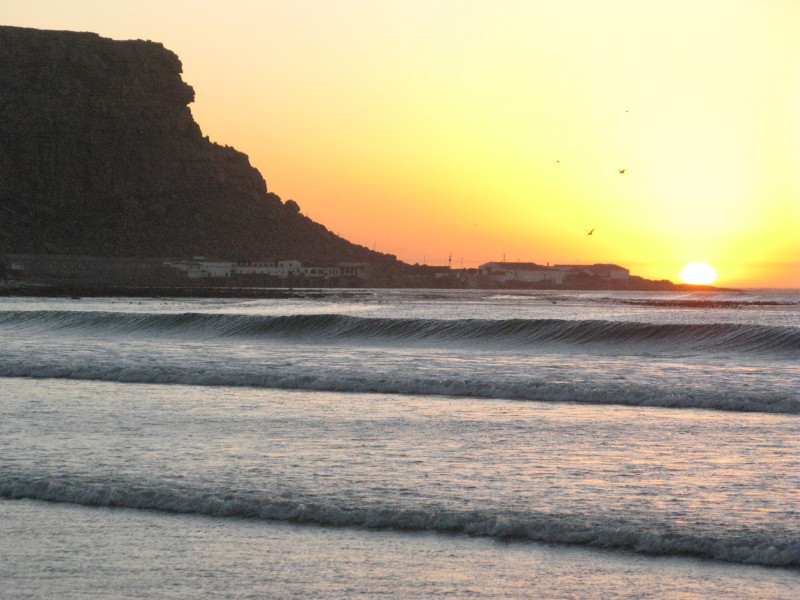
- Baboon Point, Elands Bay

- Location within Western Cape Location within South Africa
- Coordinates: 32°18′S 18°19′E
- Country: South Africa
- Province: Western Cape
- District: West Coast
- Municipality: Cederberg

Area
  - Total: 3.76 km^{2} (1.45 sq mi)

Population (2011)
  - Total: 1,525
  - Density: 406/km^{2} (1,050/sq mi)

Racial makeup (2011)
  - Black African: 30.6%
  - Coloured: 60.1%
  - Indian/Asian: 1.4%
  - White: 7.5%
  - Other: 0.3%

First languages (2011)
  - Afrikaans: 74.7%
  - Xhosa: 17.1%
  - English: 4.0%
  - Other: 4.2%
- Time zone: UTC+2 (SAST)
- PO box: 8110
- Area code: 022

Elands Bay is a town in South Africa, situated in the Western Cape Province, on the Atlantic Ocean, at 32°18′S 18°19′E. The town is located about 220 kilometres (two and a half hours drive) north from Cape Town. It is a world class surfing location and is also noted for its caves, which have a number of rock paintings.

In 2009, Heritage Western Cape declared the Elands Bay Cave and most of Baboon Point (Cape Deseada), on which it is located, as a provincial heritage site. Eland's Bay along with much of this coastline is an "important" bird habitat. The local wetland, Verlorenvlei, is a Ramsar wetland.

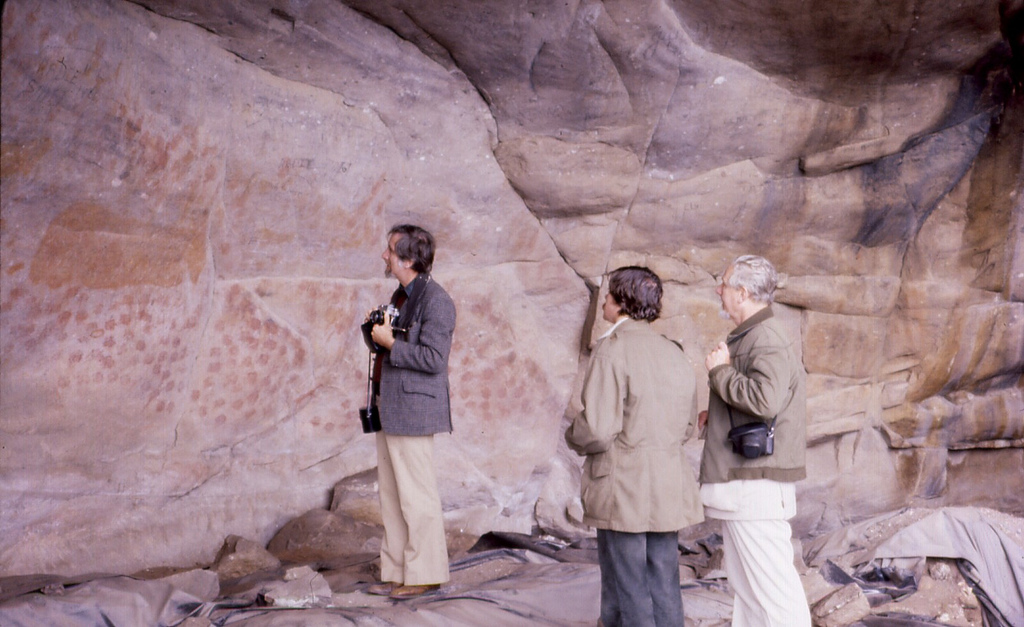
Cave at Eland's Bay

== See also ==
- Mussel Point, a large "prehistoric" shell midden near Elands Bay
- Verlorevlei River
- Elands Bay Cave
