= South African Archaeological Society =

- Predecessor: Cape Archaeological Society
- Formation: 5 June 1945
- Members: 800
- Website: www.archaeology.org.za

The South African Archaeological Society was founded in 1945 to promote public awareness of archaeology and its findings in southern Africa, facilitating interaction between professional archaeologists and people with a lay interest in the subject. The society, through its branches, organizes regular lectures and excursions, and, since its inception, has been responsible for publications including a professional journal and a range of newsletters of a more popular nature at national and branch levels. Informally the society is known as "ArchSoc".

== Origins and membership ==
The Cape Archaeological Society was founded in Cape Town in August 1944 by A.J.H. Goodwin (1900-1959; University of Cape Town).

In the following year, on 5 June 1945, it was agreed to establish the South African Archaeological Society, with membership open to interested persons from neighbouring countries in southern Africa. Today the society has more than 800 individual and institutional members in more than 20 countries.

== Branches and activities ==
Branches of the Society were established and currently exist in Gauteng, Cape Town, Durban/Pietermaritzburg and Bloemfontein/Kimberley. Typically branch activity includes the presentation of lectures and excursions that promote awareness of southern Africa’s past as revealed by archaeology. Archaeologists, and scholars from cognate disciplines, actively engaged in research in the subcontinent regularly contribute to these programmes. The spectrum of sub-fields reflected include human evolution, Stone Age archaeology, the histories of hunter-gatherers, herders, Iron Age farmers and early European colonists, rock art, past environments and climate change, and historical shipwrecks.

The society actively supports conservation of archaeological resources, lobbying relevant parties including government to heed national heritage concerns, particularly where archaeological sites are threatened or damaged by mining or development. The society makes funds available for research, while a major objective from the outset was to publish the findings of Southern African archaeology.

== Publications ==
In December 1945 the first issue of the South African Archaeological Bulletin (SAAB) was published, a biannual peer-reviewed academic journal. Since 2005 it has been edited by the Association of Southern African Professional Archaeologists.

In 1972 the first volume of an occasional publication, the Goodwin Series, named after the founder of the Society, was published. Several themed issues have appeared since then.

Monographs have also been published.

A newsletter, started in 1978, has been known from 1984 as The Digging Stick. Individual branches have, in addition, brought out their own newsletters. The society also communicates with the public at large by way of national and branch websites.
