= Mussel Point =

Protected area in South Africa

- Mike Taylor's Midden
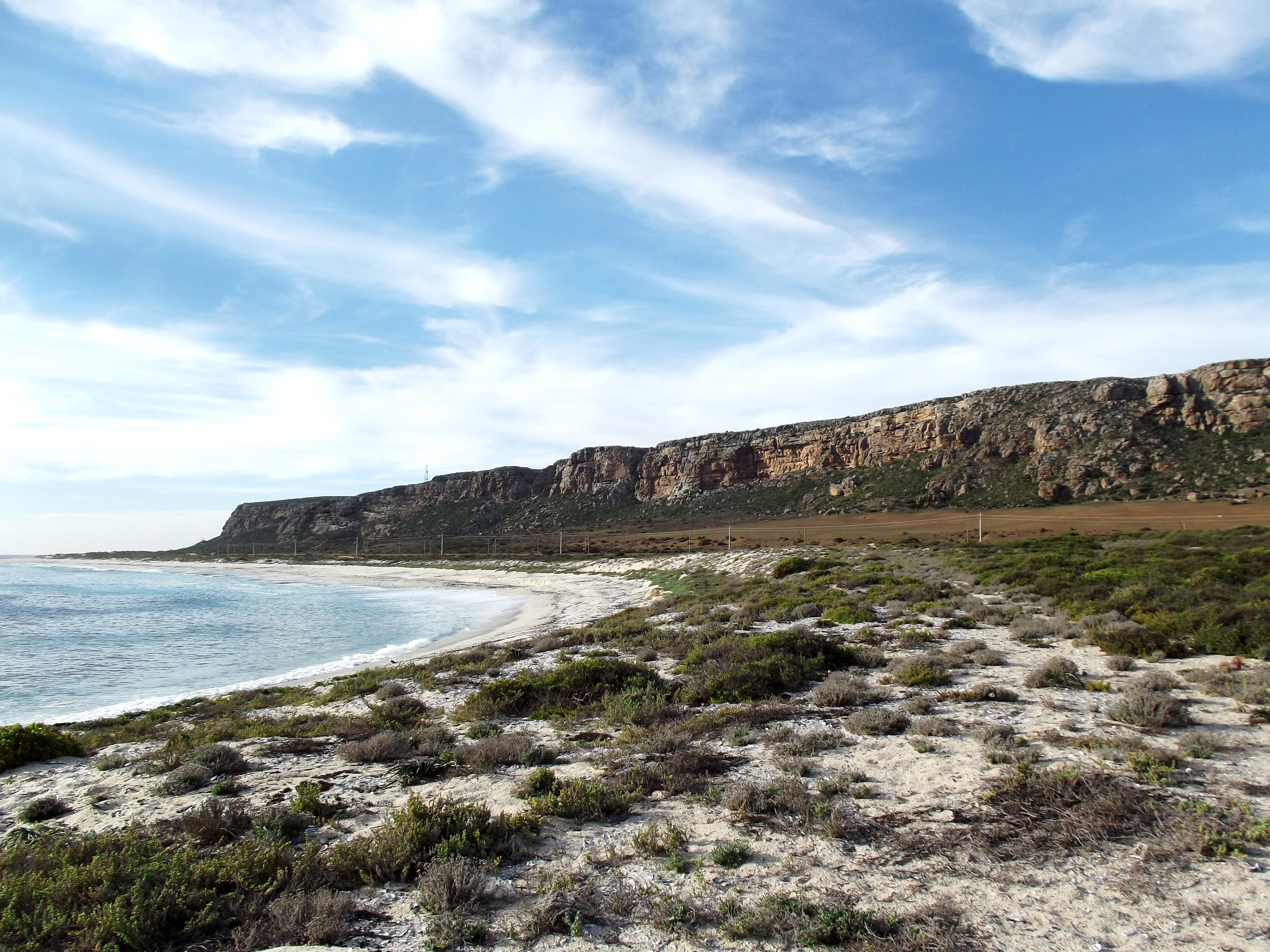
- General view of Mussel Point Provincial Heritage Site

- Location within Western Cape
- Location: Elands Bay, Cederberg Local Municipality, Western Cape
- Coordinates: 32°20′12″S 18°18′59″E

Mussel Point also known as Mike Taylor's Midden (MTM) is possibly the largest of 13 megamiddens found along the South African West Coast. MTM is the only open site with remains from the early pottery period (3,000 and 2,000 years before present) in the Elands Bay and Lamberts Bay areas at 32°18′S 18°19′E.

There are only a handful of shell middens along the West Coast of South Africa that are as large and deep as Mussel Point. These very large sites, named "megamiddens", are the expression of unique social and economic (subsistence) solutions to environmental and demographic challenges that precolonial San hunter-gatherers faced between 3,000 and 2,000 years before present (BP). MTM is at least 350 metres (1,150 ft) long and 200 metres (660 ft) wide and has a depth that varies between 1.0 to 1.5 metres (39 to 59 in). It dates to between 980 and 2,800 BP, however, much of this occupational sequence dates to between 2,100 and 2,500 BP. For this reason, MTM is singular among megamiddens in that it offers the best chronological resolution (greatest volume for shortest time) for the later part of this unique period of the precolonial history of South Africa.

== Megamiddens ==
Megamiddens are large shell middens that are found along the shoreline of the West Coast and consist of large mounds of shells (mostly from mussels, along with barnacles, whelks, limpets, those of tortoises, and fish and bird bones). The megamiddens were created over a 1,200-year period, between 3,000 and 1,800 years ago. The middens have been studied extensively since the 1970s, particularly by archaeologists.

A significant debate has developed among scholars about the purpose of the middens and the history of the people who lived on the South African West Coast during the Later Stone Age.

== Provincial heritage site ==
In April 2009, the provincial heritage resources authority Heritage Western Cape declared Mussel Point a provincial heritage site in the terms of Section 27 of the National Heritage Resources Act. This gives the site Grade II status and provides the site with protection under South African heritage law.
