= Stilbaai Tidal Fish Traps =

Archaeological fish traps in Stilbaai, South Africa

- Noordkapperpunt Stone-Walled Fish Traps (Afrikaans)
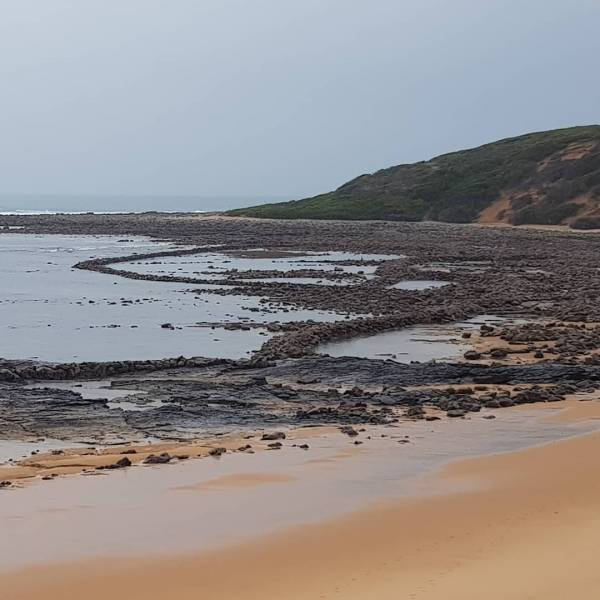
- Interactive map of Stilbaai Tidal Fish Traps
- 34.39650°S 21.41377°E
- Type: Fish trap
- Location: Stilbaai, South Africa

Site notes
- Management: CapeNature
- Public access: yes
- Stilbaai Tidal Fish Traps (Western Cape) Stilbaai Tidal Fish Traps (South Africa)

The Stilbaai Tidal Fish Traps (also known as the Noordkapperpunt Stone-Walled Fish Traps) are ancient intertidal stonewall fish traps (Afrikaans: visvywers) that occur in various spots on the Western Cape coast of South Africa from Gansbaai to Mosselbaai.

Only a handful occur on the east coast. There are several concentrations of fish traps on the Hessequa coast between Gouritsmond, 30 km east of Stilbaai, with Witsand 35 km to the southwest. The fish traps are located on the edge of the Skulpiesbaai Nature Reserve and the Stilbaai Marine Protected Area. In 2018, they were declared a National Heritage Site.

These fish traps are constructed in such a way that they form pools of varying size in the intertidal zone. They operate on the principle that at high tide during new-moon (i.e. dark-moon) spring tides, fish swim over the walls to feed. As the water recedes with the turn of the tide, the fish get trapped in the enclosure. It is then an easy matter to remove the fish from the almost dry trap.

== Prehistoric roots ==
Stilbaai's fish traps are still-working relics from the past, both the recent and very distant past. Most of the existing fish traps that can still be seen have been built during the past 300 years, some as recently as the latter part of the 20th century, whilst others, according to Avery, could date as far back as 3,000 years ago, but he stresses that this does not preclude a possibly of an even more ancient origin.

The evolution of fishing stretches back much further than 3,000 years ago. From an analysis of the Middle Stone Age layers at Blombos Cave, Klasiesrivier Caves, Die Kelders, Herolds Bay, Sea Harvest and Hoedjies Punt, it appears that sea food, including fish, has been part of the human diet for a very long time - at least 100,000 years ago.

One of the easiest ways of harvesting fish, would have been gathering those stranded in natural tidal pools after the turn of the tide. Enhancing the fish-trapping properties of tidal pools by a few well-placed stones would be a logical next step, followed eventually by man-made pools. Thus, while it is unknown exactly when the tradition of building and repacking tidal fish traps originated, it is most likely that it dates back to the Middle Stone Age (which stretched from about 250,000 to 25,000 years ago).

== Construction ==
The tidal fish traps consist of low walls of boulders and pebbles constructed across gullies or other suitable localities within the intertidal zone. Where no gullies or big rocks are present, complete artificial enclosures may be built. A trap site usually consists of a series of traps ranging in size from about 10 m² to as big as half a football field.

Traps are only efficient if the stones are packed in a certain way. The wall must form a virtually solid wall with a horizontal top, built to a level which would be covered by at least 0.5–1.0 m of water as the waves come in at spring high tide. The landward face tends to be vertical while the seaward face usually is sloped. This provides less resistance and turbulence to incoming waves and therefore more subtle access to fish. As a certain amount of displacement occurs through wave action, repacking of the walls is necessary after each spring tide. Today this is done by some local farmers and interested people who also use the traps to catch fish at spring tide.
