= Mangelia muiri =

Scientific classification
- Kingdom: Animalia
- Phylum: Mollusca
- Class: Gastropoda
- Subclass: Caenogastropoda
- Order: Neogastropoda
- Superfamily: Conoidea
- Family: Mangeliidae
- Genus: Mangelia
- Species: M. muiri

Binomial name
- Mangelia muiri K.H. Barnard, 1958

Synonyms
- Mangilia muiri K.H. Barnard, 1958

Species of gastropod

Mangelia muiri is a species of extremely small sea snail, specifically a marine gastropod mollusk in the family Mangeliidae.

They are an interesting example of the incredible diversity of life in the ocean, with many species still awaiting discovery and study.

== Description ==
The Mangelia muiri are tiny snails, typically measuring around 2-3 millimeters in length. Their shell grows to a length of 2.75 mm and a diameter of 1.5 mm. The shell of the sea snail is slender, elongated, and has a distinctive shape, with a short spire and a long, narrow aperture.

== Diet ==
As carnivorous snails, Mangelia muiri feed on small invertebrates, such as plankton, bristle worms, or other tiny animals.

== Distribution ==
These snails inhabit shallow waters, usually in coral reefs or rocky areas, or tropical and subtropical regions. Mangelia muiri are found in various parts of the world, including the Indo-Pacific region, the Caribbean, and the Mediterranean. They are also found off of Still Bay, South Africa.
