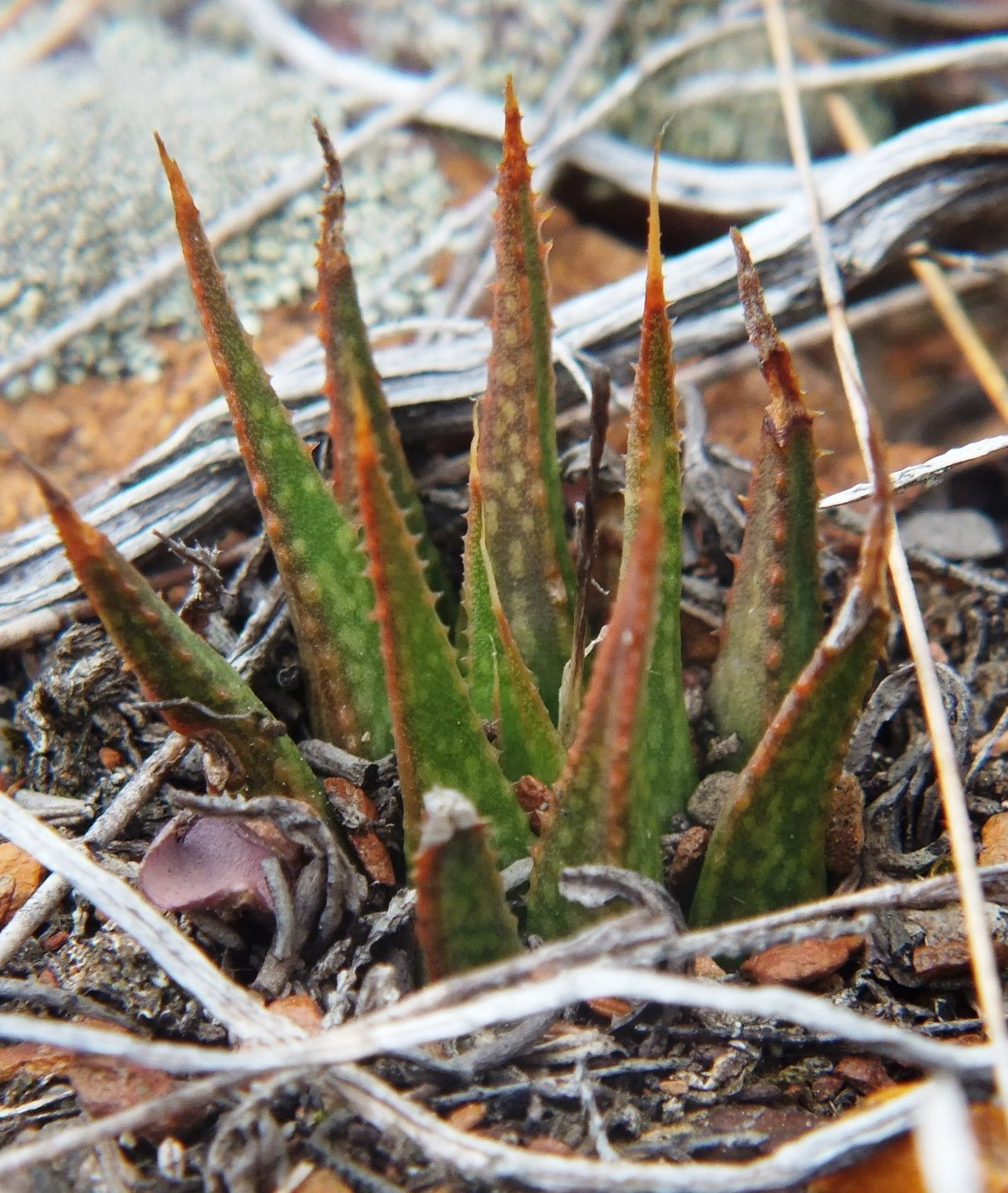

Scientific classification
- Kingdom: Plantae
- Clade: Tracheophytes
- Clade: Angiosperms
- Clade: Monocots
- Order: Asparagales
- Family: Asphodelaceae
- Subfamily: Asphodeloideae
- Genus: Haworthia
- Species: H. variegata

Binomial name
- Haworthia variegata L.Bolus, (1929)

Synonyms
- Haworthia chloracantha var. variegata (L.Bolus) Halda; Haworthia chloracantha subsp. variegata (L.Bolus) Halda

= Haworthia variegata =

Species of succulent

Haworthia variegata is a perennial succulent belonging to the genus Haworthia and is part of the fynbos. The species is endemic to the Western Cape and occurs from Bredasdorp to Swellendam and Stilbaai.
