= Erica curtophylla =

Scientific classification
- Kingdom: Plantae
- Clade: Tracheophytes
- Clade: Angiosperms
- Clade: Eudicots
- Clade: Asterids
- Order: Ericales
- Family: Ericaceae
- Genus: Erica
- Species: E. curtophylla

Binomial name
- Erica curtophylla Guthrie & Bolus

Species of flowering plant

Erica curtophylla, the curved-leaf heath, is a plant belonging to the genus Erica and forming part of the fynbos. The species is endemic to the Western Cape. The plant occurs at Milkwoodfontein near Riversdale and Stilbaai.
