= Stephen Alvarez =

American photojournalist

Stephen Alvarez (born 1965) is an American photojournalist. He is founder and president of the Ancient Art Archive, a global initiative to record, preserve, and share high-resolution images of ancient artwork. Throughout his career, he has produced global stories about exploration and culture. He became a National Geographic photographer in 1995. His pictures have won awards in Pictures of the Year International and Communications Arts and have been exhibited at Visa Pour L’Image International Photojournalism Festival in Perpignan, France.

== Life and education ==
Stephen Alvarez was born in Sewanee, Tennessee, where he continues to reside with his family. In 1987 he graduated from The University of the South with a B.A. in Comparative Religion.

== Career ==
An avid cave explorer from his youth, Alvarez received his first professional assignment from Time Magazine in 1991 to photograph discoveries in Mammoth Cave. This was the first of many assignments to photograph cave exploration and underground landscapes throughout the world. His first National Geographic assignment in 1995 took him over 20,000 feet up into the Peruvian Andes to photograph the discovery of a 500-year-old Incan Mummy Juanita, popularly known as the Ice Maiden. Other work for National Geographic took him to Borneo to document exploration of the caves of Sarawak to aid in their conservation. In Belize, Alvarez covered a 1999 jungle expedition to map Chiquibul, the longest cave in Central America.

Alvarez's work has taken him to remote and near-inaccessible locations around the globe. In Mexico he photographed a poisonous hydrogen sulfide cave, Cueva de Villa Luz, where scientists study clues to the origins of life. In 2001 National Geographic sent him to the Middle East to photograph the deserts of the Empty Quarter and the immense caves of Oman on the Selma Plateau, including Majlis al Jinn. For a 2004 article, The Nature Conservancy assigned Alvarez to document ongoing cave conservation and exploration in the southeastern United States. That same year, Alvarez won a Banff Centre grant to photograph the Cave of the Swallows, a deep vertical pit in Mexico, presenting his work at Banff in 2006. Alvarez photographed the deepest cave in the world, Voronya Cave, located 2000 meters beneath the Caucasus Mountains in the breakaway Russian republic of Abkhazia. He photographed subterranean Rome in 2005 for National Geographic. In 2006 National Geographic assigned Alvarez the story Raging Danger, which documents the river caves of Papua New Guinea. This story won a Communication Arts award in Editorial Series.

Much of his photojournalistic work covers threatened and marginalized populations. "Maya Underworld," published in the November 2004 issue of National Geographic, took Alvarez to Mexico, Guatemala, Belize and Honduras. The story explores the worldview of today's Maya peoples through their rituals and religion as well as their archeological past. Alvarez was invited to exhibit this work at Visa pour L’Image International Photojournalism Festival in 2005. In 2004 he took a break from magazine assignments to document the ongoing conflict and its aftermath in northern Uganda and southern Sudan. One of his photographs of the cycle of violence on the Uganda/Sudan border won an award in 2004 Pictures of the Year International. In 2011 he was photographer and videographer for an NPR series titled "Nashville: Up From Prostitution," which described the work of Magdalene, a two-year recovery program founded by the Reverend Becca Stevens.

Traveling across the Pacific in 2007, Alvarez photographed "Peopling the Pacific," a story about the earliest voyagers of the Pacific Islands. His adventure included sailing on the traditional Hawaiian vessel, the Hokule'a. The story was published in National Geographic in March, 2008. "Deep South," Alvarez's photographs of caves in the southeastern United States, including Rumbling Falls Cave, Tennessee, was published in the June 2009 National Geographic. Other National Geographic assignments include coverage of Madagascar's Tsingy de Bemaraha Stone Forest in November 2009; a story covering the impact of White-nose syndrome on bats in December 2010; and an exploration of the tunnels, sewers and catacombs of underground Paris for the February 2011 issue, a story that was also featured on NPR.

In 2012, Alvarez undertook an assignment on behalf of National Geographic Creative and Microsoft Corporation to photograph the world's seven natural wonders using only a Nokia Lumia smartphone camera. The project took him from the base of Mount Everest to Victoria Falls and the Great Barrier Reef.

== The Ancient Art Archive ==
In 2014, while on assignment for a National Geographic story on the roots of artistic expression (published as "The Origins of Art" in the January 2015 issue), Alvarez photographed prehistoric cave paintings in France's Chauvet Cave. As Alvarez described it, the experience of photographing the cave art—some as much as 35,000 years old—inspired him to find a way to “digitally preserve what’s there and deliver that to many more people than could otherwise see it.” In 2016 Alvarez launched the Ancient Art Archive, a project to use photography, 3D modeling, and Virtual reality technology to capture detailed, three-dimensional records of ancient works of art. The Archive's board of advisors include archaeologists Jan Simek and Christopher Henshilwood, Arctic researcher and diver Joseph B. MacInnis, and Van Ling, visual effects supervisor on James Cameron's Titanic and many other films. To date the Ancient Art Archive has created explorable 3D models of rock art of Bears Ears National Monument, Chauvet Cave, Utah's San Rafael Swell, and precontact-era cave art of the Chickasaw Nation.

== Awards and Exhibits ==
- Banff Mountain Centre Grant and Exhibit 2004
- Pictures of the Year International 2004
- Communications Arts 45 (2004)
- Visa Pour L’Image Exhibit 2005
- National Geographic Lecture Under the Map 2006
- PDN Photo Annual 2006
- Uganda/Sudan Border Project 2006
- The Aftermath Project Auction 2006
- Communications Arts 48, Editorial Series (2007)
- White House News Photographers Association, Best use of Photography and Audio, 2012
- National Geographic Store London, 2014
- Mobile World Congress, Barcelona 2016
- World Media Awards, London 2016 (w/Microsoft Corporation)

== Publication with contributions by Alvarez ==
- National Geographic Rarely Seen: Photographs of the Extraordinary. National Geographic, 2015. Compiled by Susan Tyler Hitchcock. ISBN 9781426215612. With a foreword by Alvarez.
