= Ancient Art Archive =

Organization recording prehistoric art

The Ancient Art Archive (AAA) is a nonprofit organization dedicated to the preservation, visual documentation, and sharing of prehistoric works of art, particularly cave painting and petroglyphs, around the globe. The organization was founded in 2016 by photographer Stephen Alvarez following an assignment to photograph France's Chauvet Cave for National Geographic. As part of its mission to create and distribute 3D images of ancient artwork for educational purposes—many of which are threatened by climate change, mining operations, and vandalism—the Archive has launched the Mural of America, a collaboration of anthropologists, archaeologists, and Native American artists to document and provide cultural and scientific context to ten North American cultural landmarks. In 2022, members of the Archive team received wide media attention for their use of 3D photography in uncovering previously unseen cave art in Alabama's 19th Unnamed Cave.

== Founding ==
In 2014, while on assignment for a National Geographic story on the roots of artistic expression (published as "The Origins of Art" in the January 2015 issue), Alvarez photographed prehistoric cave paintings in France's Chauvet Cave. As Alvarez described it, the experience of photographing the cave art—some as much as 35,000 years old—inspired him to find a way to "digitally preserve what's there and deliver that to many more people than could otherwise see it." In 2016 Alvarez launched the Ancient Art Archive, a project to use photography, 3D modeling, and Virtual reality technology to capture detailed, three-dimensional records of ancient works of art. The Archive's founding board of advisors included archaeologists Jan Simek and Christopher Henshilwood, Arctic researcher and diver Joseph B. MacInnis, and Van Ling, visual effects supervisor on James Cameron's Titanic and many other films. To date the Ancient Art Archive has created explorable 3D models of rock art of Bears Ears National Monument, Chauvet Cave, Utah's San Rafael Swell, and precontact-era cave art of the Chickasaw Nation.

== Discovery of prehistoric art in 19th Unnamed Cave ==
In 2022, Simek, Alvarez, and Alan Cressler (a photographer and hydrologic technician with the United States Geological Survey) teamed up to document Northern Alabama's 19th Unnamed Cave (so named to keep its location secret for preservation purposes). The cave, which Simek and Cressler had previously explored in the 1990s, is less than half a meter high and contains multiple artworks engraved into the clay ceiling, which Simek and colleagues identified as the work of Native American artists between 500 CE and 1000 CE. The purpose of the project (in conjunction with the Archive's Unnamed Caves Project) was to use photogrammetry to capture high-resolution images of the cave and its artworks. During the mapping of the cave, Alvarez captured more than 16,000 separate images that were later assembled by software into a fully explorable 3D model.

Although the original purpose of the photogrammetric photography was simply to measure distances and relationships between the engravings, on later analysis the images revealed engravings that had been previously undetectable due to naturally accumulating mud, the shallowness of the etched drawings, and the cave's narrow confines. These works of art—believed by Simek to be among the largest in North America—included three anthropomorphs (humanlike figures), an enigmatic figure, and an eleven-foot engraving of a snake (possibly an eastern diamondback rattlesnake that was sacred to Indigenous people during the Woodland Period).

The use of 3D photogrammetry to identify cave art has been called "exemplary and important work" by Carla Klehm, an archaeologist at the University of Arkansas, Fayetteville (UAF), while University of South Florida archaeologist Thomas Pluckhahn observed that the project helped overturn previously held beliefs that "forty years ago, no one would have thought the southeast had much cave art." The team's discovery was covered by global media including The Guardian, The New York Times, CNN, NBC News, USA Today, National Geographic, and Smithsonian.

== The Mural of America ==
In 2023 the Ancient Art Archive launched The Mural of America, an initiative to document, share, and provide cultural and scientific context for ten landmark sites across North America. According to Alvarez, the project seeks to "reframe American History to include the first 20,000 plus years of human habitation of the American continents." The project will feature the work of Native American anthropologists, archaeologists, and artists as part of an educational for children combining virtual reality exhibits and hands-on activities. Its principal collaborators include a number of the Archive's core team members: anthropologist Joe Watkins, Ph.D., a member of the Choctaw Nation of Oklahoma; filmmaker Josh Cawley, a descendant of the Northwestern band of the Shoshone Nation; and Dustin Mater, a multimedia artist, storyteller, and member of the Chickasaw Nation. The Mural of America's inaugural project is an annotated 3D capture of Devilstep Hollow in Alvarez's home state of Tennessee.

== Exhibitions and appearances ==
- In September 2023, a selection of Alvarez's images of ancient artworks were presented by Vanderbilt University's Curb Center in an exhibition titled Reverberations: Roots of the Cedar Tree.
- In February 2024, Alvarez and Mater were featured speakers at the National Geographic Society's Storytellers Summit, where they presented the work of The Mural of America.

== Core team ==
- Joe Watkins, Ph.D., Choctaw archaeologist
- Dustin Mater, Chickasaw multimedia artist
- Stephen Alvarez, photographer
- Stephanie Welsh, executive director
- James Cawley, filmmaker
