= Blombos Cave =

Archaeological site in Western Cape, South Africa

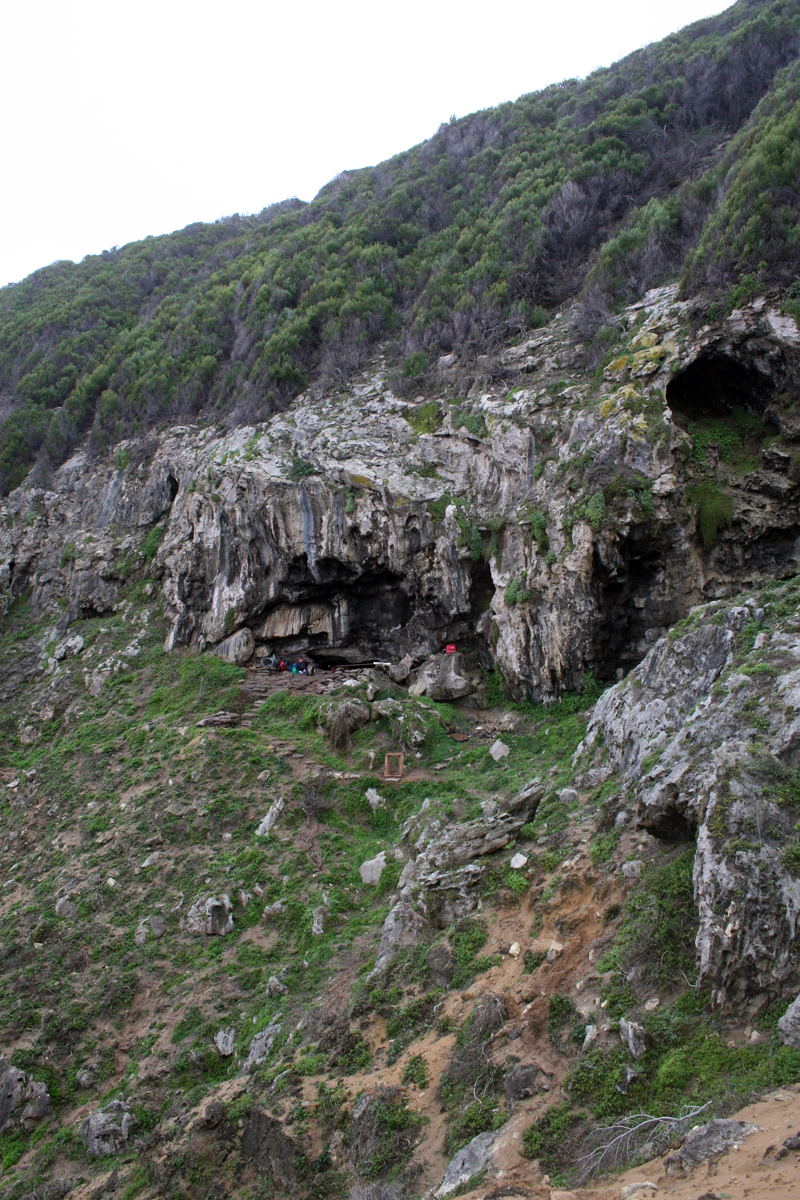
- Blombos Cave

- Location within Africa Location within Western Cape
- Location: Blombos Private Nature Reserve, Heidelberg, Western Cape, South Africa
- Coordinates: 34°24′52″S 21°13′21″E

Blombos Cave is an archaeological site located in Blombos Private Nature Reserve, about 300 km east of Cape Town on the Southern Cape coastline, South Africa. The cave contains Middle Stone Age (MSA) deposits currently dated at between c. 100,000 and 70,000 years Before Present (BP), and a Late Stone Age sequence dated at between 2000 and 300 years BP. The cave site was first excavated in 1991 and field work has been conducted there on a regular basis since 1997, and is ongoing.

The excavations at Blombos Cave have yielded important new information on the behavioural evolution of anatomically modern humans. The archaeological record from this cave site has been central in the ongoing debate on the cognitive and cultural origin of early humans and to the current understanding of when and where key behavioural innovations emerged among Homo sapiens in southern Africa during the Late Pleistocene. Archaeological material and faunal remains recovered from the Middle Stone Age phase in Blombos Cave – dated to ca. 100,000–70,000 years BP – are considered to represent greater ecological niche adaptation, a more diverse set of subsistence and procurements strategies, adoption of multi-step technology and manufacture of composite tools, stylistic elaboration, increased economic and social organisation and occurrence of symbolically mediated behaviour.

The most informative archaeological material from Blombos Cave includes engraved ochre, engraved bone ochre processing kits, marine shell beads, refined bone and stone tools and a broad range of terrestrial and marine faunal remains, including shellfish, birds, tortoise and ostrich egg shell, and mammals of various sizes. These findings, together with subsequent re-analysis and excavation of other Middle Stone Age sites in southern Africa, have resulted in a paradigm shift with regard to the understanding of the timing and location of the development of modern human behaviour.

On 29 May 2015 Heritage Western Cape formally protected the site as a provincial heritage site.

Cross-hatching done in ochre on a stone fragment found at Blombos Cave is believed to be the earliest known drawing done by a human in the world.

== Excavation history and research context ==
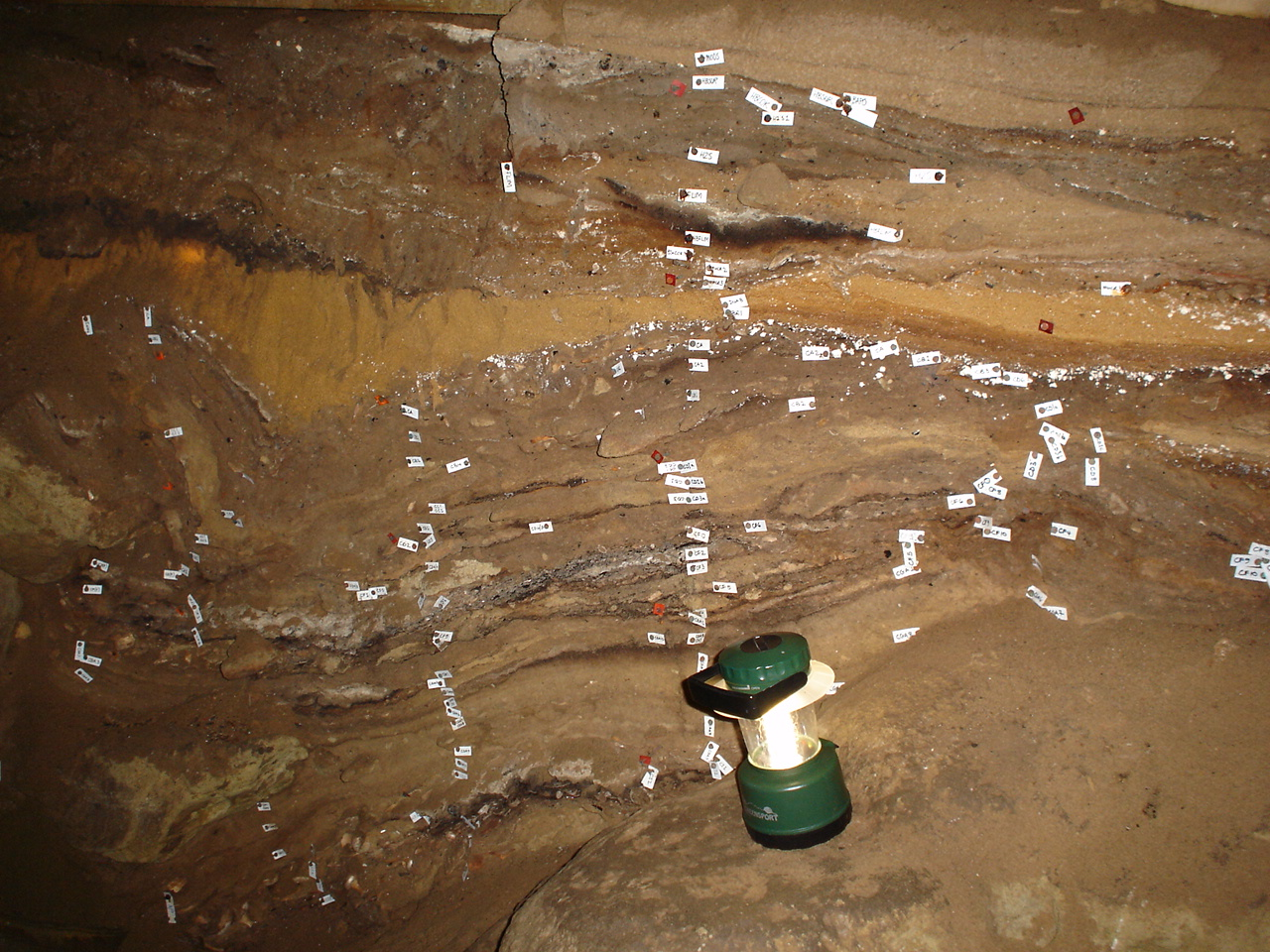
Stratigraphy in Blombos Cave

Blombos Cave was first excavated in 1991–1992 as a part of Professor Christopher S. Henshilwood's (1995) doctoral thesis. at the University of Cambridge: Holocene archaeology of the coastal Garcia State Forest, southern Cape, South Africa. Blombos Cave was originally one of nine Holocene Later Stone Age sites that Henshilwood excavated and it was first given the acronym GSF8 (Garcia State Forest, site no. 8). In 1997 GSF8 was renamed Blombos Cave and given its current acronym: BBC. From 1999 to 2011 in total ten field seasons, each six weeks long, have been carried out at the cave site.

From the initial excavations conducted in the early 1990s, the Blombos Cave project has adopted and established new and innovative research agendas in the study of southern African prehistory. While Henshilwood's initial, doctoral research was directed towards the more recent Later Stone Age occupation levels, the focus since 1997 has been on the Middle Stone Age sequence. The Blombos Cave project has since then developed academically, economically and administratively, from being a local and small-scale test excavation to becoming an international, full scale, high-technological archaeological project.

In 2010–2015 the cave site was the focus of the multi-disciplinary, pan-continental research program, the TRACSYMBOLS project. It was led by Professor Christopher S. Henshilwood based at the Department of Archaeology, History, Cultural Studies and Religion at the University of Bergen and the University of the Witwatersrand, South Africa, together with Professor Francesco d'Errico from the University of Bordeaux 1, France. The aim of TRACSYMBOLS project is to examine how key behavioural innovations emerged among Homo sapiens and Homo neanderthalensis in southern Africa and Europe respectively, and to explore whether and how environmental variability influenced this development between 180,000 – 25,000 years ago, primarily by combining archaeological results, original multi-proxy palaeoenvironmental data and climatic simulations for two continents.

From 2017 the cave site continues to be excavated by many of the same researchers under the newly funded Centre for Early Sapiens Behaviour (SapienCE) at the University of Bergen, Norway. The centre is formed in cooperation with Witwatersrand University, Royal Holloway University of London, Université de Bordeaux, Eberhard Karls Universität Tübingen and UNI research, Bergen, Norway. The aim is to follow an even broader multi-disciplinary approach, and the 10-year programme include cognitive studies, neuroscience, geoscience, climate modelling and reconstruction, fauna etc.

== Site description ==
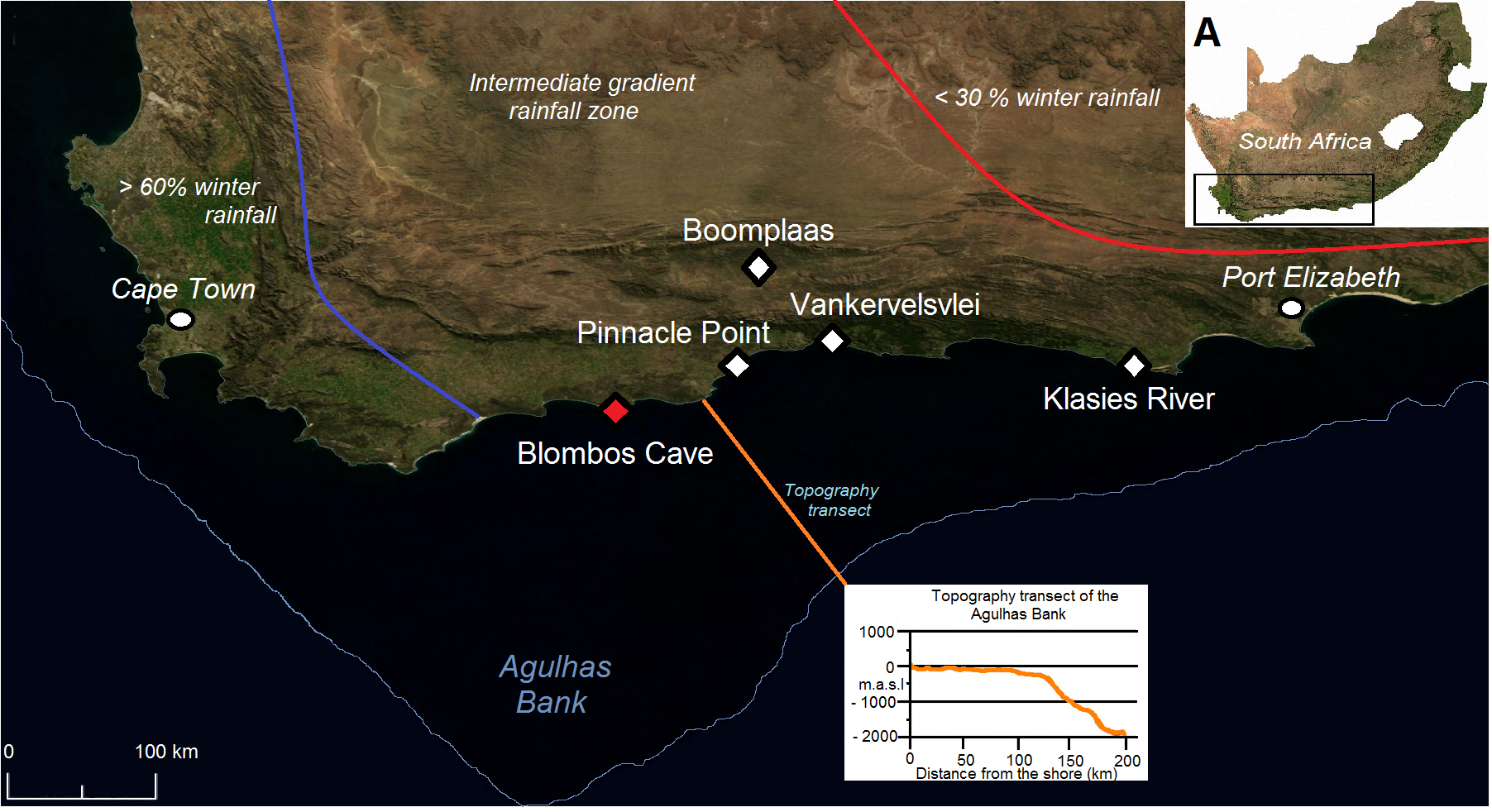
Blombos Cave location

The cave is in a south-facing cliff face 34.5 meters above sea level, ca. 100 meters from the present-day shoreline. The cave formation is set in calcretes of the Wankoe Formation, and the geological setting indicates that the cave was formed by wave action sometime during the Plio-Pleistocene.

The interior of Blombos Cave consists of a single main chamber, and the entire (accessible) interior cave floor is about 39 m^{2} behind the drip line. West of the cave's main chamber, the anthropogenic deposit extends inwardly 3–5 meters. In this area, however, the cave ceiling lowers to a point where it falls in level with the surface, preventing access to the deposit beneath. In the area north-east of the main chamber, the deposit expands into a low laying ante-chamber of unknown extent due to the sand filling it. By the end of the 2011 field season about 19.5 m^{2} of interior cave has been dug during the Blombos Cave excavations.

Blombos Cave's outer talus forms a gently sloping platform of about 23 m^{2} that extends 4–5 meters southwards, before the terrain abruptly drops down towards the shoreline that lies some 34.5 meters below the cave entrance. The talus, which primarily consists of Middle Stone Age deposit, rock fall and unconsolidated sediments, is stabilized by an area of large, exposed blocks (14 m^{2}). At some stage – and in between the prehistoric occupation of the cave site – these blocks have fallen down from the rock face above, effectively preventing site erosion and allowing sediments to stabilize and accumulate in front of the cave's drip line.

Calcium carbonate (CaCO_{3}) rich ground water seeps in from the cave roof and percolates through the interior sediments, resulting in an alkaline environment with good preservation conditions. The excavated Middle Stone Age deposit in Blombos Cave consists of aeolian (wind-borne) dune sand, blown in through the cave entrance, and roof spall from the cave ceiling. Intermixed with these sandy matrices are decomposed marine and terrestrial faunal remains (fish, shellfish, egg shell, and animal bones) and organic material. Large combustion features, small basin-shaped hearths and carbonized horizons are recorded throughout the whole MSA sequence.

== Stratigraphy and dating ==
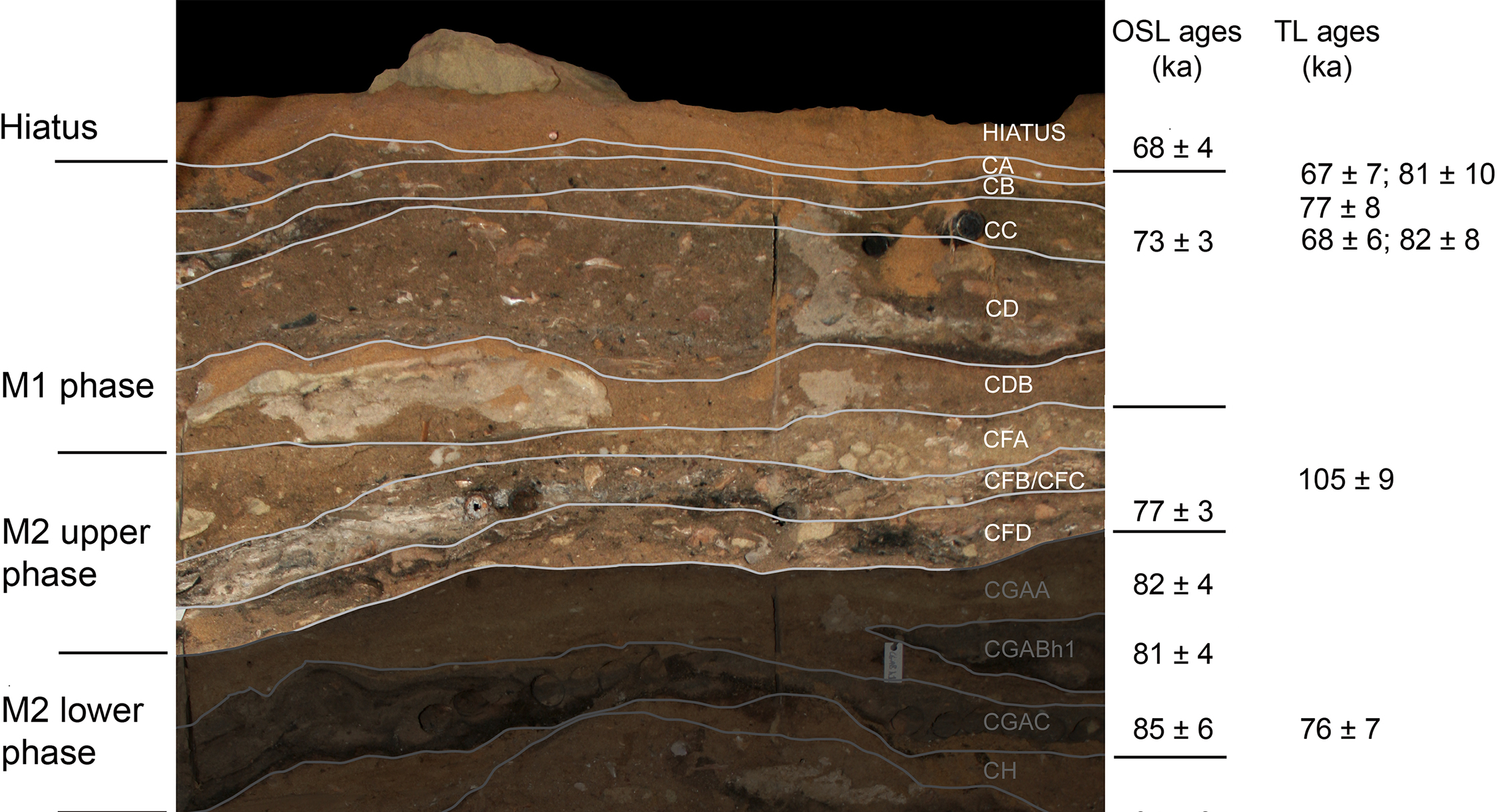
Blombos Cave stratigraphy

When the excavation started at Blombos Cave in 1992 the cave entrance was partially sealed by dune sand, and about 20 cm of sterile aeolian deposit covered the interior Later Stone Age deposit. Underneath the aeolian sand surface, seven main phases of occupation have been identified in the 2.5–3 meter deep Blombos Cave stratigraphic sequence, three in the Later Stone Age (L1–L3) and four in the Middle Stone Age (M1, Upper M2, Lower M2 and M3). These phases are further divided into finer lenses and sub-lenses, most of them less than 10 cm thick. The Later Stone Age and Middle Stone Age levels are separated by a 5–50 cm thick, sterile unit named 'Hiatus' or 'DUN'. The Hiatus consists of yellow aeolian sand that blew into the cave at about 68,000–70,000 years BP, and shows little disturbance from the overlying Later Stone Age units.

Humans have briefly and sporadically occupied Blombos Cave throughout the Middle Stone Age (101,000–70,000 years BP) and in the latter parts of the Later Stone Age (2,000–300 years BP). The occupational hiatus between ca. 68,000 and 2,000 years BP, combined with the geological evidence, indicates that the cave site was sealed off by aeolian sand during this period. The cave entrance appears to have reopened during the mid-Holocene transgression (c. 4,000–3000 years ago), when high sea levels eroded away most of the dune. Remnants of this eroded calcarenite dune are still visible in the surrounding coastal landscape.

The Later Stone Age sequence has been radiocarbon dated to 2000–290 years BP, while the Middle Stone Age sequence is dated to ca. 101,000–70,000 years ago through a number of methods, including: thermoluminescence (TL), optically stimulated luminescence (OSL), uranium-thorium series (U/Th) and electron spin resonance (ESR). The lowest levels of the M3 phase has a preliminary age of greater than 130,000 years ago, while the unexcavated sediments below these levels remain undated (June 2013).

=== Dating the Middle Stone Age sequence (detailed review) ===
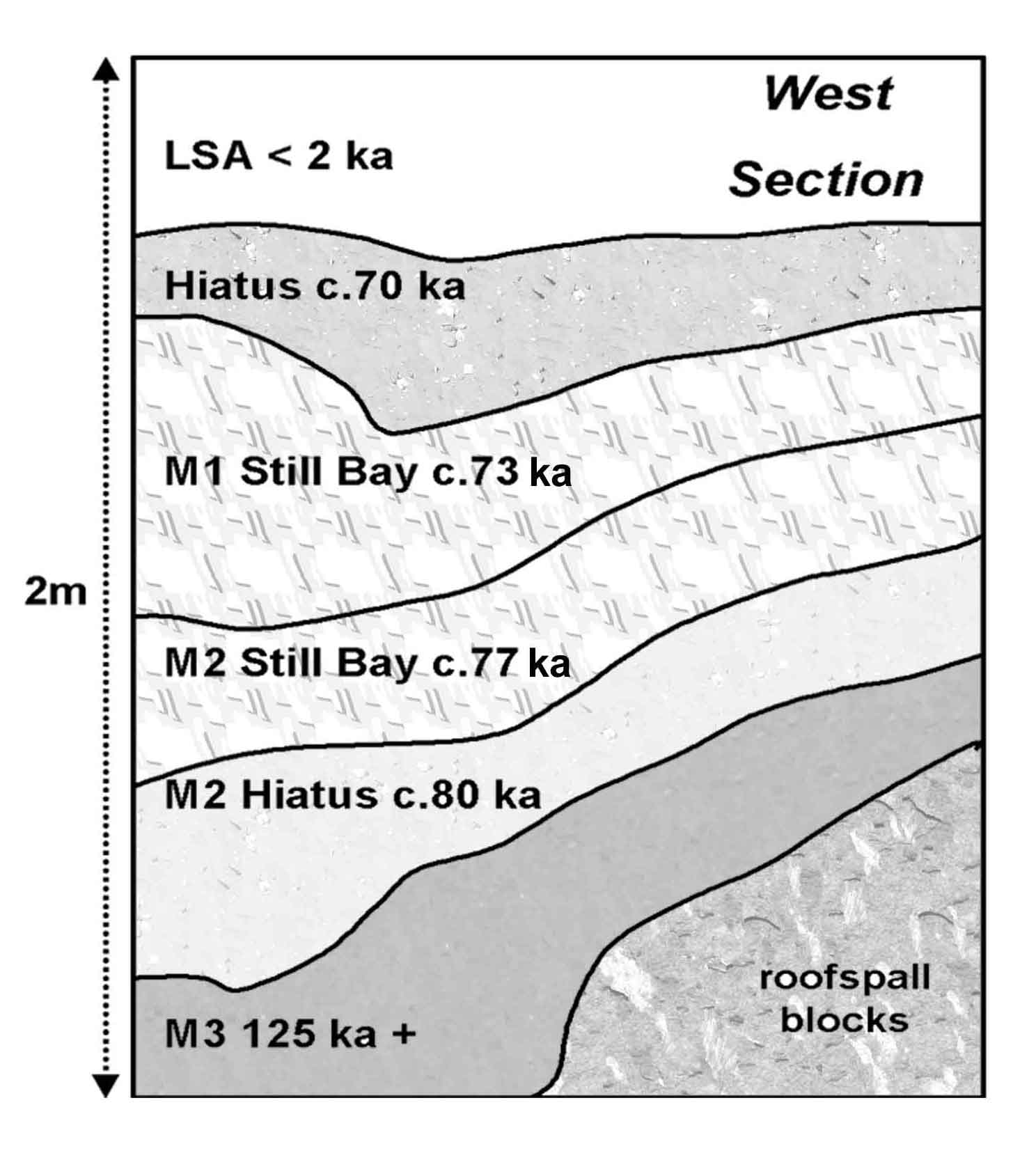
Stratigraphy of Blombos Cave.

The hiatus level (DUN) composed of undisturbed aeolian sand overlying the M1 phase is dated by OSL to 69,000 ± 5,000 and 70,000 ± 5000 years BP, while OSL ages ranging from 74,900 ± 4,300 to 72,500 ± 4,600 years BP have been obtained for the upper part of the M1 phase, i.e. the units associated with the Still Bay techno-tradition. Jacobs et al. 2013 consider the Still Bay sequence at Blombos Cave (with 95% confidence) to have begun only after 75,500 years BP and ended 67,800 years ago, lasting no longer than 6,600 years. The true age of the Still Bay has been debated, and ages presented by Jacobs et al. 2013 has been challenged on methodological grounds (see next paragraphs). TL ages for the M1 phase are 74,000 ± 5,000 and 78,000 ± 6,000 years BP.

The lower layers in the M2 phase (layer CG, CGAA, CGAB, CGAC) have been dated to between 78,900 ± 5,900 and 78,800 ± 5,600 years BP. The upper levels of the M3 phase are dated to ca. 100,000 years ago, coinciding with the high sea-level stand during Marine Isotope Stage (MIS) 5c. A preliminary age of >130,000 years BP is attributed to the lower M3 phase (the lowest excavated level at the site).

Critical remarks were in 2013 raised towards the luminescence-based Middle Stone Age chronology established by Jacobs et al. 2008 on methodological grounds related to errors in the manipulation of the luminescence data and estimation of uncertainties in the dose rates. The Middle Stone Age chronology for Blombos Cave derived from optically stimulated luminescence (OSL) ages is, nonetheless, consistent with the ages obtained through alternative methods (TL, ESR, U/Th), and remains uncontested.

== Archaeological remains and material culture from the Middle Stone Age levels ==
=== Still Bay bifacial points ===
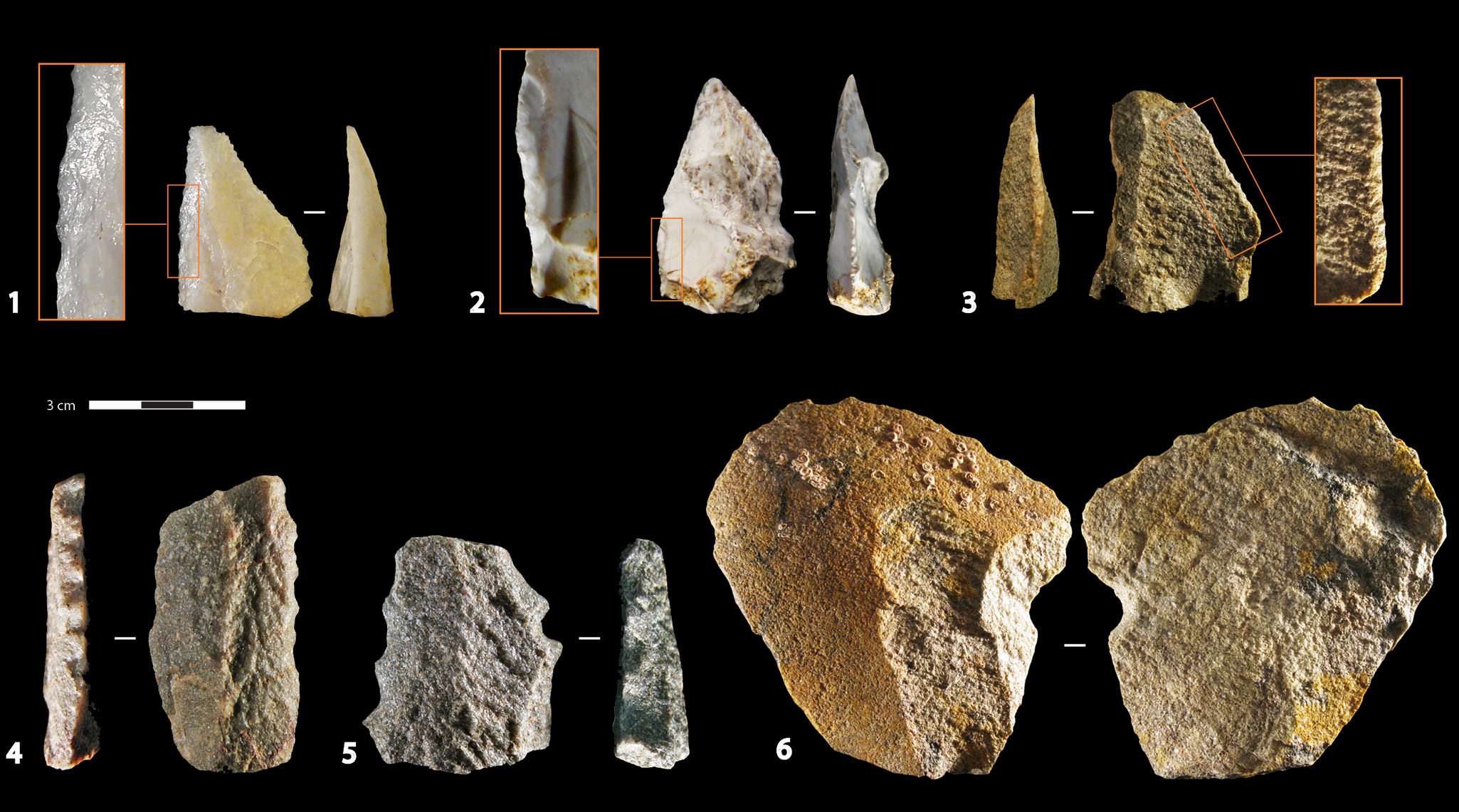
Lithic Industries of early Homo sapiens at Blombos Cave (M3 phase, MIS 5), Southern Cape, South Africa (c. 105 – 90 Ka)

The most extensive and well-documented sample of so-called Still Bay points in southern Africa comes from the Still Bay sequence in the Blombos Cave. Still Bay points are the fossiles directeurs of the Still Bay techno-complex, and they conform to bifacially worked stone points, popularly referred to as "lance-heads", "laurel leaf-shaped" or "willow leaf-shaped" stone points. Still Bay points have bifacially retouched sides, are elliptic to lanceolate shaped and most often they have two pointed apices.

Since the excavation in Blombos Cave began, more than 500 points or point fragments have been recovered, of which 352 have been described in detail. The dominant raw material used for Still Bay point production in Blombos Cave is silcrete (72%), followed by quartzite (15%) and quartz (13%). Whereas the quartzite and quartz raw material is easily available in close vicinity to the cave, the exact source for silcrete has not been established. It is speculated that it may come from outcrops in Riversdale or Albertinia – some 30 km away – or from now underwater sources. Approximately 90% of the Still Bay points recovered from Blombos Cave have been classified as "production rejects", and preliminary analysis of the lithic material from the 'CC' unit suggests that the majority of the lithic debitage are by-products of bifacial point manufacture. Villa et al. (2009:458) conclude that: Blombos was a workshop in the sense that the making of points was a primary – though not exclusive – activity at the site.

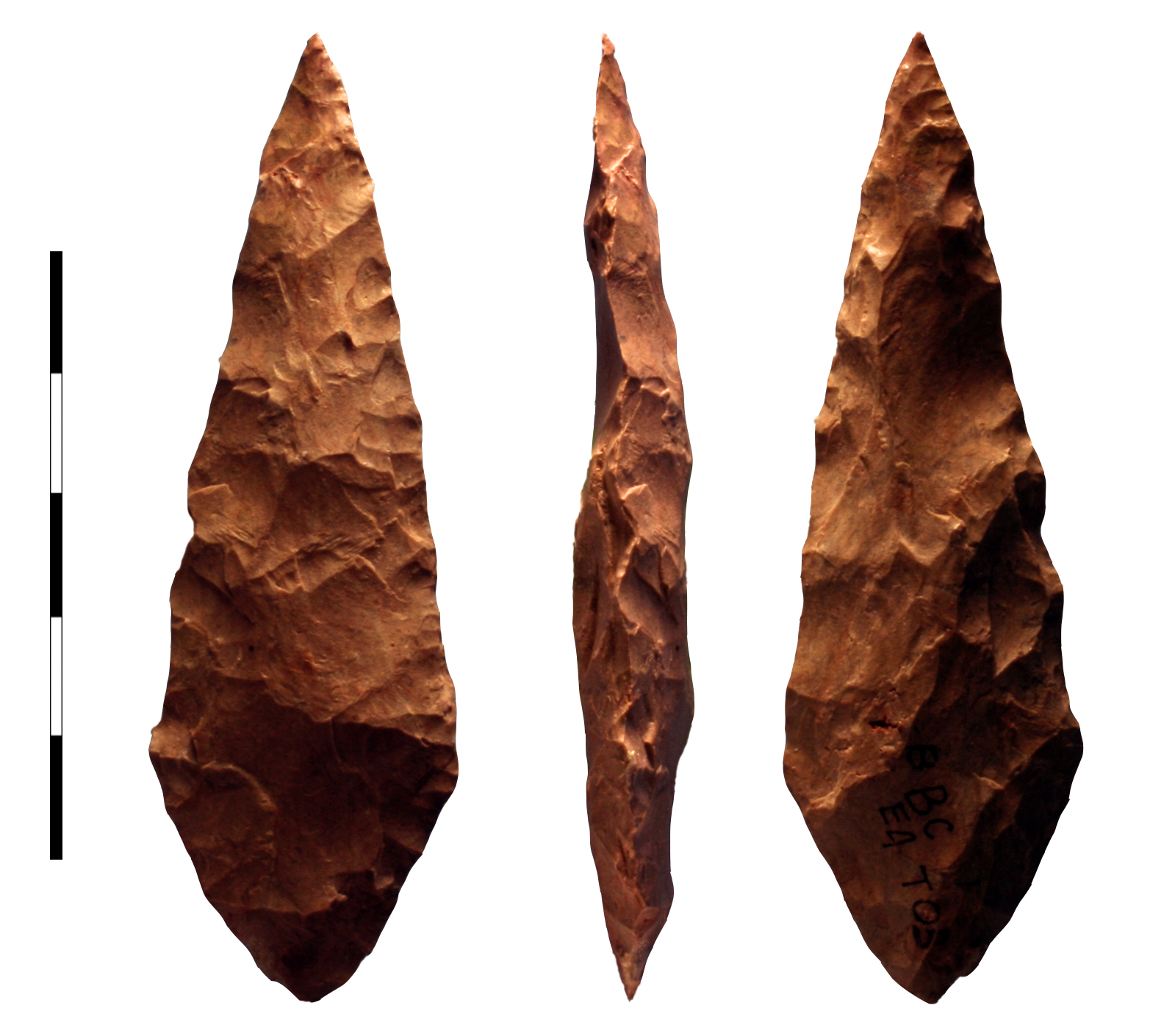
Bifacial silcrete point from M1 phase (71,000 BCE) layer of Blombos Cave, South Africa

The manufacture sequence of Still Bay points has been divided into four main production phases. While hard hammer and direct percussion was used in the initial reduction phase (phase 1), followed by soft hammer and marginal percussion (phase 2), pressure flaking was only used during the final retouch phase (3), and a few points were also reworked by hard hammer percussion (phase 4). The Still Bay points from Blombos Cave represent some of the earliest evidence for pressure flaking, a technique more common in considerably more recent lithic techno-complexes. Experimental replication by Mourre et al. 2010 and microscopic study of Still Bay points from Blombos Cave indicate that some silcrete blanks were deliberately heat-treated, before pressure flaking was employed in the final reduction sequence, and thus improving the silcrete's flaking quality.

It has been argued that the bifacial points were hafted and used primarily as spear points or knives or both. Some researchers have suggested that the seeming concern for the appearance of the finished point may represent evidence for social and stylistic elaboration during the MSA. Still Bay points may have served as tools with symbolic values attached to them – perhaps used as markers of identity – and integrated in social exchange networks, similar to the ones observed ethnographically. Högberg and Larsson 2011 hypothesise that blanks and unfinished Still Bay points were purposely left behind in Hollow Rock Shelter, perhaps for use at a later stage or as an act of solidarity with other hunter-gatherer groups.

==== Earliest known rock drawing ====
In 2011, archeologists found small rock fragment among spear points and other excavated material. After extensive testing for seven years, it was revealed that the nine red lines drawn on the rock were handmade and from an ochre crayon dating back 73,000 years. This makes it the oldest known abstract rock drawing. The geometrical markings are an astonishing example of a very early creative behavior. According to the research published in the journal Nature, the find was "a prime indicator of modern cognition" in our species and an ochre crayon was used by early African Homo sapiens inscribed onto the stone.

"The abrupt termination of all lines on the fragment edges indicates that the pattern originally extended over a larger surface," said archaeologist and lead author of the study Christopher Henshilwood.

=== Pigments and engraved pieces of ochre ===
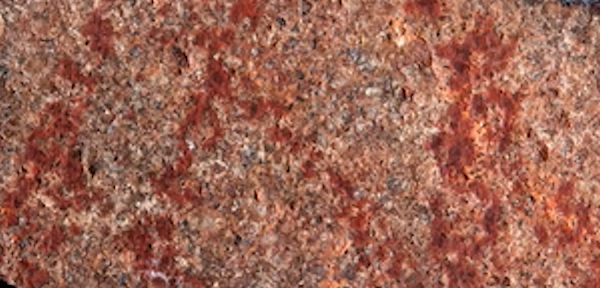
Claimed "Oldest known drawing by human hands", discovered in Blombos Cave in South Africa. Estimated to be 73,000 years old.

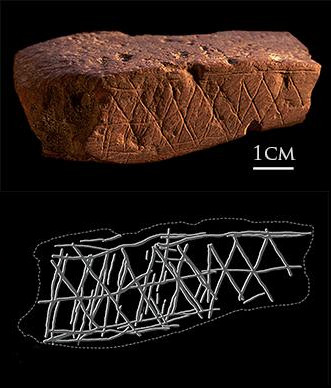
Possible rock art, Blombos cave.

Ochre – an iron-rich mineral – is regularly found at Stone Age sites throughout southern Africa, and has also been recovered from the Middle Stone Age levels in Blombos Cave. More than 8,000 pieces of ochre-like material, of which more than 1500 are 10 mm or more in length, have been recovered from the Middle Stone Age levels of Blombos Cave. Many of them show use-wear traces from intentional use and processing. Some of these recovered ochre pieces have been deliberately engraved or incised and it is argued that they represent a kind of early abstract or symbolic depiction and is arguably among the most complex and clearly formed of objects claimed to be early abstract representations.

In 2002 the recovery of two finely engraved ochre pieces – both deriving from the Still Bay units (M1 phase) – was reported in Science Magazine. The surfaces of both pieces were intentionally modified by scraping and grinding, and the engraved pattern formed a distinct cross-hatched design in combination with parallel incised lines. In 2009, six additional pieces of engraved ochre – this time recovered from entire Middle Stone Age sequence dated to between 70,000 and 100,000 years old – were announced. Comparable geometric designs have also been observed on an engraved bone fragment from Blombos Cave M1 phase. Engraved ochre has also been reported from other Middle Stone Age sites, such as Klein Kliphuis, Wonderwerk Cave and Klasies River Cave 1. Arguably, these engraved pieces of ochre represent – together with the engraved ostrich egg shells from Diepkloof – the earliest forms of abstract representation and conventional design tradition hitherto recorded.

Geometric or iconographic representations have traditionally been archaeological categories associated with modern human behaviour and cognitive complexity. Evidence for abstract representations is well documented in Europe after 40,000 years ago, and for a long time it was therefore thought that the earliest form of art originated there. The evidence from Blombos Cave – and from sites like Klasies River, Diepkloof Rock Shelter, Klein Kliphuis and Wonderwerk cave – implies that abstract representations were made in southern Africa at least 30,000 years earlier than in Europe and that stylistic elaboration and symbolic traditions were common in southern Africa 70,000–100,000 years ago. The incised ochre pieces recovered from Blombos Cave and various other Middle Stone Age sites indicates that there was a spatial and temporal continuity in the production and use of conventional symbols in the region.

The soft, iron-rich ochre would have been ground to powder and turned into a reddish paint, perhaps for cave or body painting. Shell beads and bone tools found alongside the ochre stones support the idea that the early humans using this cave were interested in ornamentation.

Yet, recent studies also demonstrate that the mere occurrence of ochre in MSA contexts cannot be limited to a symbolic interpretation alone, but its use may also have served some functional role, e.g. as an ingredient in mastic, skin protection against sun or insects, as soft-hammers for delicate knapping, as a hide preservative or as medicine.

=== Ochre processing workshop ===
In 2008 an ochre processing workshop consisting of two toolkits was uncovered in the 100,000-year-old levels at Blombos Cave, South Africa. Analysis shows that a liquefied pigment-rich mixture was produced and stored in the shells of two Haliotis midae (abalone), and that ochre, bone, charcoal, grindstones, and hammer-stones also formed a composite part of the toolkits. As both toolkits were left in situ, and as there are few other archaeological remains in the same layer, it seems the site was used primarily as a workshop and was abandoned shortly after the pigment-rich compounds were made. Dune sand then blew into the cave from the outside, encapsulated the toolkits and by happenstance ensured their preservation before the next occupants arrived, possibly several decades or centuries later.

The application or use of the compound is not self-evident. No resins or wax were detected that might indicate it was an adhesive for hafting. Possible uses could include painting a surface in order to decorate or protect it, or to create a design. The recovery of these toolkits at Blombos Cave nevertheless adds evidence for early technological and behavioural developments associated with Middle Stone Age humans. It documents the first known instance for the deliberate planning, production and curation of a pigmented compound and for the use of a container. Evidence for the complexity of the task includes procuring and combining raw materials from various sources (implying they had a mental template of the process they would follow), possibly using pyrotechnology to facilitate fat extraction from bone, using a probable recipe to produce the compound, and the use of shell containers for mixing and storage for later use. An elementary knowledge of chemistry and the ability for long-term planning suggests conceptual and cognitive abilities previously unknown for this time and serves as a benchmark during the early evolution of the technological and cognitive abilities of Homo sapiens in southern Africa.

=== Bone tools ===
Formal bone tools are relatively rare artefacts to find at MSA sites. At Blombos Cave several bone tools, including awls and bone points, have been recovered from both the Later Stone Age and Middle Stone Age sequence. More than thirty bone tools, e.g. awls and polished bone points, have been attributed to the Still Bay units. The awls that have been recovered are primarily made on long-bone shaft fragments, are shaped by scraping and may have been used to pierce through soft material – such as leather – or shell beads. Some of the bone points, which may have been used as projectile points and hafted, were besides being scraped also carefully polished in the final production phase of the tool. It has been questioned whether the polish have improved the bone tools' functionality, and it has been hypothesized the polish might represent a technique applied deliberately to primarily enhance the bone points' aesthetic quality and to give them 'added value'. The polished bone points may have formed part of a material culture exchange system amongst groups to maintain or even enhance social relations, perhaps similar to the stone point exchange systems observed ethnographically. The behavioural and evolutionary significance of prehistoric bone shaping is, however, not entirely clear and has been – and still is – critically examined and discussed by academics.

In addition to conventional bone tools, a modified bone fragment marked with eight parallel lines has also been recovered from the Still Bay phase. The bone incisions do not look like ordinary butchery marks. Microscopic analysis shows that the incisions most likely represent a deliberately engraved pattern made with a stone tool, and it may be comparable with the geometric design observed on the engraved pieces of ochre.

=== Nassarius kraussianus marine shell beads ===
More than 70 marine shell beads of the sea snail species Nassarius kraussianus have been found in the M1 and Upper M2 phases at Blombos Cave. The beads are exclusively confined to the Still Bay occupation units, and the majority have been found in the M1 phase. It has been argued that the marine shells were deliberately pierced through the aperture, probably with a bone tool, thus creating of a small-sized perforation. Contextual information, morphometric, technological and use-wear analysis of the Blombos Cave beads, alongside experimental reproduction of wear patterns, show that the Nassarius kraussianus shells were strung, perhaps on cord or sinew and worn as a personal ornament. A cluster of 24 perforated Nassarius kraussianus has been recovered from one of the Still Bay units and strengthens this interpretation, as it appears that these shells originated from a single beadwork. Beside the deliberate perforation of the Nassarius shells, repeated rubbing of the beads against one another and against the cord, have resulted in discrete use wear facets on each bead that are not observed on these shells in their natural environment. These use-wear patterns are the principal factor that defines the shells as beads. Also, the consistency in shell size and colour indicates that the Nassarius shells were carefully selected. Ochre has been detected inside some of the shell beads, implying that they were subject to deliberate or indirect use of ochre as a colouring agent.

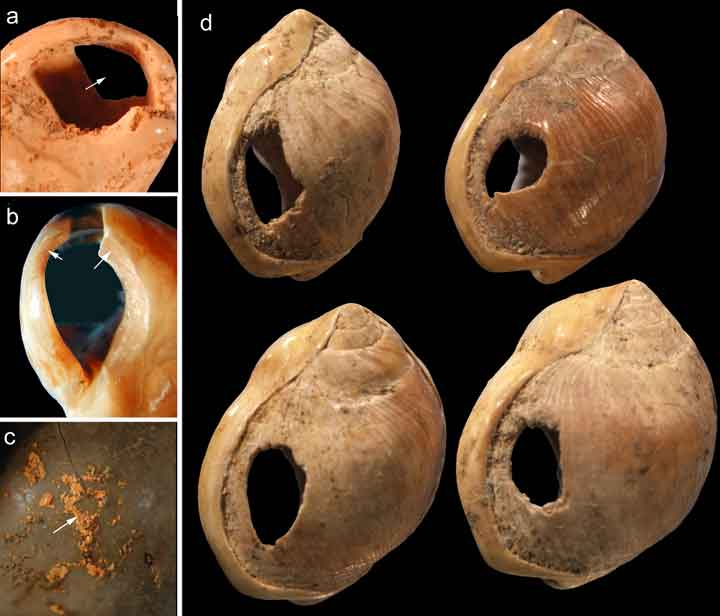
Blombos Cave shell beads

The wearing and display of personal ornaments during the Still Bay phase was not idiosyncratic. In-depth analyses of the Blombos Cave shell beads deriving from various levels and squares within the site demonstrate chronological regularities and variability, in terms of manufacture, stringing method and design of the bead works. Discrete groups of beads with wear patterns and colouring specific to that group have been recovered, a patterning that suggests that at least a number of individuals may have worn beads, perhaps on their person or attached to clothing or other artifacts. Thus, the Blombos Cave beads may document one of the first examples where changes in complex social conventions directly can be traced through distinct variations in the production and use of symbolic material culture over time.

The shell beads also provide insights into technological and behavioral aspects of the humans living in the Still Bay phase, including the ability to drill, the use of cord or gut for threading and the probable tying of knots to secure the beads. A comprehension of self-awareness or self-recognition is implied by the wearing of beads or other personal ornaments and was likely an important factor in cognitive evolution that was selected for long before the introduction of beads. Further, syntactical language would have been essential for the sharing and transmission of the symbolic meaning of personal ornaments within and between groups and also over generations, as is also suggested for the engraved ochre pieces.

Until recently, the first use of personal ornaments was thought to occur with the arrival of Homo sapiens in Europe, some 40,000 years ago. Most academics now believe that marine shells were used as beads in the Near East, North Africa, and Sub-Saharan Africa at least 30,000 years earlier than their first use in Europe. Besides Blombos Cave, there are a number of African and Middle East sites that all have yielded strong evidence for the early use of personal ornaments: Skul and Qafzeh, Israel, Oued Djebbana, Algeria, Grotte des Pigeons, Rhafas, Ifri n'Ammar and Contrebandiers, Morocco.

=== Human remains ===
No skeletal remains have been found in Blombos Cave and the amount of other types of recovered human material from the Middle Stone Age units amounts only to seven teeth. The crown diameters of at least some of these teeth are morphometric "modern" in terms of tooth size reduction, implying that the humans occupying Blombos Cave were anatomically modern. This conclusion is supported by similar evidence from a nearby archaeological site, Klasies River Caves, that dates to a similar time period.

=== Faunal remains ===
At Blombos Cave a great variety of terrestrial and marine faunal remains are consistently found throughout the Later Stone Age and Middle Stone age phases. The faunal record from Blombos Cave shows that Middle Stone Age people practiced a subsistence strategy that included a very broad range of animals. This means they were able to hunt large animals, such as eland, but also gathered, collected or trapped small animals such as tortoises, hyraxes and dune mole rats. They also brought seal, dolphin and probably whale meat back to the cave. The latter two were almost certainly scavenged from beach wash-ups, but seals may have been speared or clubbed.

The faunal remains recovered include specifically: fish, shellfish, birds, tortoise and ostrich egg shell, and mammals of various sizes. The amount of shellfish recovered from the various Middle Stone Age units show that people were regularly collecting them at the shore and bringing them back to the cave for consumption. Common species include the giant periwinkle (Turbo sarmaticus), limpets (Patella spp.), and brown mussels (Perna perna).

Species variations may, with larger sample sizes, inform us of past changes in ocean palaeo-temperatures. In terms of kilograms of shellfish per cubic meter (kg/m^{3}), Still Bay is the Middle Stone Age phase in Blombos Cave where shellfish are found in least abundance (17.5 kg/m^{3}), and they seem to have been more intensively exploited in the earlier occupation phases. The changes observed in shellfish procurement through the various MSA phases may relate to fluctuating climatic conditions and changing sea levels, which have altered the cave's proximity to the coastline and affected the sea level temperatures.

Fish remains are present, but not abundant, in all phases at Blombos Cave. Fish are more abundant in the Later Stone Age but a wider range of species are present in the Middle Stone Age sequence. Chemical analysis of fish bone from the Later Stone Age and Middle Stone Age levels, using the carbon/nitrogen method, confirms the antiquity of the Middle Stone Age specimens. Most of the species present are not known to wash up after cold water upwelling events, hence scavenging of wash-ups was not the primary source of fish. No artefacts that appear to be obvious fishing equipment have been found, but the range and sizes of species present indicate that a number of methods must have been employed. These may have included: baited hooks, spearing and tidal traps.

Where the same fish species have survived in both Later Stone Age and Middle Stone Age levels, analysis of relative bone element occurrence show a significant deficit in the Middle Stone Age. In other words, age-related taphonomic processes have resulted in the loss of many fish bones, and it is likely that more fish were originally deposited in the Middle Stone Age levels than have been recovered through archaeological excavations. Fish are seldom reported from other southern African MSA sites, and by implication, it was thought that Middle Stone Age people were incapable of exploiting coastal resources efficiently. The evidence for fishing at Blombos Cave and Klasies River contradicts this theory.

The huge variety of faunal and the shellfish remains recovered from all parts of the Blombos Cave Middle Stone Age sequence demonstrate that people during this period practiced a diverse set of subsistence and procurements strategies and were able to effectively hunt, trap and collect coastal, as well as terrestrial, resources. The subsistence behaviour inferred from the faunal assemblages can hardly be distinguished from the remains and behaviour seen in more recent Later Stone Age contexts. Thus, the overall subsistence pattern at Blombos Cave signifies that no clear distinction can be made between Later Stone Age and Middle Stone Age subsistence behaviour at the site.

== Palaeoenvironment ==
Episodes of past environmental change are typically defined by marine oxygen isotope stages (MIS) that are derived from oxygen isotope signals in planktonic foraminifera found in marine cores. The climatic fluctuations documented from MIS 6 through to MIS 3 spans the duration of the southern African MSA. These stages are therefore most pertinent. In the archaeological context, environmental proxies typically come from a broad range of sources such as microfauna, macrofauna, fossil pollen, dune sediments and speleothems. In recent years, there has been a growing interest in improving our understanding of the environments in which MSA peoples lived and interacted with each other. This is because aspects of MSA behaviours related to artefact production, subsistence, pigment use and migration patterns are increasingly being linked to periods of climatic, and by extension environmental change.

Establishing a link, if any, between MSA lifeways and the environmental context in which MSA behaviours developed is complex. While some researchers argue for links between extreme climate change and social change there is some debate. The differing views regarding the role of past environmental change on Middle Stone Age people is also complicated by the wide range of climate proxies which can be interpreted at varying spatial and temporal resolutions. The aim of current research efforts focusing on MSA environments is therefore two-fold. Firstly, improving the temporal resolution of proxies by applying suitable dating methods such as radiocarbon, uranium-series, luminescence, etc. Secondly and most importantly, is to refine the available proxy database so that ambiguous and often, conflicting interpretations can be re-assessed as new information emerges. In light of this, two key studies have emerged, Jacobs and Roberts who evaluate and synthesise the dates for the Still Bay and Howiesons Poort periods across southern Africa and Chase who addresses the issues about MIS 4 environments and the role of climate forcing during this period. A current synthesis of environmental proxy evidence associated with MIS 4 indicates that the Still Bay and Howiesons Poort occurred during relatively humid conditions. It is however not clear what environmental conditions during earlier periods of the MSA (i.e. MSA I, II, III & MSA 2) were like. These early MSA periods are broadly correlated with MIS 6 and MIS 5 (b, c, d, e) but have not been investigated in any detail.

== Provincial Heritage Site ==
Blombos Cave was declared a provincial heritage site by Heritage Western Cape on 29 May 2015 in terms of Section 27 of the National Heritage Resources Act. This gives the site Grade II status and provides it with protection under South African heritage law.

Also in 2015, the South African government submitted a proposal to add the cave to the list of World Heritage Sites and it has been placed on the list of tentative sites as a potential future 'serial nomination' together with Pinnacle Point, Sibudu Cave, Klasies River Caves, Border Cave and Diepkloof Rock Shelter.

== See also ==
- Behavioral modernity
- Boomplaas Cave
- Enkapune Ya Muto
- Howieson's Poort Shelter
- Behavioral modernity
- List of caves in South Africa
- List of Stone Age art
- Prehistoric art
- Symbolic culture
- Cognitive revolution
- Timeline of evolution
- Timeline of historic inventions

== Further reading and media productions ==
=== Publications in peer-reviewed journals and books ===
- Henshilwood, C. & d'Errico, F. (editors). 2011. Homo symbolicus: The dawn of language, imagination and spirituality. Amsterdam, Benjamins.
- Henshilwood, C. S. 2008. Holocene prehistory of the southern Cape, South Africa: excavations at Blombos Cave and the Blombosfontein Nature Reserve. BAR S1860, Cambridge: Cambridge Monographs in African Archaeology 75: 1- 171. Publications in peer-reviewed journals and books
- Henshilwood, C.S. & Lombard, M. 2013. Becoming human: Archaeology of the sub-Saharan Middle Stone Age. In: Renfrew, C. & Bahn, P.(eds.) The Cambridge World Prehistory, Volume 1. Cambridge: Cambridge University Press.
- Henshilwood, C.S. 2013. Origins of symbolic behaviour. In: McGraw-Hill Yearbook of Science & Technology. California, McGraw-Hill.
- Dubreuil, B. & Henshilwood, C.S. 2013. Archeology and the language-ready brain. Language & Cognition 5 (2/3).
- Henshilwood, C. S. 2012. The Still Bay and Howiesons Poort: 'Palaeolithic' techno-traditions in southern Africa. Journal of World Prehistory 25:205–237.
- Henshilwood, C., & Dubreuil, B. 2012. Response to Shea. Current Anthropology53 (1):1–3.
- d'Errico, F., Vanhaeren, M., Henshilwood, C., Lawson, G., Maureille, B., Gambier, D., Tillier, A. Soressi, M & van Niekerk, K. 2009. From the origin of language to the diversification of languages: What can archaeology and palaeoanthropology say? In F. d'Errico & J.-M. Hombert (eds.), Becoming Eloquent: Advances in the emergence of language, human cognition, and modern cultures. Amsterdam: John Benjamins Publishing Company: 13–68.
- Henshilwood, C.S. 2009. The origins of symbolism, spirituality & shamans: exploring Middle Stone Age material culture in South Africa. In Becoming human: innovation in prehistoric material and spiritual cultures, (eds. C. Renfrew & I. Morley), Cambridge, Cambridge University Press: 29–49.
- Henshilwood, C.S. & Dubreuil, B. 2009. Reading the artefacts: Gleaning language skills from the Middle Stone Age in southern Africa. In: (eds. R. Botha & C. Knight), The Cradle of Language, Oxford: Oxford University Press: 41–60 .
- Henshilwood, C.S. 2008. Winds of change: palaeoenvironments, material culture and human behaviour in the Late Pleistocene (c. 77 – 48 ka) in the Western Cape Province, South Africa. South African Archaeological Bulletin, Goodwin volume, Current Themes in Middle Stone Age Research 10: 35–51.
- Henshilwood, C.S. 2007. Fully symbolic sapiens behaviour: Innovation in the Middle Stone Age at Blombos Cave, South Africa. In: Rethinking the Human Revolution: New Behavioural and Biological Perspectives on the Origins and Dispersal of Modern Humans,. (eds.C. Stringer & P. Mellars), MacDonald Institute Research Monograph series: Cambridge, University of Cambridge Press: 123–132 1.
- Henshilwood, C.S. 2006. Modern humans and symbolic behaviour: Evidence from Blombos Cave, South Africa. In Origins (ed. G. Blundell). Cape Town: Double Storey: 78–83
- Henshilwood, C.S. 2004. The Origins of Modern Human Behaviour – Exploring the African evidence. In Combining the Past and the Present: Archaeological perspectives on society. Edited by Terje Oestegaard, Nils Anfinset and Tore Saetersdal. BAR *International Series 1210: 95–106.
- Henshilwood, C.S. 1997 Identifying the collector: Evidence for human consumption of the Cape dune mole-rat, Bathyergus suillus, from Blombos Cave, southern Cape, South Africa. Journal of Archaeological Science 24:659–662.
- Henshilwood, C. S. 1996. A revised chronology for the arrival of pastoralism in southernmost Africa: new evidence of sheep at ca. 2000 b.p. from Blombos Cave, South Africa. Antiquity 70:945–949.
- Henshilwood, C.S., Nilssen, P. & Parkington, J. 1994. Mussel drying and food storage in the Late Holocene, sw Cape, South Africa. Journal of Field Archaeology 21:103–109.
- Lombard, M., et al. (2012) South African and Lesotho Stone Age sequence updated. South African Archaeological Bulletin.

=== Popular articles ===
- Henshilwood, C. & van Niekerk, K. 2012. Middle Stone Age Chemists: A 100,000 Year Old Pigment Processing Workshop at Blombos Cave, South Africa. The Digging Stick.
- Tollefson, Jeff 2012. Human evolution: Cultural roots. Nature: News Feature.
- Voght, Henrik 2012. Her så vi lyset. Aftenposten A-magasinet.

=== Television 2008–2013 (selected sample) ===
- 2013 – CNN Inside Africa: African beads rewrite the human story?
- 2012 – NHK Japanese Television Special Human Series. Presenter: Tatsuya Fujiwara narration (narrator): Seiko Nakajo
- 2010 – NHK Japanese Broadcasting Corporation: Film for TV made with Henshilwood at Blombos Cave
- 2010 – Film made at Cape Point Nature Reserve with Henshilwood on the 'Origins of H. sapiens' for Foster Brother Film Productions, South Africa.
- 2009 – TV film made with Henshilwood at Blombos Cave for the Swedish Broadcasting Society Directed by Martin Widman and presented by Lasse Berg
- 2008 – Film made at Blombos Cave with Henshilwood in March, 2008 for display in the 'Anne & Bernard Spitzer Hall of Human Origins', American Museum of Natural History, New York.
- 2008 – Film made at De Hoop Nature Reserve with Henshilwood directed by Alan Wilcox on Human Evolution in Africa. SABC Production.
