= Stilbaai Marine Protected Area =

Marine conservation area in the Western Cape in South Africa

- Stilbaai MPA location
- Location: Stilbaai, Western Cape province, South Africa
- Nearest city: Stilbaai
- Coordinates: 34°23′S 21°25′E
- Area: 20 km^{2} (7.7 sq mi)
- Established: 2008
- Governing body: CapeNature
- Stilbaai Marine Protected Area (South Africa)

The Stilbaai Marine Protected Area is an inshore conservation region in the territorial waters near Stilbaai on the south coast of the Western Cape province of South Africa.

== History ==
Stilbaai was declared a marine protected area in 2008. It is adjacent to the terrestrial Geelkrans Nature Reserve, which helps ensure that the coastal areas are well protected. The MPA is intended to help recovery of over-exploited reef line fish, to reduce habitat degradation to preserve archaeologically and culturally important fish traps.

The Stilbaai Marine Protected Area was proclaimed on 17 October 2008 in Government Notice No. 31517. The associated regulations regarding management were published in Government Notice No. 31516.

== Purpose ==
A marine protected area is defined by the IUCN as "A clearly defined geographical space, recognised, dedicated and managed, through legal or other effective means, to achieve the long-term conservation of nature with associated ecosystem services and cultural values".

This MPA was established with several goals in mind. While its general purpose is to protect the area and its wildlife, it is more specifically intended to help recover the populations of exploited fish and shellfish, to protect the Goukou estuary so it may be used as a nursery for local wildlife, and to control the activities taking place within the MPA to minimize habitat degradation. The preservation of vywers (pre-colonial South African fish traps made using boulders) is also a factor.

== Extent ==
The MPA protects 13.80 km (8.57 mi) of coastline, 5.7 km (3.5 mi) of the Goukou estuary, and 20 km^{2} (7.7 sq mi) of ocean.

=== Boundaries ===
The MPA is between Noordkapperspunt and Rietvleivywers, and includes the estuary of the Goukou River for 15 km (9.3 mi) upstream. The seaward boundaries are from S34°23.964′, E021°24.800′ at Noordkapperspunt to S34°23.964′, E021°30.976′ to S34°21.676′, E021°30.976' at Rietvleivywers. The shoreline boundary follows the high-water mark from Noordkapperspunt through the harbour, along the western shore of the estuary to 34°17.830′ 021°18.620, and back along the eastern shore to the mouth and from there to Rietvleivywers.

=== Zonation ===
There are three restricted zones in the MPA:

- The Geelkrans restricted zone is the part of the MPA east of E021°27.737', adjacent to the Geelkrans Nature Reserve and Rietvleivywers.
- The Skulpiesbaai restricted zone is the sea part of the MPA west of E021°24.970°
- The Goukou estuarine restricted zone is from S34°20.459′, E021°24.198′ to S34°17.830′, E021°18.620′

The rest of the MPA is a controlled zone.

== Management ==
The marine protected areas of South Africa are the responsibility of the national government, which has management agreements with a variety of MPA management authorities, in this case, CapeNature, which manages the MPA with funding from the SA Government through the Department of Environmental Affairs (DEA).

The Department of Agriculture, Forestry and Fisheries is responsible for issuing permits, quotas and law enforcement.

== Use ==
=== Activities requiring a permit ===
==== Fishing ====
Fishing is allowed in controlled areas subject to a permit, but it is banned in Geelkrans, Skulpiesbaai and Goukou estuary.

==== Scuba diving ====
Recreational scuba diving is authorised by permits issued under Section 43 of the Marine Living Resources Act. A business will require a scuba diving business permit to operate within MPA.

== Geography ==
The coastal area of Stilbaai lies south of the Southern Langeberg mountains, which are part of the Cape Fold Belt. The exposed geology is sediments of the Table Mountain Sandstone group and occasional outcrops of the older Malmesbury group. The drainage of these mountains includes the Goukou River and its estuary, which is in the MPA.

The climate of the region is in the transition zone between winter and year-round rainfall. Summer rain is orographic, with onshore south-easterly winds meeting the mountains. Winter rain is associated with sub-antarctic cold fronts and westerly winds. About 600 mm (24 in) rain falls mostly in spring and autumn. Temperatures range between 5 °C (41 °F) in winter and 30 °C (86 °F) in summer. During easterly winds coastal sea temperatures decrease, and increase during westerly winds as warmer offshore water is moved towards the coast.

== Ecology ==
Marine ecoregions of the South African Exclusive Economic Zone: Stilbaai Marine Protected Area is in the Agulhas ecoregion

(describe position, biodiversity and endemism of the region) The MPA is in the warm temperate Agulhas ecoregion to the east of Cape Point which extends eastwards to the Mbashe River. There are a large proportion of species endemic to South Africa along this coastline. This is a high biodiversity area, and has the coastal habitats include sandy beaches, rocky shores, dunes, coastal fynbos, salt-marshes, rocky reefs and estuarine reeds.

Four major habitats exist in the sea in this region, distinguished by the nature of the substrate. The substrate, or base material, is important in that it provides a base to which an organism can anchor itself, which is vitally important for those organisms which need to stay in one particular kind of place. Rocky shores and reefs provide a firm fixed substrate for the attachment of plants and animals. Some of these may have Kelp forests, which reduce the effect of waves and provide food and shelter for an extended range of organisms. Sandy beaches and bottoms are a relatively unstable substrate and cannot anchor kelp or many of the other benthic organisms. Finally there is open water, above the substrate and clear of the kelp forest, where the organisms must drift or swim. Mixed habitats are also frequently found, which are a combination of those mentioned above. There are no significant estuarine habitats in the MPA.

Rocky shores and reefs There are rocky reefs and mixed rocky and sandy bottoms. For many marine organisms the substrate is another type of marine organism, and it is common for several layers to co-exist. Examples of this are red bait pods, which are usually encrusted with sponges, ascidians, bryozoans, anemones, and gastropods, and abalone, which are usually covered by similar seaweeds to those found on the surrounding rocks, usually with a variety of other organisms living on the seaweeds.

Four littoral zones and their associated group of biota are present on the rocky shores. The Littorina zone its sea snails; the Upper Balanoid zone with winkles and limpets; lower Balanoid zone with brown mussels, coralline algae zoanthids at mid-tide level and the infratidal zone with anemones, sea urchins and starfish.

The type of rock of the reef is of some importance, as it influences the range of possibilities for the local topography, which in turn influences the range of habitats provided, and therefore the diversity of inhabitants. Sandstone and other sedimentary rocks erode and weather very differently, and depending on the direction of dip and strike, and steepness of the dip, may produce reefs which are relatively flat to very high profile and full of small crevices. These features may be at varying angles to the shoreline and wave fronts. There are fewer large holes, tunnels and crevices in sandstone reefs, but often many deep but low near-horizontal crevices.

Kelp forests Kelp forests are a variation of rocky reefs, as the kelp requires a fairly strong and stable substrate which can withstand the loads of repeated waves dragging on the kelp plants. The Sea bamboo Ecklonia maxima grows in water which is shallow enough to allow it to reach to the surface with its gas-filled stipes, so that the fronds form a dense layer at or just below the surface, depending on the tide. The shorter Split-fan kelp Laminaria pallida grows mostly on deeper reefs, where there is not so much competition from the sea bamboo. Both these kelp species provide food and shelter for a variety of other organisms, particularly the Sea bamboo, which is a base for a wide range of epiphytes, which in turn provide food and shelter for more organisms.

Sandy beaches and bottoms (including shelly, pebble and gravel bottoms) Sandy bottoms at first glance appear to be fairly barren areas, as they lack the stability to support many of the spectacular reef based species, and the variety of large organisms is relatively low. The sand is continually being moved around by wave action, to a greater or lesser degree depending on weather conditions and exposure of the area. This means that sessile organisms must be specifically adapted to areas of relatively loose substrate to thrive in them, and the variety of species found on a sandy or gravel bottom will depend on all these factors. Sandy bottoms have one important compensation for their instability, animals can burrow into the sand and move up and down within its layers, which can provide feeding opportunities and protection from predation. Other species can dig themselves holes in which to shelter, or may feed by filtering water drawn through the tunnel, or by extending body parts adapted to this function into the water above the sand.

The open sea The pelagic water column is the major part of the living space at sea. This is the water between the surface and the top of the benthic zone, where living organisms swim, float or drift, and the food chain starts with phytoplankton, the mostly microscopic photosynthetic organisms that convert the energy of sunlight into organic material which feeds nearly everything else, directly or indirectly. In temperate seas there are distinct seasonal cycles of phytoplankton growth, based on the available nutrients and the available sunlight. Either can be a limiting factor. Phytoplankton tend to thrive where there is plenty of light, and they themselves are a major factor in restricting light penetration to greater depths, so the photosynthetic zone tends to be shallower in areas of high productivity. Zooplankton feed on the phytoplankton, and are in turn eaten by larger animals. The larger pelagic animals are generally faster moving and more mobile, giving them the option of changing depth to feed or to avoid predation, and to move to other places in search of a better food supply.

The estuary The Goukou Estuary is one of the few permanently open estuaries on the southern coast, but the freshwater supply is very variable and progressively being reduced by upstream usage. The topography is constantly being altered by tides, wave action and changing river flow. After heavy rain the estuary is a strongly flowing muddy river, and when flow drops, sandbanks form at the river mouth. Eelgrass, and Zostera beds occur in the lower reaches of the estuary.

=== Marine species diversity ===
==== Animals ====
Mammals:

- Southern right whale

Birds:

- Red-knobbed coot
- Herons
- Cormorants
- Migratory waders in summer
- Terns
- Darters
- Egrets
- Ibis
- Spoonbill
- Hamerkop
- African oystercatcher

Fish:

- Kob
- White steenbras
- Stumpnose
- Elf
- Leervis
- Sharks
- Mullet
- Galjoen
- Bronze bream
- Roman
- Anguilla spp. (eels)
- Threadfin butterflyfish, Chaetodon auriga
- Coachman, Heniochus acuminatus
- Spot sergeant, Abudefduf sordidus
- Sergeant major, Abudefduf vaigiensis
- Spot-tail coris, Coris caudimacula

Invertebrates:

- Mud prawns
- Sand prawns
- Various molluscs
- Pansy shell

==== Endemism ====
The MPA is in the warm temperate Agulhas ecoregion to the east of Cape Point which extends eastwards to the Mbashe River. There are a large proportion of species endemic to South Africa along this coastline.

== See also ==
Marine protected areas of South Africa
- List of protected areas of South Africa
- Marine protected areas of South Africa – Protected areas of coastline or ocean in the EEZ of South Africa
