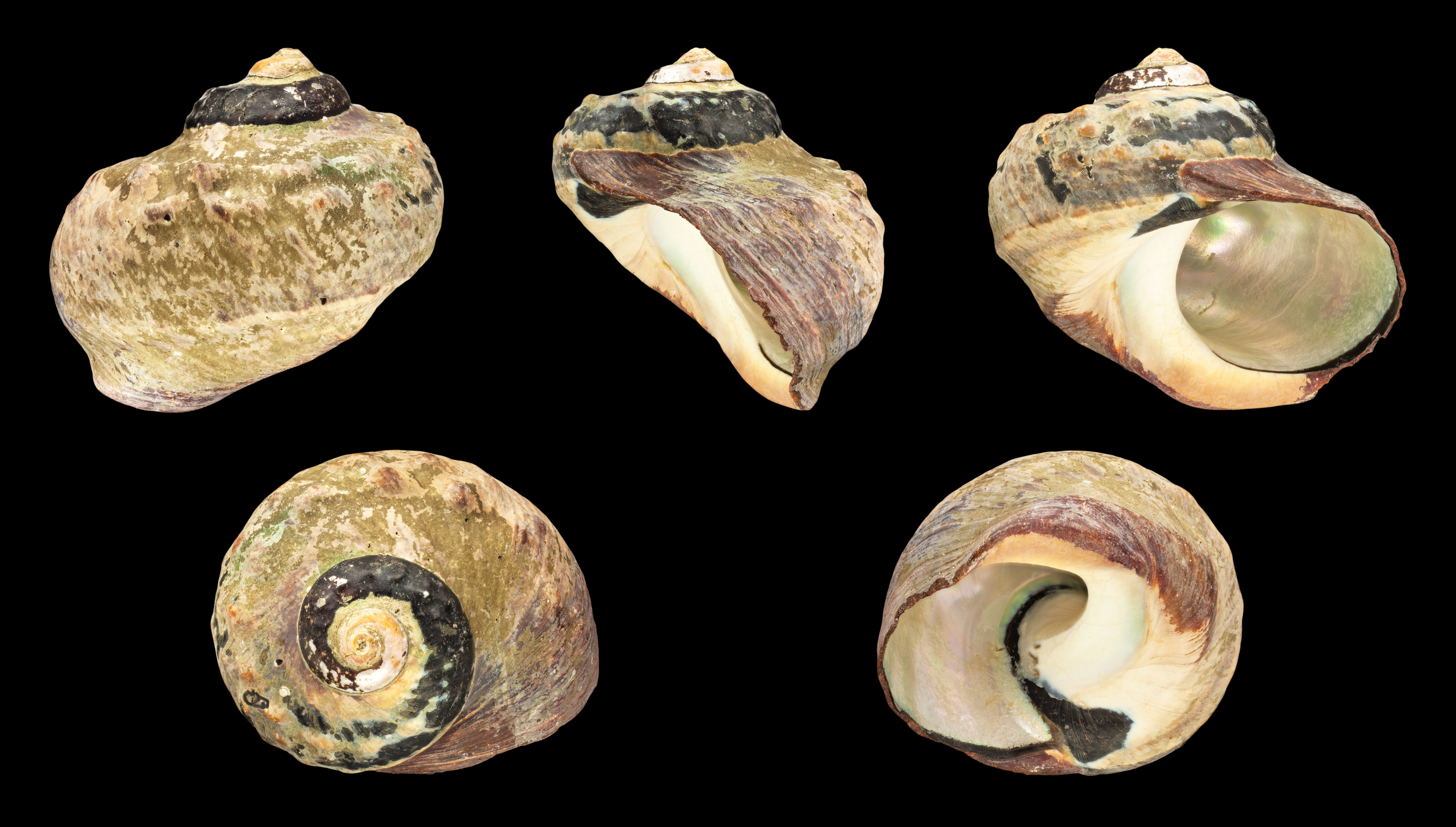
- A shell of Turbo sarmaticus

Scientific classification
- Kingdom: Animalia
- Phylum: Mollusca
- Class: Gastropoda
- Subclass: Vetigastropoda
- Order: Trochida
- Family: Turbinidae
- Genus: Turbo
- Species: T. sarmaticus

Binomial name
- Turbo sarmaticus Linnaeus, 1758

Synonyms
- Sarmaticus classarius Gray, 1850; Sarmaticus sarmaticus Linnaeus, 1758; Turbo classicarius J.E. Gray, 1850; Turbo pethiolatus Swainson, 1840; Turbo (Sarmaticus) sarmaticus Linnaeus, 1758

= Turbo sarmaticus =

Species of gastropod

Turbo sarmaticus, common names South African turban, giant turban, ollycrock, or alikreukel, is a species of sea snail, marine gastropod mollusk in the family Turbinidae.

Some authors place this species in the subgenus Sarmaticus.

== Description ==
The length of the shell varies between 40 mm and 120 mm. The imperforate shell has a globose-depressed shape. Its color pattern is dull brownish, above flammulated, below more or less banded or maculate with white, usually showing more or less of the underlying orange-red layer, between which and the nacre there is a stratum of intense black. The very short spire is conic. The 5-6 whorls are convex but concave above. The upper ones contain revolving lirae. They are frequently carinated, the last traversed by several rows of nodules, of which the coronal is the more prominent and constant. The large, orbicular aperture is very oblique and beautifully nacreous within. The outer lip is thin, margined with intense black within. The nacre does not extend to the edge. The arcuate columella is wide, slightly produced below, broadly excavated above. The parietal wall is eroded, showing a black blotch.

The operculum is flat within. It contains 5-6 whorls and a submedian nucleus. The outer surface is convex, whitish, and covered with calcareous pustules on the exterior side.

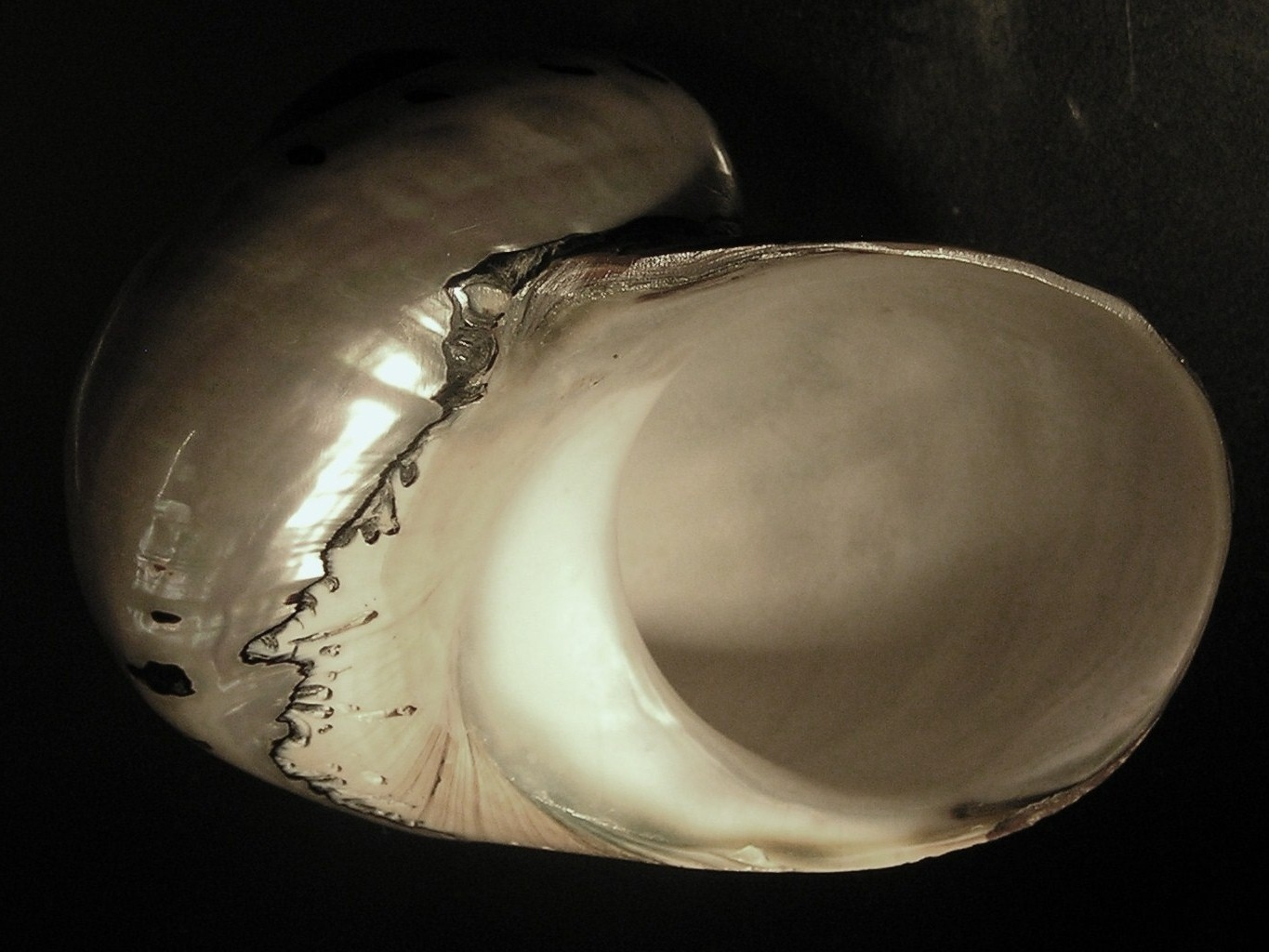
Aperture of Turbo sarmaticus

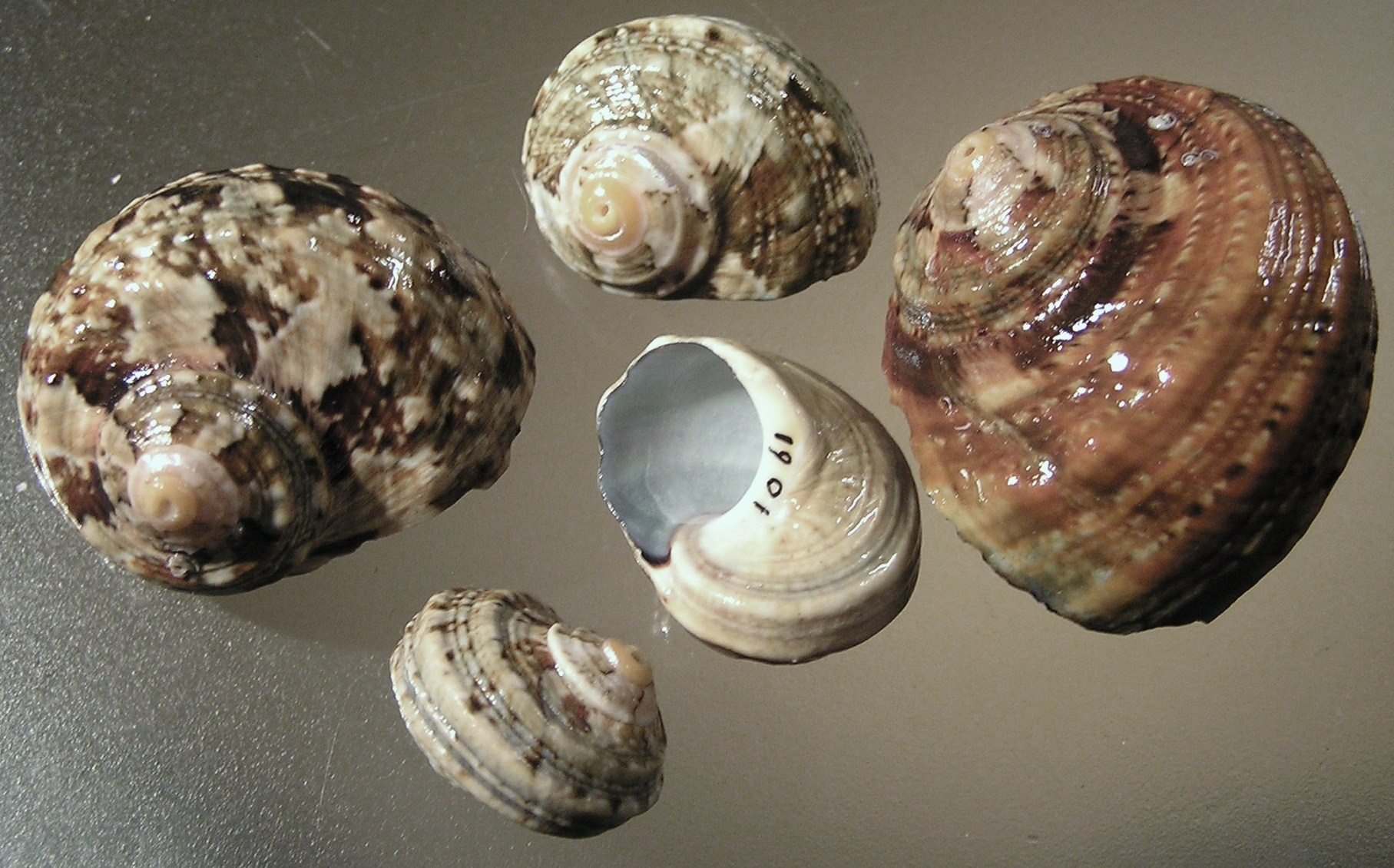
Shells of Turbo sarmaticus

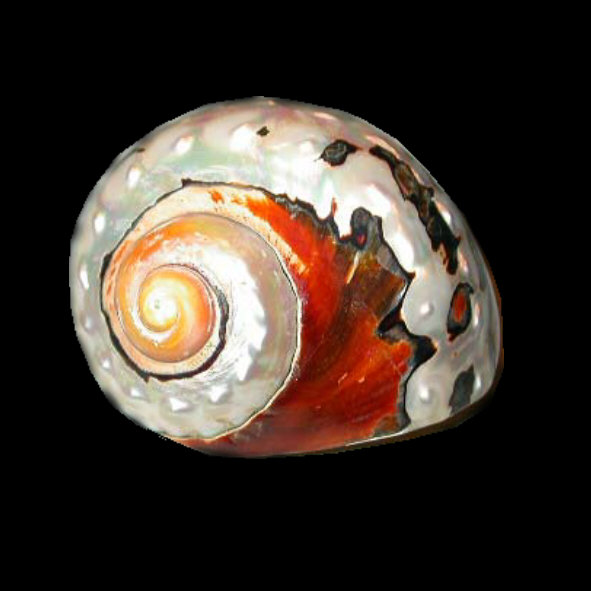
A polished shell of Turbo sarmaticus

== Distribution ==
This marine species occurs abundantly and is most often found off the south coast of South Africa.
