= Still Bay =

Still Bay Stilbaai
- Town
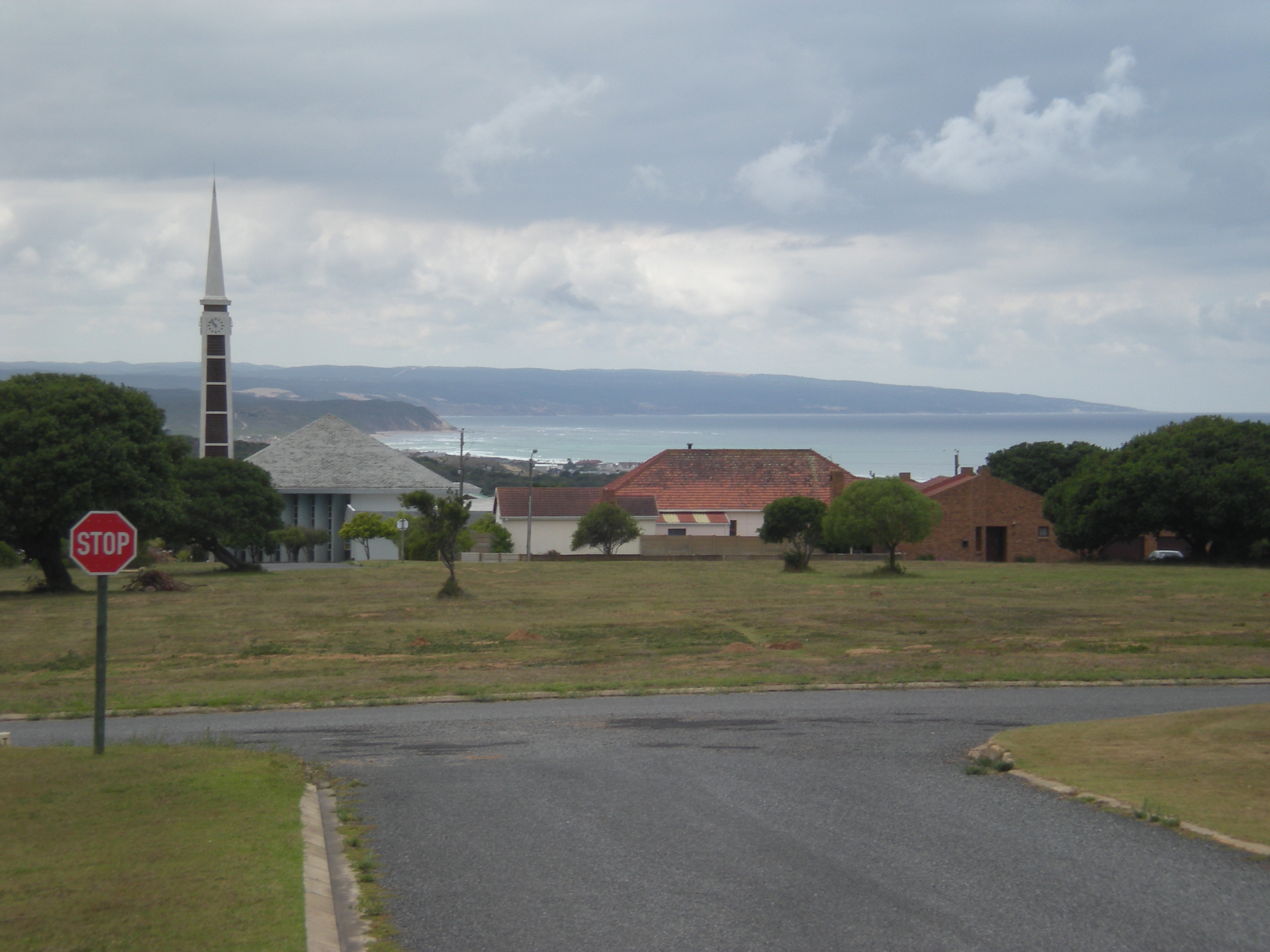
- Stilbaai, with the Dutch Reformed Church in Stilbaai West, looking east

- Location within Western Cape Location within South Africa Location within Africa
- Coordinates: 34°22′06″S 21°24′40″E
- Country: South Africa
- Province: Western Cape
- District: Garden Route
- Municipality: Hessequa

Area
  - Total: 25.48 km^{2} (9.84 sq mi)
- Highest elevation: 18 m (59 ft)
- Lowest elevation: 0 m (0 ft)

Population (2011)
  - Total: 3,514
  - Density: 137.9/km^{2} (357.2/sq mi)

Racial makeup (2011)
  - Black African: 3.5%
  - Coloured: 3.2%
  - Indian/Asian: 0.1%
  - White: 92.3%
  - Other: 0.8%

First languages (2011)
  - Afrikaans: 84.5%
  - English: 13.7%
  - Other: 1.8%
- Time zone: UTC+2 (SAST)
- Postal code (street): 6674
- PO box: 6674
- Area code: 028

Still Bay (Afrikaans: Stilbaai), is a coastal town in the Western Cape of South Africa. It lies about 320 km east of Cape Town and 26 km south of the N2 highway. The town sits at the mouth of the Goukou River where it meets the Indian Ocean. It grew from a seasonal fishing and farming stop into a popular holiday and retirement town. The town is often called the Bay of Sleeping Beauty because of the nearby mountain peak in the Langeberg range.

== Etymology ==
The name refers to the calm waters of the bay. Early fishers and sailors used it as a sheltered anchorage. The area was first inhabited by the Hessequa, a Khoikhoi group. Their legacy remains visible in ancient fish traps and shell middens, which dates back to around 1000 BC.

== Geography ==
Still Bay lies on the Agulhas Bank and is influenced by the warm Agulhas Current. The Goukou River divides the town into Still Bay West and Still Bay East. The river is navigable for about 15 kilometres inland and forms a productive estuary.

The coastline includes sandy beaches, limestone formations, and rocky headlands. Notable features include the Preekstoel rock formation and Noordkapperpunt. The permanently open Goukou estuary supports fish breeding and migration.

=== Climate ===
Still Bay has a temperate coastal climate. Rain falls throughout the year, with slight peaks in autumn and spring. Average summer temperatures range from 20 to 28 degrees Celsius. Winter temperatures range from 12 to 20 degrees Celsius. Mean annual rainfall is about 639 millimetres. Sea temperatures range from 14 to 24 degrees Celsius depending on season.

=== Ecology ===
Still Bay forms part of the Cape Floristic Region, a global biodiversity hotspot. Vegetation types include limestone fynbos, sand fynbos, strandveld, and renosterveld. Many plant species are endemic to the region.

The Tuin Op Die Brak botanical garden conserves local fynbos species and includes plants of cultural and medicinal importance.

The Stilbaai Marine Protected Area was established in 2008. It protects 15.7 kilometres of the Goukou estuary and 13.5 kilometres of coastline. The estuary also serves as a nursery for fish species.

Wildlife includes Southern Right whales, dolphins, reef fish such as galjoen, and various seabirds and estuarine birds. More than 200 bird species have been recorded in the area.

== Archaeology ==
Still Bay is internationally recognised for its role in Middle Stone Age research. The Still Bay Industry, dated to about 75,000 to 71,000 years BP, was first identified from stone tools found in the area. These tools include finely made bifacial points known as Still Bay points.

Research shows that early humans in the area used heat treatment to improve silcrete before shaping it. They also used pressure flaking to refine tool edges.

About 12 kilometres west of the town lies Blombos Cave. Excavations led by Christopher Henshilwood uncovered engraved ochre dated to about 77,000 BP, perforated marine shell beads, bone tools, and evidence of ochre processing.

Tidal fish traps built by Khoisan ancestors remain visible along the coast. These stone-walled structures trap fish during low tide. Dating suggests they have been used for at least 3,000 years. They are protected as heritage sites within the Stilbaai Marine Protected Area.

== History ==
European farmers settled in the area during the eighteenth and nineteenth centuries. The Palinggat homestead, built in 1809, is the oldest surviving structure and now houses tourism offices and a local museum.

In 1902, flooding of the Goukou River damaged early development on the eastern bank. Settlement shifted toward the western side. In 1955, a bridge across the Goukou River was completed, improving access and accelerating growth.

Still Bay became a municipality in 1966. After 1994 it formed part of the Hessequa Local Municipality, which includes Riversdale, Jongensfontein, and Melkhoutfontein.

== Demographics ==
According to the 2011 census, Still Bay had a population of 3,514 people in 1,735 households. About 92 percent of residents identified as White, 3.5 percent as Black African, and 3.2 percent as Coloured. Afrikaans was the main home language, spoken by about 85 percent of residents. English accounted for about 14 percent.

The population has a high proportion of retirees. In 2011, about 44 percent of residents were aged 65 or older. Recent growth reflects migration from other provinces to the Western Cape.

== Parks and greenspace ==
Stilbaai owns a large selection of nature reserves. To the east is Pauline Bohnen Nature Reserve, a large reserve with various hiking routes. The Skulpiesbaai Nature Reserve is situated near the harbour and reaches up to the "Noordkapperpunt" fishponds. The Geelkrants Nature Reserve is situated next to the "Pulpit".

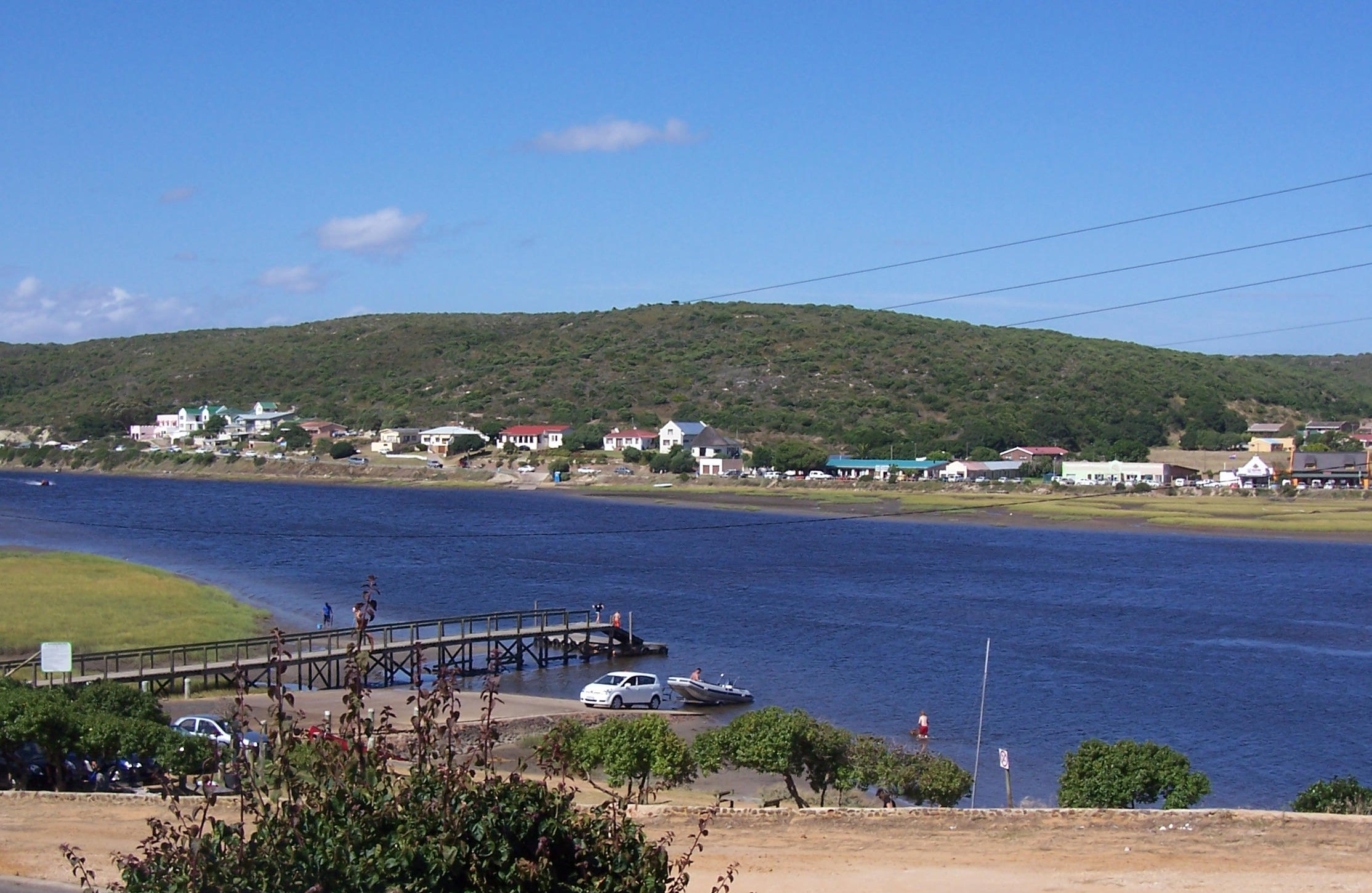
A view of the Goukou River that separates the eastern and western halves of Stilbaai.

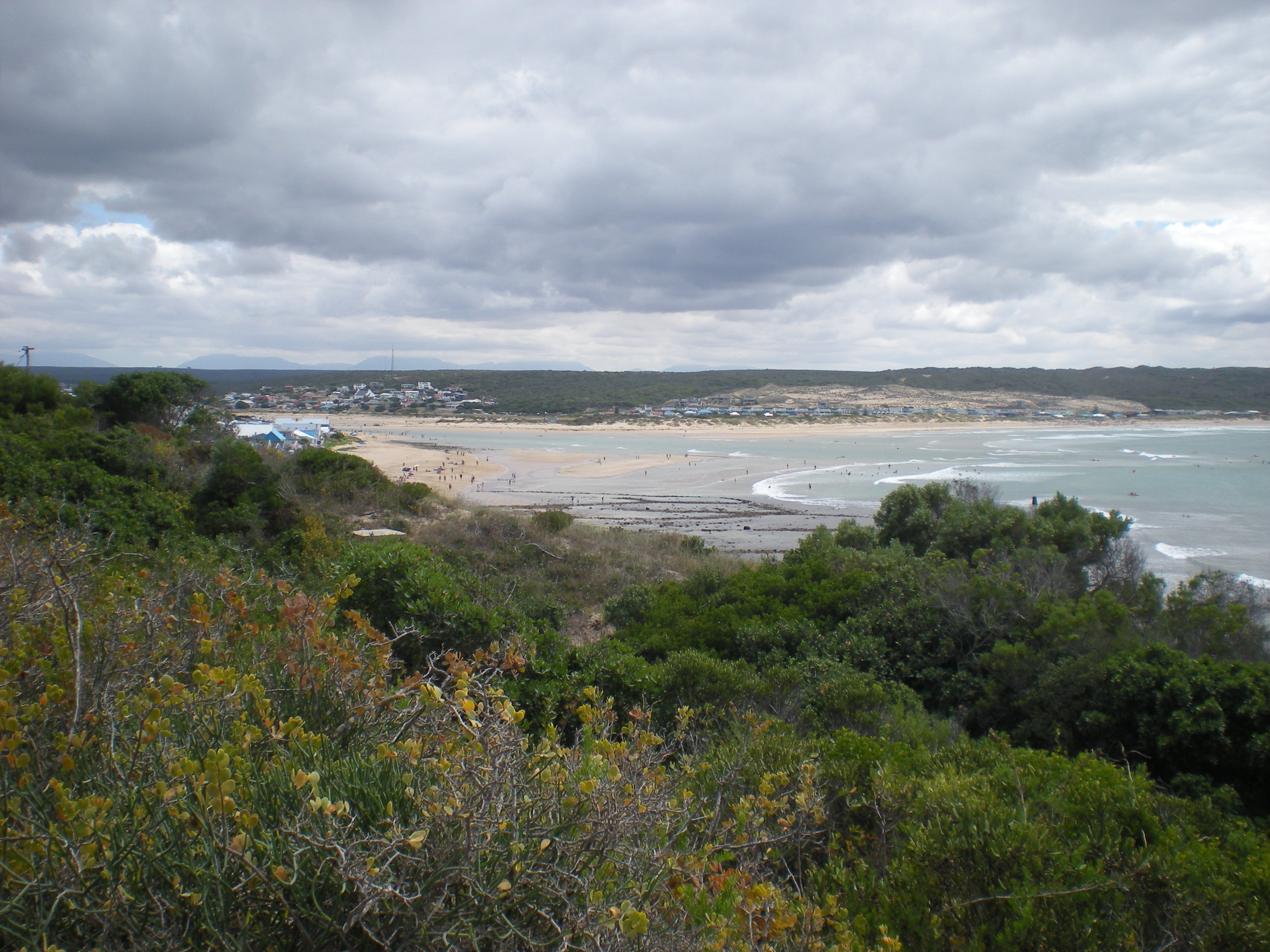
Stilbaai, viewed from the lookout above the harbour.

== See also ==
- Stillbay period around 71,000 BP in the Middle Stone Age named after an archeological site.
- Oswego-Guardian/Texanita collision
