= Christopher Henshilwood =

South African archaeologist

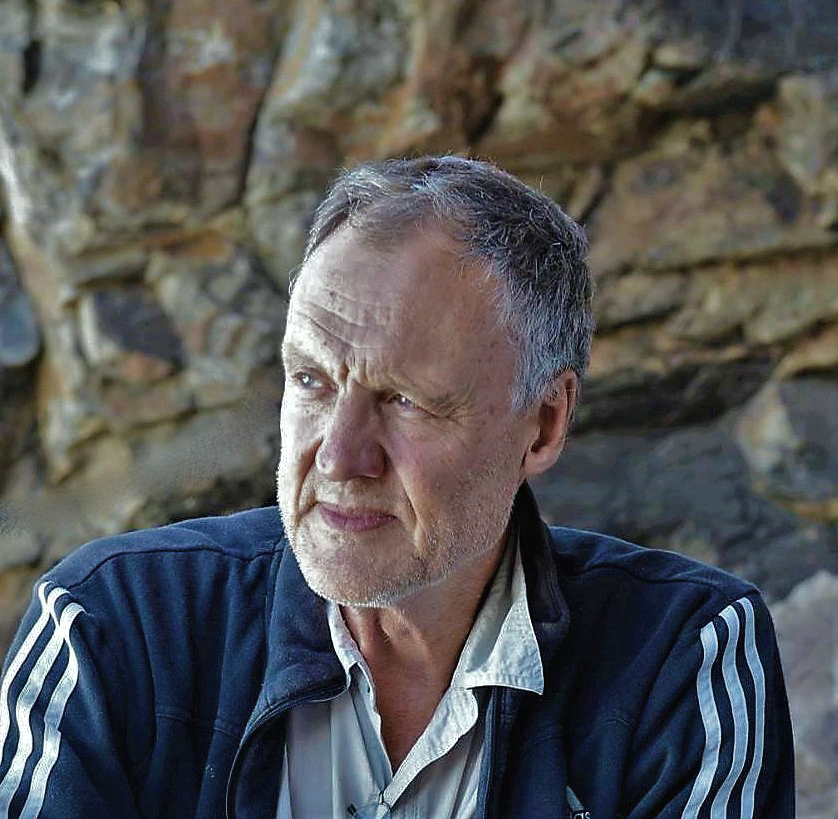
- Christopher Henshilwood at Blombos Cave
- Born: Christopher Stuart Henshilwood
- Education: University of Cape Town; University of Cambridge
- Children: Bronwen henshilwood and Nicholas henshilwood
- Scientific career
- Fields: Archaeology
- Workplaces: University of Bergen; University of the Witwatersrand
- Thesis: Holocene archaeology of the coastal Garcia State Forest, southern Cape, South Africa (1995)
- Website: Christopher Henshilwood at WITS; Christopher Henshilwood at Bergen

Christopher Stuart Henshilwood is a South African archaeologist. He has been Professor of African Archaeology at the University of Bergen since 2007 and, since 2008, Professor at the Chair of "The Origins of Modern Human Behaviour" at the University of the Witwatersrand. Henshilwood became internationally known due to his excavations in the Blombos Cave, where - according to his study published in 2002 - the oldest known works of humanity had been discovered. Henshilwood and his work have been featured on National Geographic and CNN Inside Africa.

== Education and career ==
Henshilwood completed his BA (with distinction in Archaeology) from the University of Cape Town (UCT) in 1989, BA.Hons (with distinction) from UCT in 1990 and PhD (Archaeology) from the University of Cambridge in 1995, with a thesis entitled "Holocene archaeology of the coastal Garcia State Forest, southern Cape, South Africa". He completed a postdoctoral research fellowship at UCT from 1996 to 1997.

He was awarded research funding from the Anglo American Chairman's Fund from 1998 to 2001 for research on “Modern Human Origins”. During this time and until 2004 he worked as an adjunct associate professor at the department of anthropology, State University of New York, Stony Brook. From there in 2002 he moved to the University of Bergen in Norway where he was appointed as a professor at the Centre for Development Studies in the Department of Archaeology. Concurrently he acted as research member at the University of Bordeaux, France for the programme "Origine de l'Homme, du langage et des langue" (The origin of man, speech and language).

He currently leads the Center of Excellence SAPIENce at the University of Bergen. The center researches early human behavior and includes a team of multidisciplinary scholars, including paleoclimatologists Nele Meckler and Eystein Jansen and psychologists Andrea Bender and Kenneth Hugdahl.

== Awards and recognition ==
- In 2014 he was ranked in the top 10 of South Africa’s most influential scientific minds for the period 2002–2012 by the South African Journal of Science
- In 2002 Henshilwood was invited to the opening of the Parliament of South Africa in Cape Town and was mentioned by President Thabo Mbeki in his State of the Nation address.
- In 2000, Nelson Mandela became a patron of the Blombos project, at the request of Henshilwood.
- National Geographic has featured aspects of his work at Blombos cave on three occasions.

=== Television appearances ===
- 2010 – NHK Japanese Broadcasting Corporation: Film for TV made with Henshilwood at Blombos Cave
- 2010 – Film made at Cape Point Nature Reserve with Henshilwood on the 'Origins of H. sapiens' for Foster Brother Film Productions, South Africa.
- 2009 – TV film made with Henshilwood at Blombos Cave for the Swedish Broadcasting Society Directed by Martin Widman and presented by Lasse Berg
- 2008 – Film made at Blombos Cave with Henshilwood in March, 2008 for display in the ‘Anne & Bernard Spitzer Hall of Human Origins’, American Museum of Natural History, New York.
- 2008 – Film made at De Hoop Nature Reserve with Henshilwood directed by Alan Wilcox on Human Evolution in Africa. SABC Production.

== Selected publications ==
- Henshilwood, CS et al. (2002). "Emergence of modern human behavior: Middle Stone Age engravings from South Africa". Science. 295 (5558): 1278-1280.
- Henshilwood, Christopher S.; d’Errico, Francesco; van Niekerk, Karen L.; Coquinot, Yvan; Jacobs, Zenobia; Lauritzen, Stein-Erik; Menu, Michel; García-Moreno, Renata (14 October 2011). "A 100,000-Year-Old Ochre-Processing Workshop at Blombos Cave, South Africa". Science. 334 (6053). American Association for the Advancement of Science (AAAS): 219–222. Bibcode:2011Sci...334..219H. doi:10.1126/science.1211535. ISSN 0036-8075. PMID 21998386. S2CID 40455940.
- Henshilwood, Christopher; d'Errico, Francesco; Vanhaeren, Marian; van Niekerk, Karen; Jacobs, Zenobia (16 April 2004). "Middle Stone Age Shell Beads from South Africa". Science. 304 (5669). American Association for the Advancement of Science (AAAS): 404. doi:10.1126/science.1095905. ISSN 0036-8075. PMID 15087540. S2CID 32356688.
- Henshilwood, Christopher S.; Marean, Curtis W. (2003). "The Origin of Modern Human Behavior". Current Anthropology. 44 (5). University of Chicago Press: 627–651. doi:10.1086/377665. ISSN 0011-3204. PMID 14971366. S2CID 11081605.
- Henshilwood, C.S.; Sealy, J.C.; Yates, R.; Cruz-Uribe, K.; Goldberg, P.; Grine, F.E.; Klein, R.G.; Poggenpoel, C.; van Niekerk, K.; Watts, I. (2001). "Blombos Cave, Southern Cape, South Africa: Preliminary Report on the 1992–1999 Excavations of the Middle Stone Age Levels". Journal of Archaeological Science. 28 (4). Elsevier BV: 421–448. Bibcode:2001JArSc..28..421H. doi:10.1006/jasc.2000.0638. ISSN 0305-4403.
- Henshilwood, Christopher S.; D'errico, Francesco; Marean, Curtis W.; Milo, Richard G.; Yates, Royden (2001). "An early bone tool industry from the Middle Stone Age at Blombos Cave, South Africa: implications for the origins of modern human behaviour, symbolism and language". Journal of Human Evolution. 41 (6). Elsevier BV: 631–678. Bibcode:2001JHumE..41..631H. doi:10.1006/jhev.2001.0515. ISSN 0047-2484. PMID 11782112.

== See also ==
- Blombos Cave
