= OH 9 =

OH 9 may refer to:

- Ohio State Route 9
- Ohio's 9th congressional district
- Olduvai Hominid 9
