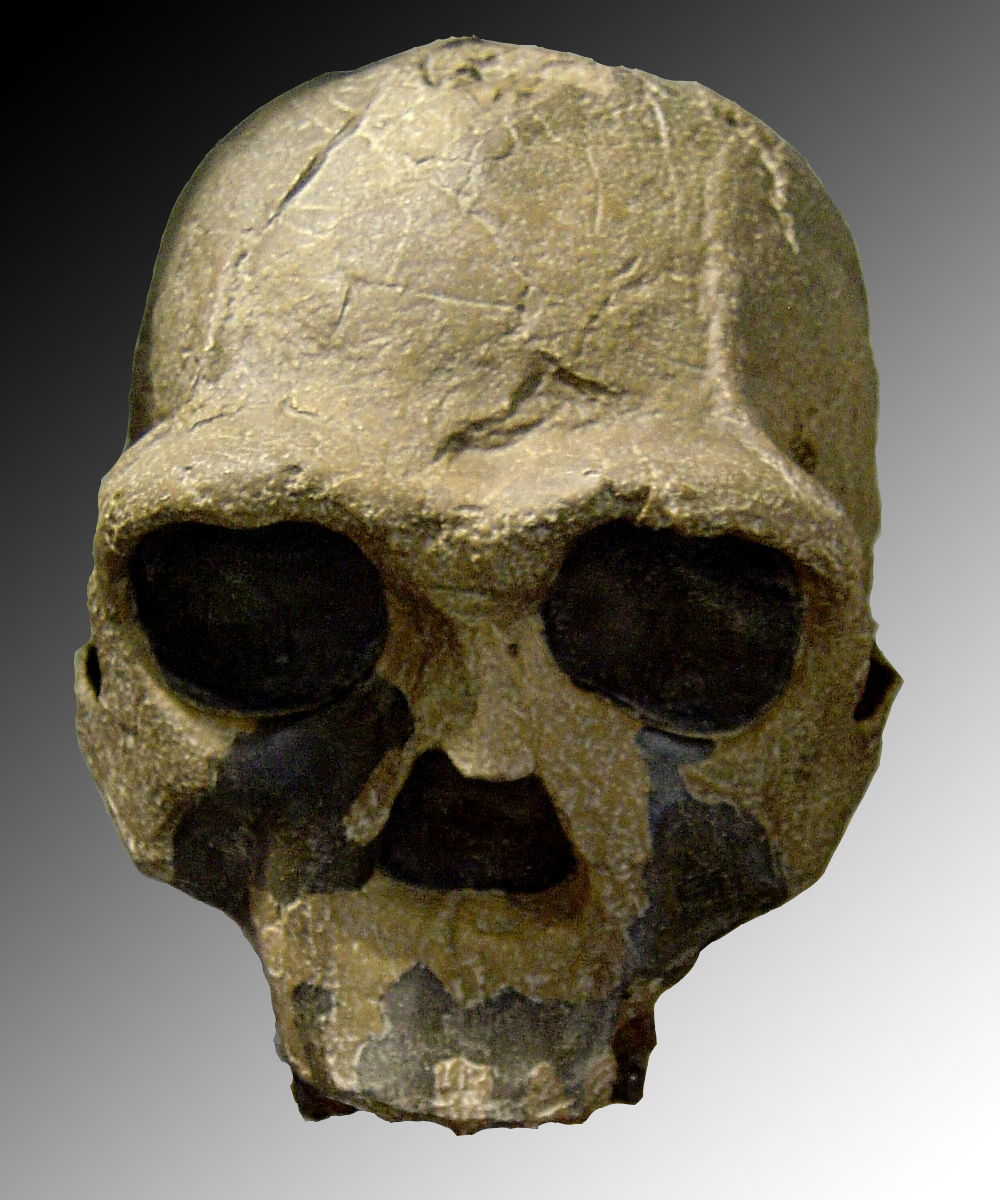
- KNM ER 3733, a 1.6-million-year-old skull of Homo ergaster discovered in 1975 at Koobi Fora, Kenya

Scientific classification
- Kingdom: Animalia
- Phylum: Chordata
- Class: Mammalia
- Infraclass: Placentalia
- Order: Primates
- Superfamily: Hominoidea
- Family: Hominidae
- Genus: Homo
- Species: †H. ergaster

Binomial name
- †Homo ergaster Groves and Mazák, 1975

Subspecies
- Homo erectus ergaster georgicus?

Synonyms
- † Telanthropus capensis Broom and Robinson, 1949 † Homo erectus ergaster (Groves and Mazák, 1975) †Homo louisleakeyi Kretzoi, 1984 † Homo kenyaensis Zeitoun, 2000 † Homo okotensis Zeitoun, 2000

= Homo ergaster =

Homo ergaster Temporal range: Early Pleistocene, 2.04/1.95–1.4/0.87 Ma

Extinct species or subspecies of archaic human

Homo ergaster is an extinct species or subspecies of archaic humans who lived in Africa in the Early Pleistocene. Whether H. ergaster constitutes a species of its own or should be subsumed into H. erectus is an ongoing dispute within palaeoanthropology. Proponents of synonymisation typically designate H. ergaster as "African Homo erectus" or "Homo erectus ergaster". The name Homo ergaster roughly translates to "working man", a reference to the more advanced tools used by the species in comparison to those of their ancestors. The fossil range of H. ergaster mainly covers the period of 1.7 to 1.4 million years ago, though a broader time range is possible. Though fossils are known from across East and Southern Africa, most H. ergaster fossils have been found along the shores of Lake Turkana in Kenya. There are later African fossils, some younger than 1 million years ago, that indicate long-term anatomical continuity, though it is unclear if they can be formally regarded as H. ergaster specimens. As a chronospecies, H. ergaster may have persisted to as late as 600,000 years ago, when new lineages of Homo arose in Africa.

Those who believe H. ergaster should be subsumed into H. erectus consider there to be too little difference between the two to separate them into distinct species. Proponents of keeping the two species as distinct cite morphological differences between the African fossils and H. erectus fossils from Asia, as well as early Homo evolution being more complex than what is implied by subsuming species such as H. ergaster into H. erectus. Additionally, morphological differences between the specimens commonly seen as constituting H. ergaster might suggest that H. ergaster itself does not represent a cohesive species. Regardless of their most correct classification, H. ergaster exhibit primitive versions of traits later expressed in H. erectus and are thus likely the direct ancestors of later H. erectus populations in Asia. Additionally, H. ergaster is likely ancestral to later hominins in Europe and Africa, such as modern humans and Neanderthals.

Several features distinguish H. ergaster from australopithecines as well as earlier and more basal species of Homo, such as H. habilis. Among these features are their larger body mass, relatively long legs, obligate bipedalism, and relatively small jaws and teeth (indicating a major change in diet) as well as body proportions and inferred lifestyles more similar to modern humans than to earlier and contemporary hominins. With these features in mind, some researchers view H. ergaster as being the earliest true representative of the genus Homo.

H. ergaster lived on the savannah in Africa, a unique environment with challenges that would have resulted in the need for many new and distinct behaviours. Earlier Homo probably used counter-attack tactics, like modern primates, to keep predators away. By the time of H. ergaster, this behaviour had probably resulted in the development of true hunter-gatherer behaviour, a first among primates. H. ergaster was an apex predator. Further behaviours that might first have arisen in H. ergaster include male-female divisions of foraging and true monogamous pair bonds. H. ergaster also marks the appearance of more advanced tools of the Acheulean industry, including the earliest-known hand axes. Though undisputed evidence is missing, H. ergaster might also have been the earliest hominin to master control of fire.

== Taxonomy ==
Hominin timeline
← / Earlier apes; ← / Gorilla split; ← / Chimpanzee split; ← / Earliest bipedal; ← / Earliest sign of Ardipithecus; ← / Earliest sign of Australopithecus; ← / Earliest stone tools; ← / Earliest sign of Homo; ← / Dispersal beyond Africa; ← / Earliest fire / cooking; ← / Earliest rock art; ← / Earliest clothes; ← / Modern humans
(million years ago)

=== Research history ===
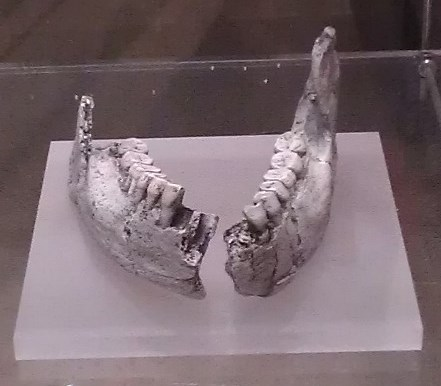
Replica of KNM ER 992, the holotype specimen of Homo ergaster

The systematics and taxonomy of Homo in the Early to Middle Pleistocene is one of the most disputed areas of palaeoanthropology. In early palaeoanthropology and well into the twentieth century, it was generally assumed that Homo sapiens was the end result of gradual modifications within a single lineage of hominin evolution. As the perceived transitional form between early hominins and modern humans, H. erectus, originally assigned to contain archaic human fossils in Asia, came to encompass a wide range of fossils covering a large span of time (almost the entire temporal range of Homo). Since the late twentieth century, the diversity within H. erectus has led some to question what exactly defines the species and what it should encompass. Some researchers, such as palaeoanthropologist Ian Tattersall in 2013, have questioned H. erectus since it contains an "unwieldly" number of fossils with "substantially differing morphologies".

In the 1970s, palaeoanthropologists Richard Leakey and Alan Walker described a series of hominin fossils from Kenyan fossil localities on the eastern shore of Lake Turkana. The most notable finds were two partial skulls; KNM ER 3733 and KNM ER 3883, found at Koobi Fora. Leakey and Walker assigned these skulls to H. erectus, noting that their brain volumes (848 and 803 cc, respectively) compared well to the far younger type specimen of H. erectus (950 cc). Another significant fossil was a fossil mandible recovered at Ileret and described by Leakey with the designation KNM ER 992 in 1972 as "Homo of indeterminate species".

In 1975, palaeoanthropologists Colin Groves and Vratislav Mazák designated KNM ER 992 as the holotype specimen of a distinct species, which they dubbed Homo ergaster. The name (ergaster being derived from the Ancient Greek ἐργαστήρ, ergastḗr, 'workman') roughly translates to "working man" or "workman". Groves and Mazák also included many of the Koobi Fora fossils, such as KNM ER 803 (a partial skeleton and some isolated teeth) in their designation of the species, but did not provide any comparison with the Asian fossil record of H. erectus in their diagnosis, inadvertently causing some of the later taxonomic confusion in regards to the species.

A nearly complete fossil, interpreted as a young male (though the sex is actually undetermined), was discovered at the western shore of Lake Turkana in 1984 by Kenyan archaeologist Kamoya Kimeu. The fossils were described by Leakey and Walker, alongside paleoanthropologists Frank Brown and John Harris, in 1985 as KNM WT 15000 (nicknamed "Turkana Boy"). They interpreted the fossil, consisting of a nearly complete skeleton, as representing H. erectus. Turkana Boy was the first discovered comprehensively preserved specimen of H. ergaster/erectus found and constitutes an important fossil in establishing the differences and similarities between early Homo and modern humans. Turkana Boy was placed in H. ergaster by paleoanthropologist Bernard Wood in 1992, and is today, alongside other fossils in Africa previously designated as H. erectus, commonly seen as a representative of H. ergaster by those who support H. ergaster as a distinct species.

=== Classification ===
H. ergaster is easily distinguished from earlier and more basal species of Homo, notably H. habilis and H. rudolfensis, by a number of features that align them, and their inferred lifestyle, more closely to modern humans than to earlier and contemporary hominins. As compared to their relatives, H. ergaster had body proportions more similar to later members of the genus Homo, notably relatively long legs which would have made them obligately bipedal. The teeth and jaws of H. ergaster are also relatively smaller than those of H. habilis and H. rudolfensis, indicating a major change in diet. In 1999, palaeoanthropologists Bernard Wood and Mark Collard argued that the conventional criteria for assigning species to the genus Homo were flawed and that early and basal species, such as H. habilis and H. rudolfensis, might appropriately be reclassified as ancestral australopithecines. In their view, the true earliest representative of Homo was H. ergaster.

- - Au. africanus
  - Au. garhi
- - - H. habilis
    - H. rudolfensis
  - - H. ergaster
    - - H. erectus
      - - H. antecessor
        - - - H. heidelbergensis
            - H. neanderthalensis
          - H. sapiens

Cladogram per Strait, Grine & Fleagle (2015)

Since its description as a separate species in 1975, the classification of the fossils referred to H. ergaster has been in dispute. H. ergaster was immediately dismissed by Leakey and Walker and many influential researchers, such as palaeoanthropologist G. Philip Rightmire, who wrote an extensive treatise on H. erectus in 1990, continued to prefer a more inclusive and comprehensive H. erectus. Overall, there is no doubt that the group of fossils composing H. erectus and H. ergaster represent the fossils of a more or less cohesive subset of closely related archaic humans. The question is instead whether these fossils represent a radiation of different species or the radiation of a single, highly variable and diverse, species over the course of almost two million years. This long-running debate remains unresolved, with researchers typically using the terms H. erectus s.s. (sensu stricto) to refer to H. erectus fossils in Asia and the term H. erectus s.l. (sensu lato) to refer to fossils of other species that may or may not be included in H. erectus, such as H. ergaster, H. antecessor and H. heidelbergensis.

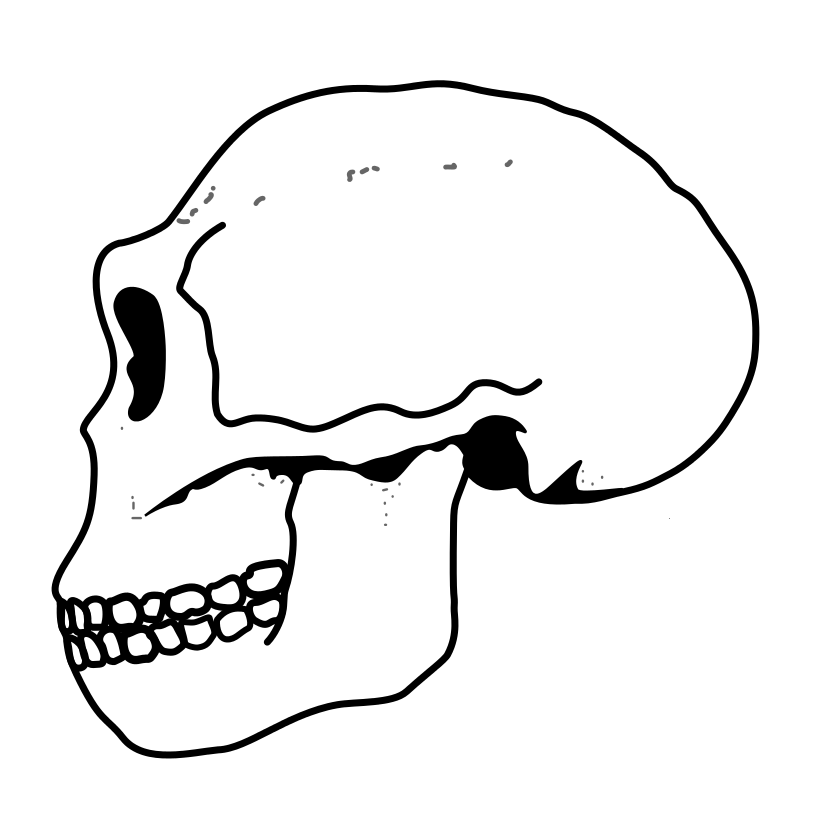
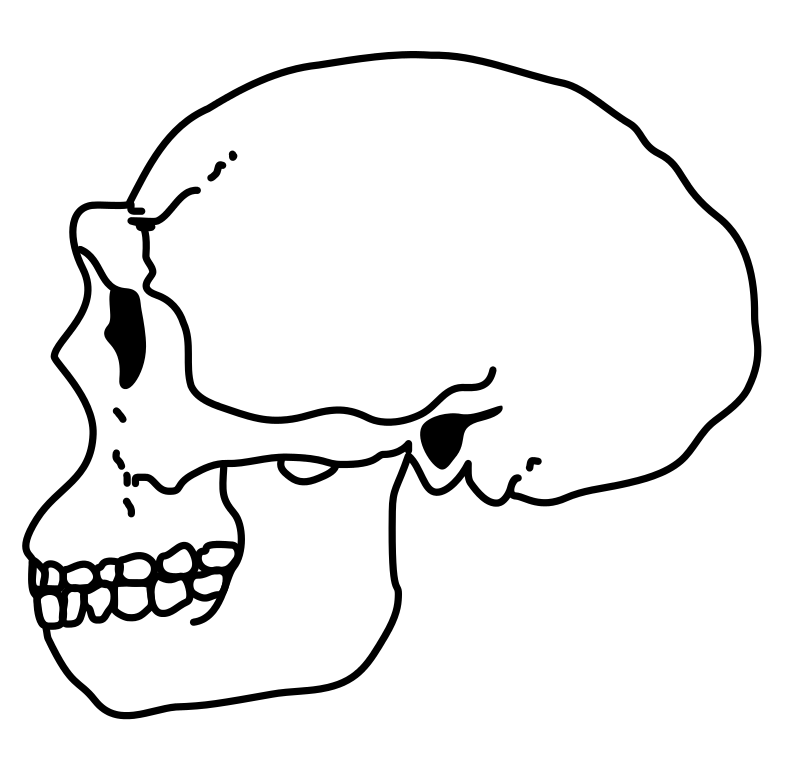
Reconstructions of the skulls of Homo ergaster (left, based on KNM ER 3733) and later Homo erectus (right, based on Peking Man)

For obvious reasons, H. ergaster shares many features with H. erectus, such as large forward-projecting jaws, large brow ridges and a receding forehead. Many of the features of H. ergaster are clearly more primitive versions of features later expressed in H. erectus, which somewhat obscures the differences between the two. There are subtle, potentially significant, differences between the East African and East Asian fossils. Among these are the somewhat higher-domed and thinner-walled skulls of H. ergaster, and the even more massive brow ridges and faces of Asian H. erectus.

The question is made more difficult since it regards how much intraspecific variation can be exhibited in a single species before it needs to be split into more, a question that in and of itself does not have a clear-cut answer. A 2008 analysis by anthropologist Karen L. Baab, examining fossils of various H. erectus subspecies, and including fossils attributed to H. ergaster, found that the intraspecific variation within H. erectus was greater than expected for a single species when compared to modern humans and chimpanzees, but fell well within the variation expected for a species when compared to gorillas, and even well within the range expected for a single subspecies when compared to orangutans (though this is partly due to the great sexual dimorphism exhibited in gorillas and orangutans). Baab concluded that H. erectus s.l. was either a single but variable species, several subspecies divided by time and geography or several geographically dispersed but closely related species. In 2015, paleoanthropologists David Strait, Frederick Grine and John Fleagle listed H. ergaster as one of the seven "widely recognized" species of Homo, alongside H. habilis, H. rudolfensis, H. erectus, H. heidelbergensis, H. neanderthalensis and H. sapiens, noting that other species, such as H. floresiensis and H. antecessor, were less widely recognised or more poorly known.

==== Variation in the fossil material ====
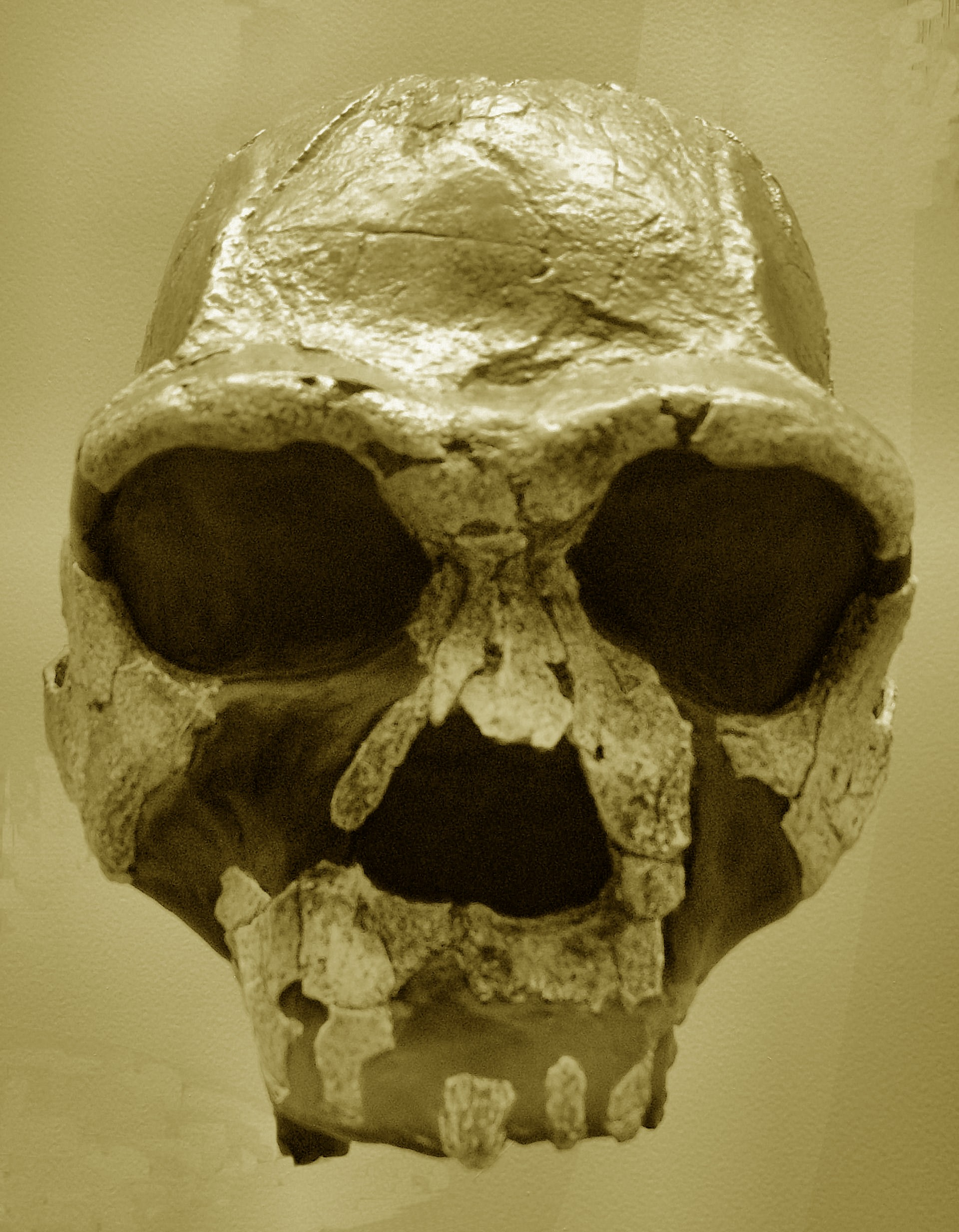
KNM ER 3733

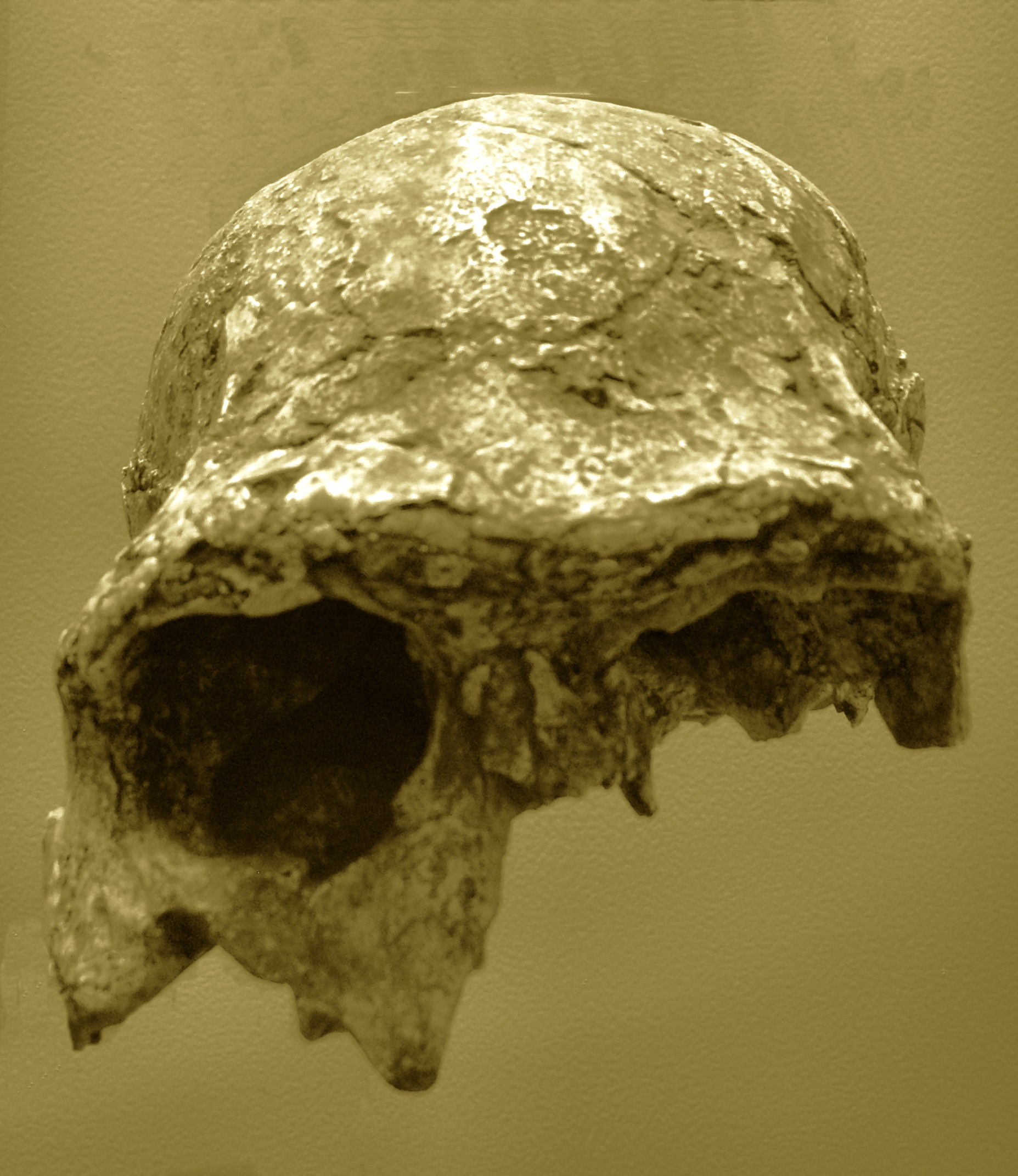
KNM ER 3883

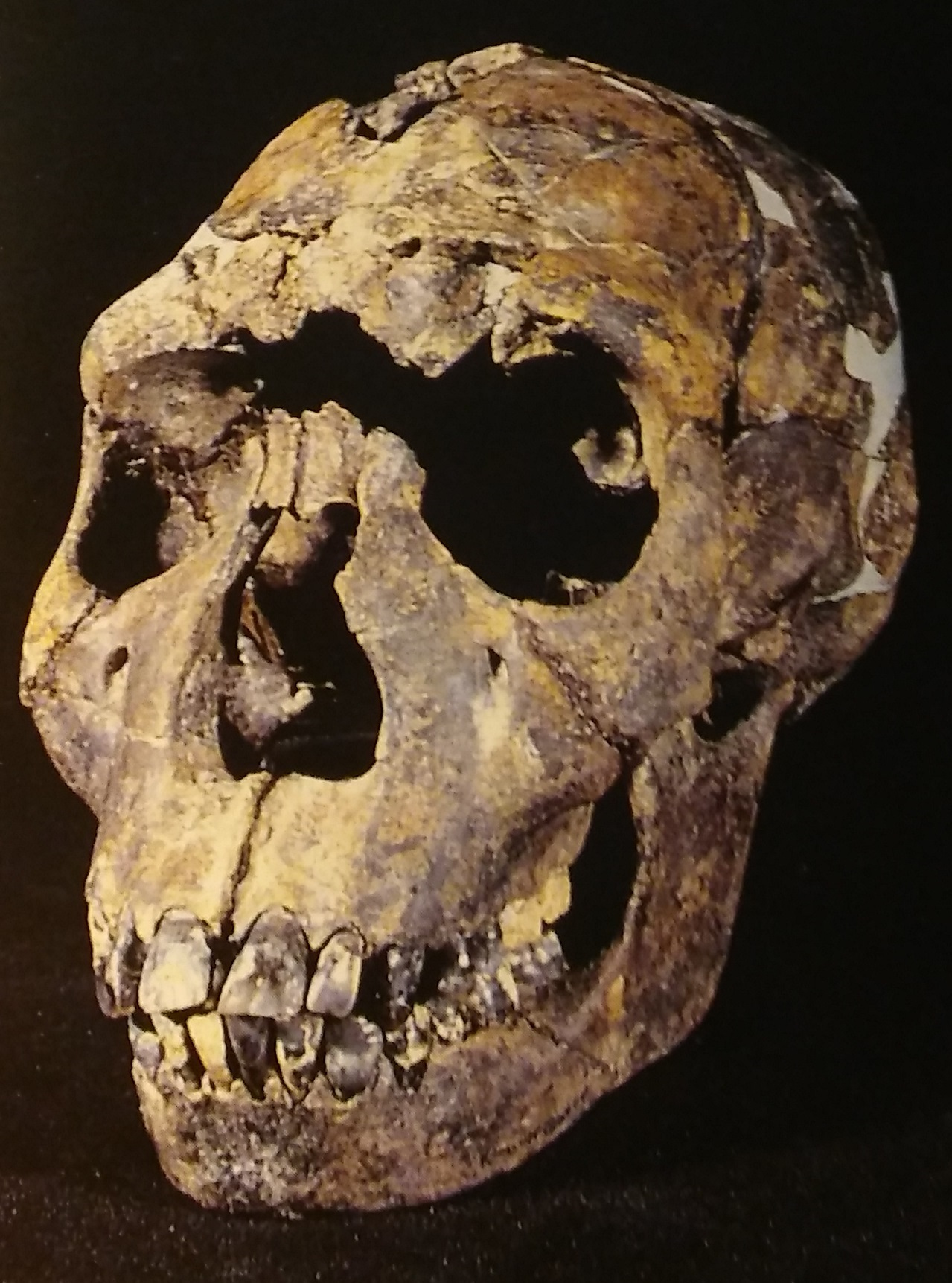
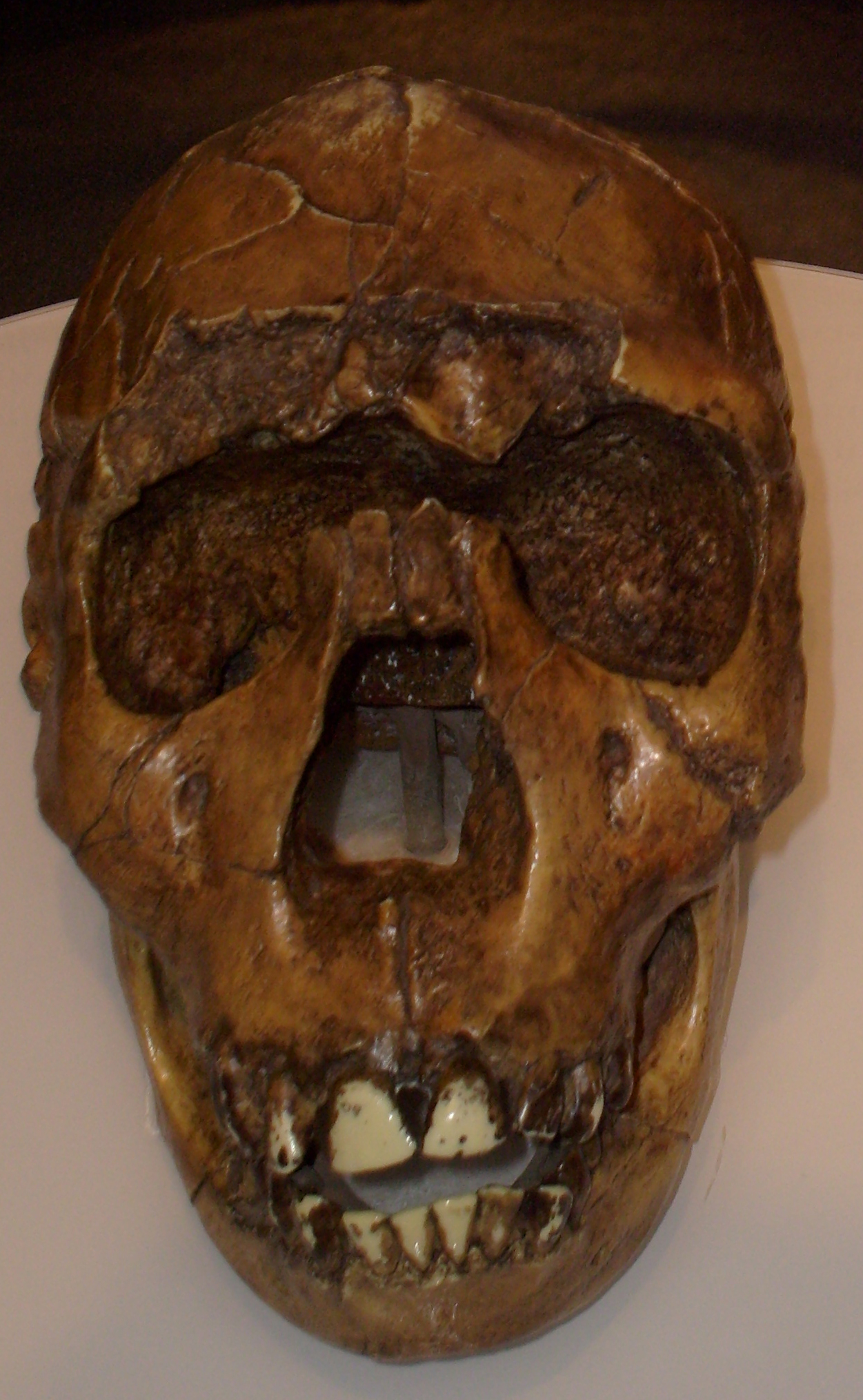
KNM WT 15000 ("Turkana Boy")

Comparing various African fossils attributed to H. erectus or H. ergaster to Asian fossils, notably the type specimen of H. erectus, in 2013, Ian Tattersall concluded that referring to the African material as H. ergaster rather than "African H. erectus" was a "considerable improvement" as there were many autapomorphies distinguishing the material of the two continents from one another. Tattersall believes it to be appropriate to use the designation H. erectus only for eastern Asian fossils, disregarding its previous use as the name for an adaptive grade of human fossils from throughout Africa and Eurasia. Though Tattersall concluded that the H. ergaster material represents the fossils of a single clade of Homo, he also found there to be considerable diversity within this clade; the KNM ER 992 mandible accorded well with other fossil mandibles from the region, such as OH 22 from Olduvai and KNM ER 3724 from Koobi Fora, but did not necessarily match with cranial material, such as KNM ER 3733 and KNM ER 3883 (since neither preserves the jaw), nor with the mandible preserved in Turkana Boy, which has markedly different dentition.

The most "iconic" fossil of H. ergaster is the KNM ER 3733 skull, which is sharply distinguished from Asian H. erectus by a number of characteristics, including that the brow ridges project forward as well as upward and arc separately over each orbit and the braincase being quite tall compared to its width, with its side walls curving. KNM ER 3733 can be distinguished from KNM ER 3883 by a number of features as well, notably in that the margins of KNM ER 3883's brow ridges are very thickened and protrude outwards but slightly downwards rather than upwards. Both skulls can be distinguished from the skull of Turkana Boy, which possesses only slightly substantial thickenings of the superior orbital margins, lacking the more vertical thickening of KNM ER 3883 and the aggressive protrusion of KNM ER 3733. In addition to this, the facial structure of Turkana Boy is narrower and longer than that of the other skulls, with a higher nasal aperture and likely a flatter profile of the upper face. It is possible that these differences can be accounted for through Turkana Boy being a subadult, 7 to 12 years old. Furthermore, KNM ER 3733 is presumed to have been the skull of a female (whereas Turkana Boy is traditionally interpreted as male), which means that sexual dimorphism may account for some of the differences.

The differences between Turkana Boy's skull and KNM ER 3733 and KNM ER 3883, as well as the differences in dentition between Turkana Boy and KNM ER 992 have been interpreted by some, such as paleoanthropologist Jeffrey H. Schwartz, as suggesting that Turkana Boy and the rest of the H. ergaster material does not represent the same taxon. Schwartz also noted none of the fossils seemed to represent H. erectus either, which he believed was in need of significant revision. In 2000, French palaeoanthropologist Valéry Zeitoun suggested that KNM ER 3733 and KNM ER 3883 should be referred to two separate species, which she dubbed H. kenyaensis (type specimen KNM ER 3733) and H. okotensis (type specimen KNM ER 3883), but these designations have found little acceptance.

== Evolutionary history ==
=== Evolution and temporal range ===
Although frequently assumed to have originated in East Africa, the origins of H. ergaster are obscured by the fact that the species marks a radical departure from earlier species of Homo and Australopithecus in its long limbs, height and modern body proportions. Though a large number of Pleistocene tools have been found in East Africa, it can not be fully ascertained that H. ergaster originated there without further fossil discoveries. It is assumed that H. ergaster evolved from earlier species of Homo, probably H. habilis. Though populations of H. ergaster outside of Africa have been inferred based on the geographical distribution of their descendants and tools matching those in East Africa, fossils of the species are mainly from East Africa in the time range of 1.8 to 1.7 million years ago. Most fossils have been recovered from around the shores of Lake Turkana in Kenya.

The oldest known specimen of H. erectus s.l. in Africa (i.e. H. ergaster) is DNH 134, a skull recovered in the Drimolen Palaeocave System in South Africa, dated to 2.04 to 1.95 million years ago. The skull is also the oldest known H. erectus s.l. specimen overall, showing clear similarities to KNM ER 3733, and demonstrates that early H. ergaster coexisted with other hominins such as Paranthropus robustus and Australopithecus sediba.

There are also younger specimens of H. ergaster; notably, Turkana Boy is dated to about 1.56 million years ago. A handful of even younger African skulls make the case for long-term anatomical continuity, though it is unclear if they can appropriately be formally regarded as H. ergaster specimens; the "Olduvai Hominid 9" skull from Olduvai Gorge is dated to about 1.2 to 1.1 million years ago and there are also skulls from Buia (near the coast of Eritrea, dated to ~1 million years old), the Bouri Formation in Ethiopia (dated to between 1 million and 780,000 years old) and a fragmentary skull from Olorgesailie in Kenya (dated to between 970,000 and 900,000 years ago). The Olduvai skull is similar to Asian H. erectus in its massive brow ridge, but the others only show minor differences to earlier H. ergaster skulls.

The H. erectus in Asia, as well as later hominins in Europe (i. e. H. heidelbergensis and H. neanderthalensis) and Africa (H. sapiens) are all probably lineages descended from H. ergaster. Because H. ergaster is thought to have been ancestral to these later Homo, it might have persisted in Africa until around 600,000 years ago, when brain size increased rapidly and H. heidelbergensis emerged.

=== Expansion out of Africa ===
Successive dispersals of Homo ergaster/Homo erectus (yellow), Homo neanderthalensis (ochre) and Homo sapiens (red).

Traditionally, H. erectus was seen as the hominin that first left Africa to colonise Europe and Asia. If H. ergaster is distinct from H. erectus, this role would apply to H. ergaster instead. Very little concrete information is known on when and which Homo first appeared in Europe and Asia, since Early Pleistocene fossil hominins are scarce on both continents, and that it would have been H. ergaster (or "early H. erectus") that expanded, as well as the particular manner in which they did, remains conjecture. The presence of H. erectus fossils in East Asia means that a human species, most likely H. ergaster, had left Africa before 1 million years ago, the assumption historically having been that they first migrated out of Africa around 1.9 to 1.7 million years ago. Discoveries in Georgia and China push the latest possible date further back, before 2 million years ago, also casting doubt on the idea that H. ergaster was the first hominin to leave Africa.

The main reason for leaving Africa is likely to have been an increasing population periodically outgrowing their resource base, with splintering groups moving to establishing themselves in neighboring, empty territories over time. The physiology and improved technology of H. ergaster might have allowed them to travel to and colonise territories that no one had ever occupied before. It is unclear if H. ergaster was truly uniquely capable of expanding outside Africa; australopithecines had likely colonised savannah grasslands throughout Africa by 3 million years ago and there are no clear reasons as to why they would not have been able to expand into the grasslands of Asia before H. ergaster.

The general assumption is that hominins migrated out of the continent either across the southern end of the Red Sea or along the Nile Valley, but there are no fossil hominins known from either region in the early Pleistocene. The earliest Homo fossils outside Africa are the Dmanisi skulls from Georgia (dated to 1.77–1.85 million years old, representing either early H. ergaster or a new taxon, H. georgicus), three incisors from Ubeidiya in Israel (about 1.4 to 1 million years old) and the fossils of Java Man (H. erectus erectus, more than five thousand miles away). The dating of key Asian H. erectus specimens (including Java Man) is not entirely certain, but they are all likely to be 1.5 million years old or younger. Ubeidiya is also the oldest firmly confirmed site of Acheulean tools (one of the tool industries associated with H. ergaster) outside Africa, the tools recovered there closely resembling older tools discovered in East Africa.

The earliest fossil evidence of Homo in Asia are the aforementioned Dmanisi skulls, which share many traits with H. ergaster in Africa, suggesting that H. ergaster might have expanded out of Africa as early as 1.7–1.9 million years ago. In addition to H. ergaster-like traits, the Dmanisi skulls possess a wide assortment of other traits, some of which are similar to traits in earlier hominins such as H. habilis, and the site notably lacks preserved hand axes (otherwise characteristic of H. ergaster), which means that hominins might have spread out of Africa even earlier than H. ergaster. The skull D2700 (Dmanisi skull 3) in particular resembles H. habilis in the small volume of its braincase (600 cc), the form of the middle and upper face and the lack of an external nose. The mixture of skulls at Dmanisi suggests that the definition of H. ergaster (or H. erectus) might most appropriately be expanded to contain fossils that would otherwise be assigned to H. habilis or that two separate species of archaic humans left Africa early on. In addition to the Dmanisi fossils, stone tools manufactured by hominins have been discovered on the Loess Plateau in China and dated to 2.12 million years old, meaning that hominins must have left Africa before that time.

An alternative hypothesis historically has been that Homo evolved in Asia from earlier ancestors that had migrated there from Africa, and then expanded back into Europe, where it gave rise to H. sapiens. This view was notably held by Eugène Dubois, who first described H. erectus fossils in the 19th century and considered the fossils of Java Man, at the time undeniably the earliest known hominin fossils, as proof of the hypothesis. Though the discovery of australopithecines and earlier Homo in Africa meant that Homo itself did not originate in Asia, the idea that H. erectus (or H. ergaster) in particular did, and then expanded back into Africa, has occasionally resurfaced. Various fossil discoveries have been used to support it through the years, including a massive set of jaws from Indonesia which were perceived to be similar to those of australopithecines and dubbed Meganthropus (now believed to be an unrelated hominid ape). The discovery of H. floresiensis in 2003, which preserved primitive foot and wrist anatomy reminiscent of that of H. habilis and Australopithecus again led to suggestions of pre-erectus hominins in Asia, though there are no known comparable foot or wrist bones from H. erectus which makes comparisons impossible. The idea that H. ergaster/H. erectus first evolved in Asia before expanding back into Africa was substantially weakened by the dating of the DNH 134 skull as approximately 2 million years old, predating all other known H. ergaster/H. erectus fossils.

== Anatomy ==
=== Build and appearance ===
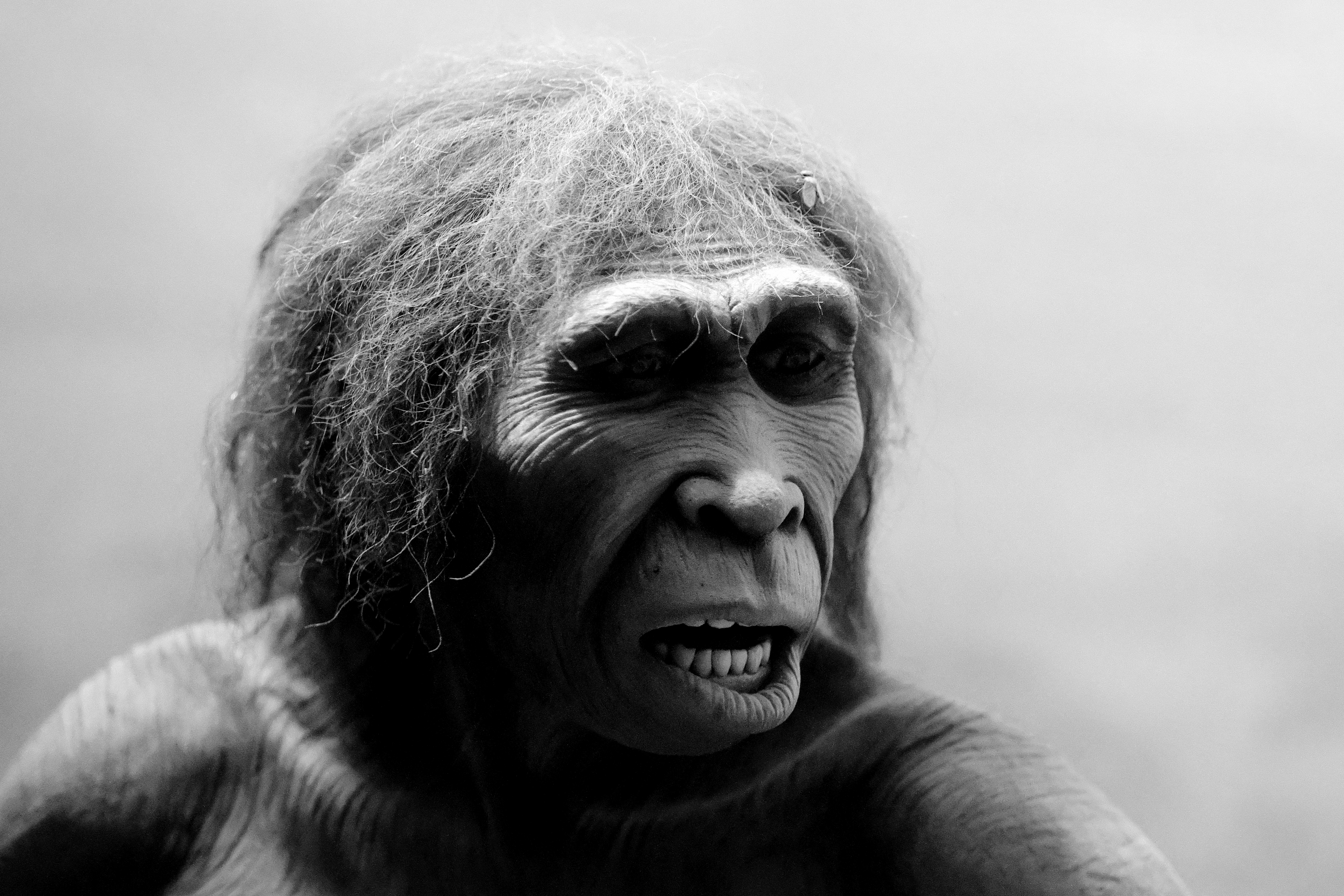
Reconstruction of H. ergaster, American Museum of Natural History

The only well-preserved post-cranial remains of H. ergaster come from the Turkana Boy fossil. Unlike the australopithecines, Turkana Boy's arms were not longer relative to their legs than the arms of living people and the cone-shaped torso of their ancestors had evolved into a more barrel-shaped chest over narrow hips, another similarity to modern humans. The tibia (shin bone) of Turkana Boy is relatively longer than the same bone in modern humans, potentially meaning that there was more bend in the knee when walking. The slim and long build of Turkana Boy may be explained by H. ergaster living in hot and arid, seasonal environments. Through thinning of the body, body volume decreases faster than skin area and greater skin area means more effective heat dissipation.

H. ergaster individuals were significantly taller than their ancestors. Whereas Lucy, a famous Australopithecus fossil, would only have been about 1 m (3 ft 3 in) tall at her death, Turkana Boy was about 1.62 m (5 ft 4 in) tall and would probably have reached 1.82 m (6 ft) or more if he had survived to adulthood. Adult H. ergaster are believed to have ranged in size from about 1.45 to 1.85 m (4 ft 9 in to 6 ft 1 in) tall.

Because of being adapted to a hot and arid climate, H. ergaster might also have been the earliest human species to have nearly hairless and naked skin. If instead H. ergaster had an ape-like covering of body hair, sweating (the primary means through which modern humans prevent their brains and bodies from overheating) would not have been as efficient. Though sweating is the generally accepted explanation for hairlessness, other proposed explanations include a reduction of parasite load and sexual selection. It is doubtful if australopithecines and earlier Homo were sufficiently mobile to make hair loss an advantageous trait, whereas H. ergaster was clearly adapted for long-distance travel and noted for inhabiting lower altitudes (and open, hot savannah environments) than their ancestors. Australopithecines typically inhabited colder and higher altitudes 1,000–1,600 m (3,300–5,200 ft), where nighttime temperatures would have gotten significantly colder and insulating body hair may have been required.

Alternatively and despite this, the loss of body hair could have occurred significantly earlier than H. ergaster. Though skin impressions are unknown in any extinct hominin, it is possible that human ancestors were already losing their body hair around 3 million years ago. Human ancestors acquired pubic lice from gorillas about 3 million years ago, and speciation of human from gorilla pubic lice was potentially only possible because human ancestors had lost most of their body hair by this early date. It is also possible that the loss of body hair occurred at a significantly later date. Genetic analysis suggests that high activity in the melanocortin 1 receptor, which produces dark skin, dates back to about 1.2 million years ago. This could indicate the evolution of hairlessness around this time, as a lack of body hair would have left the skin exposed to harmful UV radiation.

=== Skull and face ===
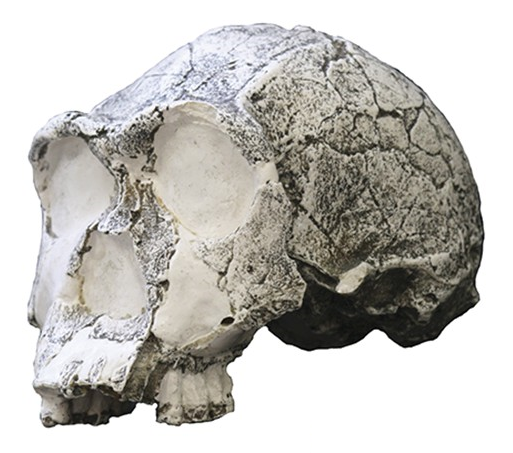
KNM ER 3733, a famous Homo ergaster skull

Differences to modern humans would have been readily apparent in the face and skull of H. ergaster. Turkana Boy's brain was almost fully grown at the time of his death, but its volume (at 880 cc) was only about 130 cc greater than the maximum found in H. habilis, about 500 cc below the average of modern humans. The 130 cc increase from H. habilis becomes much less significant than what could be presumed when the larger body size of Turkana Boy and H. ergaster is considered. With all H. ergaster skulls considered, the brain volume of the species mostly varied between 600 and 910 cc, with some small examples only having a volume of 508–580 cc. Since their brain was smaller than that of modern humans, the skull of H. ergaster immediately narrowed behind the eye sockets (post-orbital constriction).

The brain case was long and low, and Turkana Boy's forehead was flat and receding, merging at an angle with the brow ridge above their eyes. A noticeable difference between Turkana Boy and the australopithecines and H. habilis would have been their nose, which would have been similar to that of modern humans in projecting forwards and having nostrils oriented downwards. This external nose may have also been an adaptation towards a warmer climate, since the noses of modern humans are usually cooler than their central bodies, condensing moisture that would otherwise have been exhaled and lost during periods of increased activity. The face of Turkana Boy would have been longer from top to bottom than that of modern humans, with the jaws projecting farther outwards (prognathism). Though the jaws and teeth were smaller than those of the average australopithecine and H. habilis, they were still significantly larger than those of modern humans. Since the jaw slanted sharply backwards, it is probable that they were chinless.

The overall structure of Turkana Boy's skull and face is also reflected in other H. ergaster skulls, which combine large and outwardly projecting faces with brow ridges, receding foreheads, large teeth and projecting nasal bones. Though Turkana Boy would have been no more than 12 years old when he died, their stature is more similar to that of a modern 15-year-old and the brain is comparable to that of a modern 1-year-old. By modern standards, H. ergaster would thus have been cognitively limited, though the invention of new tools prove that they were more intelligent than their predecessors.

=== Body mass and sexual dimorphism ===
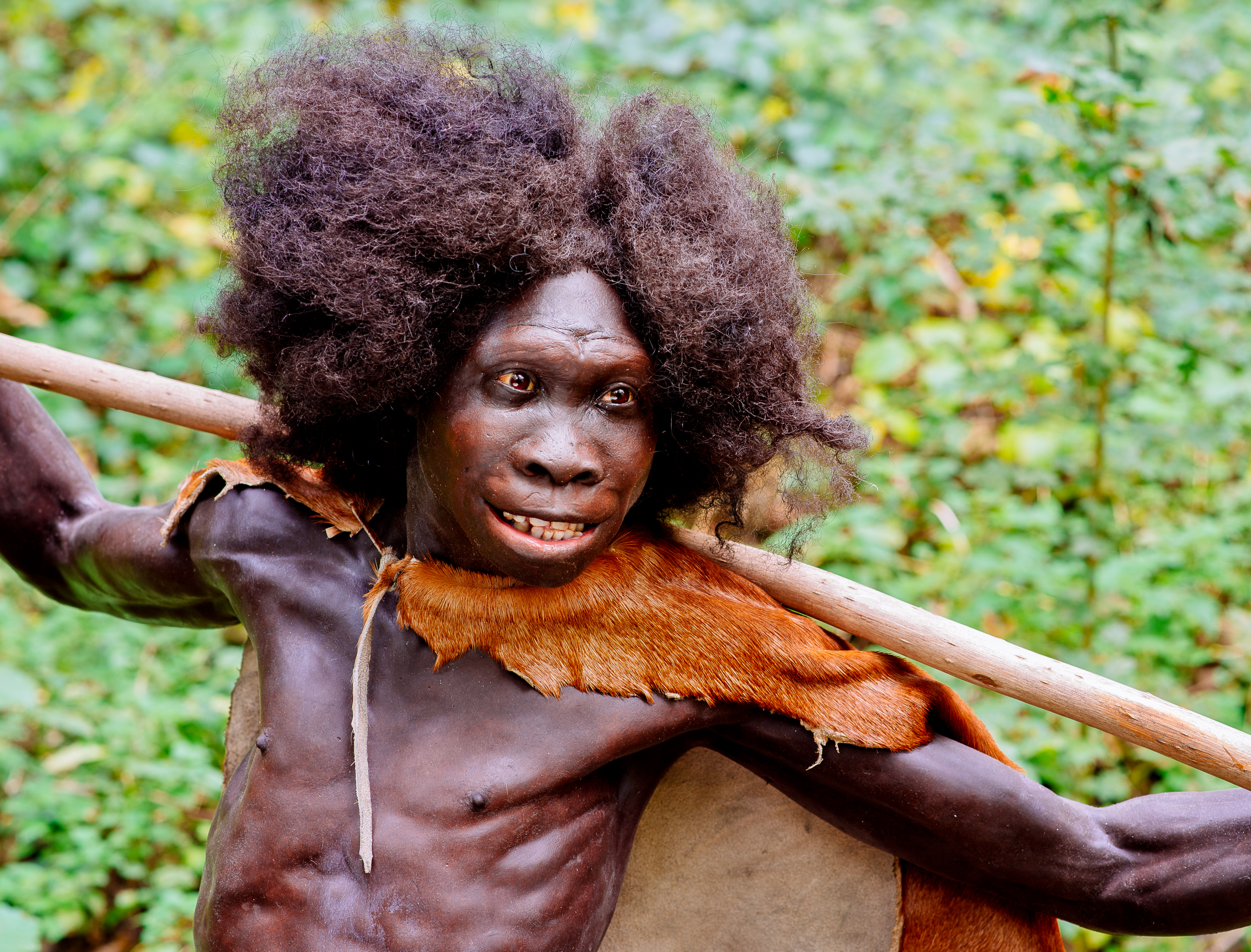
Reconstruction of Turkana boy by Adrie and Alfons Kennis at the Neanderthal Museum

H. ergaster possessed a significantly larger body mass in comparison to earlier hominins such as early Homo, Australopithecus and Paranthropus. Whereas australopithecines typically ranged in weight from 29–48 kg (64–106 lbs), H. ergaster typically ranged in weight from 52–63 kg (115–139 lbs). It is possible that the increased body size was the result of life in an open savannah environment, where increased size gives the ability to exploit broader diets in larger foraging areas, increases mobility and also gives the ability to hunt larger prey. The increased body mass also means that parents would have been able to carry their children to an older age and larger mass.

Though reduced sexual dimorphism has often been cited historically as one of the radical differences between H. ergaster and earlier Homo and australopithecines, it is unclear whether australopithecines were significantly more sexually diamorphic than H. ergaster or modern humans. Skeletal evidence suggests that sexes in H. ergaster differed no more in size than sexes in modern humans do, but a 2003 study by palaeoanthropologists Philip L. Reno, Richard S. Meindl, Melanie A. McCollum and C. Owen Lovejoy suggested that the same was also true for the significantly earlier Australopithecus afarensis. Sexual dimorphism is difficult to measure in extinct species since the sex of fossils is usually not determinable. Historically, scientists have typically measured differences between the extreme ends (in terms of size and morphology) of the fossil material attributed to a species and assumed that the resulting ratio applies to the mean difference between male and female individuals.

=== Growth and development ===
The dimensions of a 1.8 million years old adult female H. ergaster pelvis from Gona, Ethiopia suggests that H. ergaster would have been capable of birthing children with a maximum prenatal (pre-birth) brain size of 315 cc, about 30–50% of adult brain size. This value falls intermediately between that of chimpanzees (~40%) and modern humans (28%). Further conclusions about the growth and development in early Homo can be drawn from the Mojokerto child, a ~1.4–1.5-million-year-old ~one-year-old Asian H. erectus, which had a brain at about 72–84% the size of an adult H. erectus brain, which suggests a brain growth trajectory more similar to that of other great apes than of modern humans. Both the Gona pelvis and the Mojokerto child suggest that the prenatal growth of H. ergaster was similar to that of modern humans but that the postnatal (post-birth) growth and development was intermediate between that of chimpanzees and modern humans. The faster development rate suggests that altriciality (an extended childhood and a long period of dependency on your parents) evolved at a later stage in human evolution, possibly in the last common ancestor of Neanderthals and modern humans. The faster development rate might also indicate that the expected lifespan of H. ergaster and H. erectus was lower than that of later and modern humans.

== Culture ==
=== Diet and energetics ===
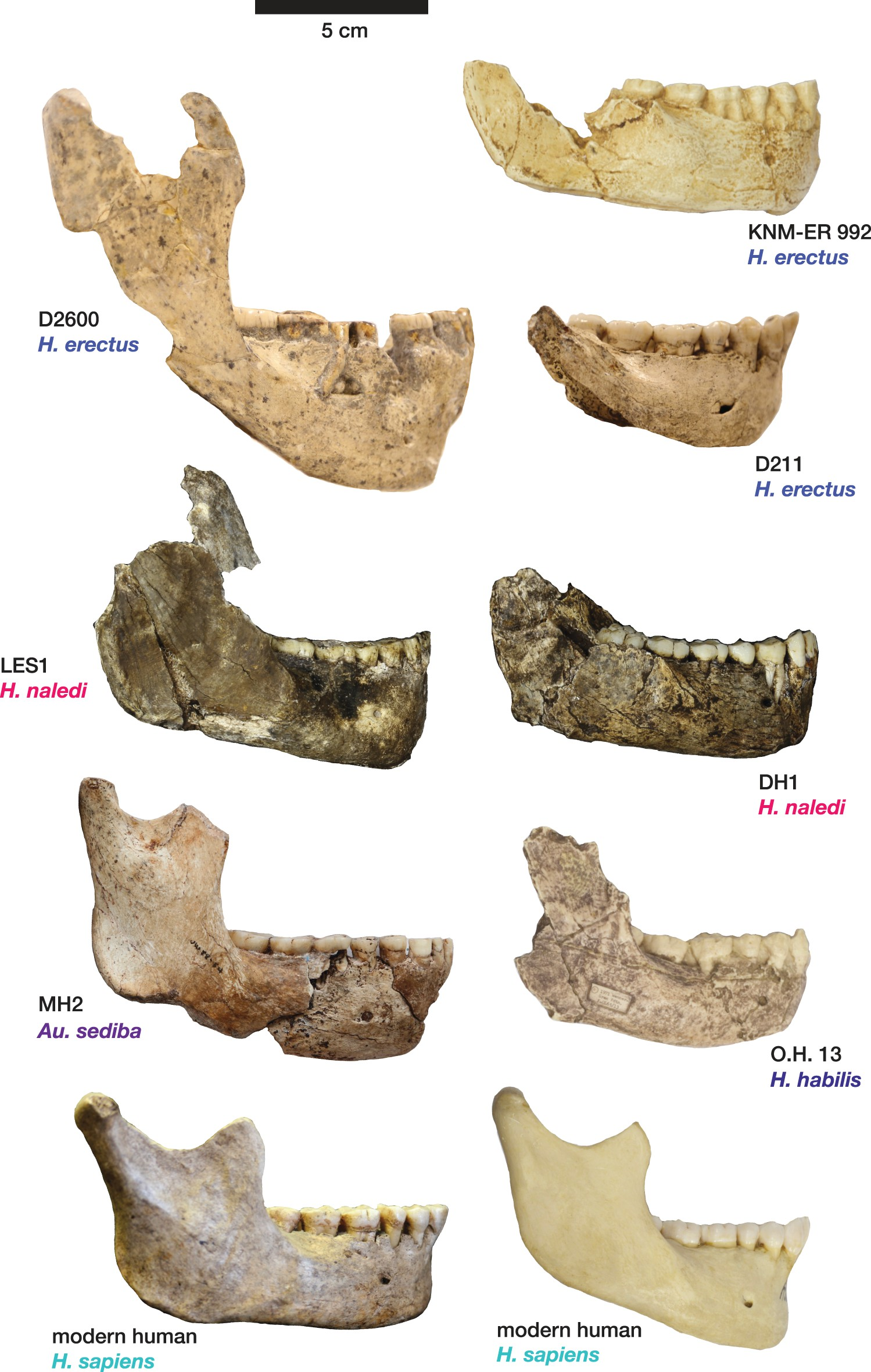
Jaw of Homo ergaster (KNM ER 992 in the top-right, labelled as Homo erectus in the image) compared to jaws of other members of the genus Homo

It is frequently assumed that the larger body and brain size of H. ergaster, compared to its ancestors, would have brought with it increased dietary and energy needs. In 2002, palaeoanthropologists Leslie C. Aiello and Jonathan C. K. Wells stated that the average resting metabolic requirements of H. ergaster would have been 39% higher than those of Australopithecus afarensis, 30% higher in males and 54% higher in females. However, the torso proportions of H. ergaster implies a relatively small gut, which means that energy needs might not necessarily have been higher in H. ergaster than in earlier hominins. This is because the earlier ape (and australopithecine) gut was large and energy-expensive since it needed to synthesize fat through fermenting plant matter, whereas H. ergaster likely ate significantly more animal fat than their predecessors. This would have allowed more energy to be diverted to brain growth, increasing brain size while maintaining the energy requirements of earlier species.

If they had increased energy requirements, H. ergaster would have needed to eat either vastly more food than australopithecines, or would have needed to eat food of superior quality. If they ate the same type of foods as the australopithecines, feeding time would then have had to be dramatically increased in proportion to the extra calories required, reducing the time H. ergaster could use for resting, socialising and travelling. Though this would have been possible, it is considered unlikely, especially since the jaws and teeth of H. ergaster are reduced in size compared to those of the australopithecines, suggesting a shift in diet away from fibrous and difficult-to-chew foods. Regardless of energy needs, the small gut of H. ergaster also suggests a more easily digested diet composed of food of higher quality.

It is likely that H. ergaster consumed meat in higher proportions than the earlier australopithecines. Meat was probably acquired through a combination of ambushes, active hunting and confrontational scavenging. H. ergaster must not only have possessed the ability of endurance running, but must also have been able to defend themselves and the carcasses of their prey from the variety of contemporary African predators. It is possible that a drop in African carnivoran species variety around 1.5 million years ago can be ascribed to competition with opportunistic and carnivorous hominins.

On its own, meat might not have been able to fully sustain H. ergaster. Modern humans can not sufficiently metabolize protein to meet more than 50% of their energy needs and modern humans who heavily rely on animal-based products in their diet mostly rely on fat to sustain the rest of their energy requirements. Multiple reasons make a fully meat-based diet in H. ergaster unlikely, the most prominent being that African ungulates (the primary prey available) are relatively low in fat and that high meat diets demand increased intake of water, which would have been difficult in an open and hot environment. Modern African hunter-gatherers who rely heavily on meat, such as the Hadza and San peoples, also use cultural means to recover the maximum amount of fat from the carcasses of their prey, a method that would not have been available to H. ergaster.

H. ergaster would thus likely have consumed large quantities of meat, vastly more than their ancestors, but would also have had to make use of a variety of other food sources, such as seeds, honey, nuts, invertebrates, nutritious tubers, bulbs and other underground plant storage organs. The relatively small chewing capacity of H. ergaster, in comparison to its larger-jawed ancestors, means that the meat and high quality plant food consumed would likely have required the use of tools to process before eating.

=== Social structure and dynamics ===
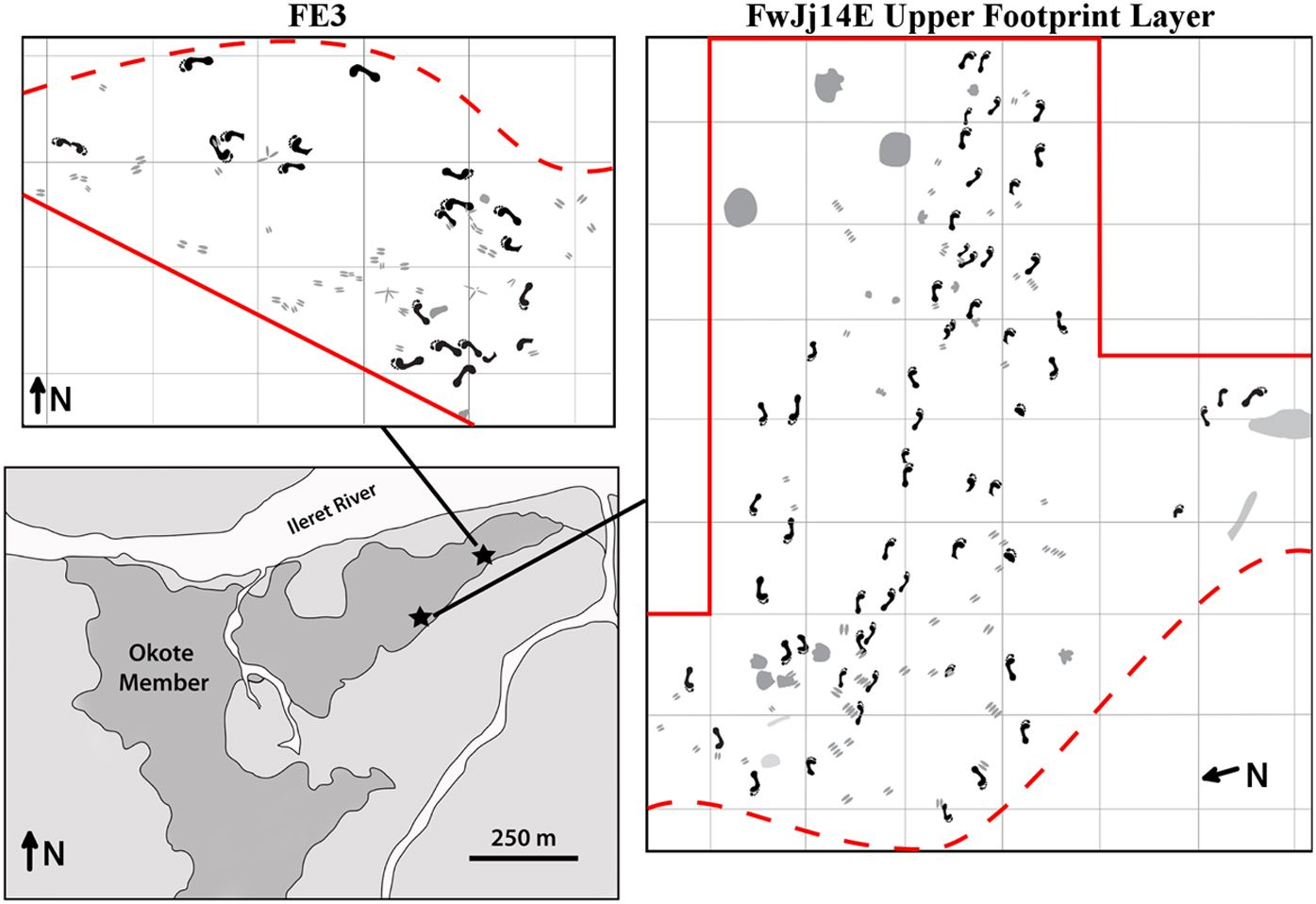
Diagram of fossil trackways from two sites near Ileret, Kenya attributed to Homo ergaster/Homo erectus

H. ergaster lived on the African savannah, which during the Pleistocene was home to a considerably more formidable community of carnivorans than the present savannah. Hominins could probably only have adapted to life on the savannah if effective anti-predator defense behaviours had already evolved. Defense against predators would likely have come through H. ergaster living in large groups, possessing stone (and presumably wooden) tools and effective counter-attack behaviour having been established. In modern primates that spend significant amounts of time on the savannah, such as chimpanzees and savannah baboons, individuals form large, multi-male, groups wherein multiple males can effectively work together to fend off and counter-attack predators, occasionally with the use of stones or sticks, and protect the rest of the group. It is possible that similar behaviour was exhibited in early Homo. Based on the male-bonded systems within bonobos and chimpanzees, and the tendency towards male bonding in modern foragers, groups of early Homo might have been male-bonded as well. Because of the scarcity of fossil material, group size in early Homo cannot be determined with any certainty. Groups were probably large, it is possible groups were above the upper range of known group sizes among chimpanzees and baboons (c. 100 individuals or more). In 1993, palaeoanthropologists Leslie C. Aiello and R. I. M. Dunbar estimated that the group size of H. habilis and H. rudolfensis, based on neocortex size (as there is a known relationship between neocortex size and group size in modern non-human primates), would have ranged from about 70–85 individuals. With the additional factor of bipedalism, which is energetically cheaper than quadrupedalism, the maximum ecologically tolerable group size may have been even larger. Aiello's and Dunbar's group size estimates in regards to H. ergaster was 91–116 individuals.

Social and counter-attack behaviour of earlier Homo probably carried over into H. ergaster, where they are likely to have developed even further. H. ergaster was probably the first primate to move into the niche of social carnivore (i. e. hunter-gatherer). Such behaviour would probably have been the result of counter-attacks in the context of competition over nutritious food with other carnivores and would probably have evolved from something akin to the opportunistic hunting sometimes exhibited by chimpanzees. The switch to predation in groups might have triggered a cascade of evolutionary changes which changed the course of human evolution. Cooperative behaviours such as opportunistic hunting in groups, predator defense and confrontational scavenging would have been critical for survival which means that a fundamental transition in psychology gradually transpired. With the typical "competitive cooperation" behaviour exhibited by most primates no longer being favored through natural selection and social tendencies taking its place, hunting, and other activities, would have become true collaborative efforts. Because counter-attack behaviour is typically exhibited in males of modern primates, social hunting in archaic humans is believed to have been a primarily male activity. Females likely conducted other types of foraging, gathering food which did not require hunting (i.e. fruits, nuts, eggs, etc.).

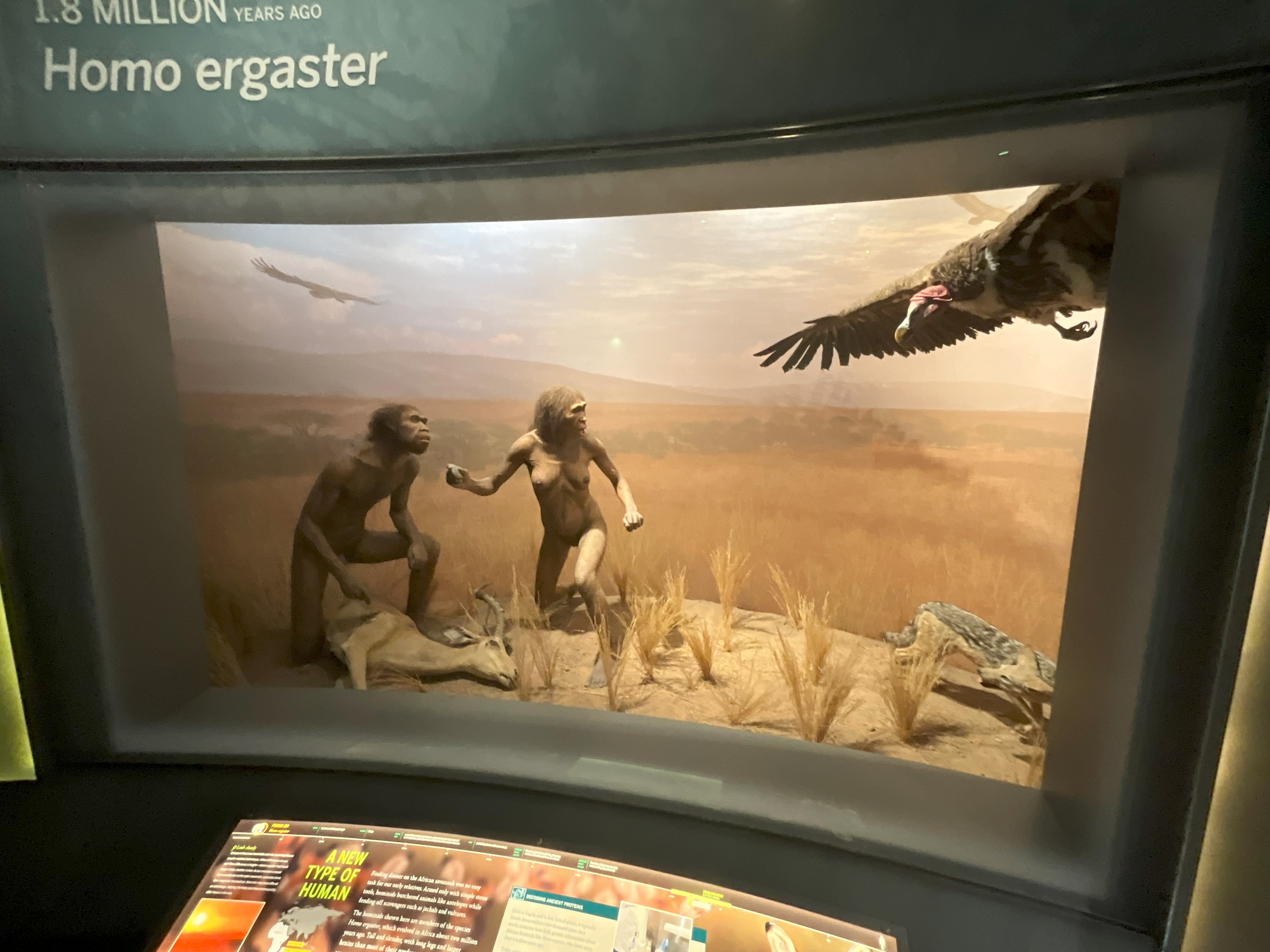
Reconstruction of H. ergaster, American Museum of Natural History

With hunting being a social activity, individuals probably shared the meat with one another, which would have strengthened the bonds both between the hunters themselves and between the hunters and the rest of the H. ergaster group. Females likely shared what they had foraged with the rest of the group as well. This development could have led to the development of male-female friendships into opportunistic monogamous pair bonds. Since sexual selection from females probably favored males that could hunt, the emerging social behaviour resulting from these new behaviours would have been carried over and amplified through the generations.

The only direct evidence of H. ergaster group composition comes from a series of sites outside of Ileret in Kenya, where 97 footprints made around 1.5 million years ago by a group of at least 20 individuals have been preserved. Based on the size of the footprints, one of the trackways appears to have been a group entirely composed of males, possibly a specialised task group, such as a border patrol or a hunting or foraging party. If this assessment is correct, this would further suggest a male-female division of responsibilities. In modern hunter-gatherer societies who target large prey items, male parties are typically dispatched to bring down these high-risk animals, and, due to the low success rate, female parties tend to focus on more predictable foods.

=== Technology ===
==== Tool production ====
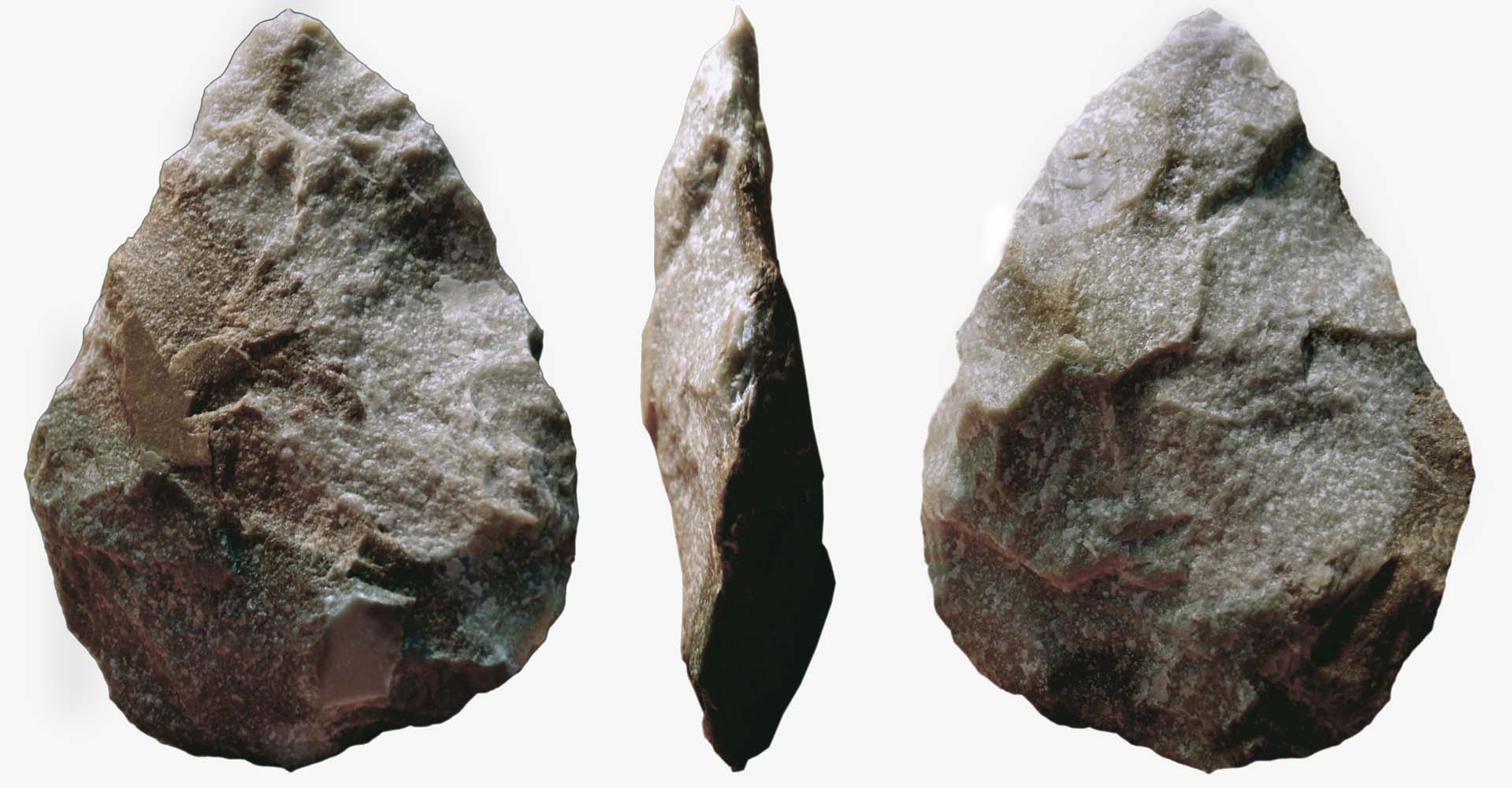
A cordiform hand axe as commonly found in the Acheulean (replica)

Early H. ergaster inherited the Oldowan culture of tools from australopithecines and earlier Homo, though they quickly learnt to strike much larger stone flakes than their predecessors and contemporaries. By 1.65 million years ago, H. ergaster had created the extensively flaked artefacts and early hand axes that mark the Acheulean culture, and by 1.6–1.4 million years ago, the new tool industry was widely established in East Africa. Acheulean tools differ from Oldowan tools in that the core forms of the tools were clearly deliberate. Whereas the shape of the core forms in Oldowan tools, which were probably used mostly as hammers to crack bones for marrow, appears to not have mattered much, the hand axes of the Acheulean culture demonstrate an intent to produce narrow and sharp objects, typically in teardrop, oval or triangular shapes. Once in place, the Acheulean industry remained unchanged throughout H. ergaster's existence and later times, with tools produced near its end about 250,000 years ago not being significantly different from tools produced 1.65 million years ago.

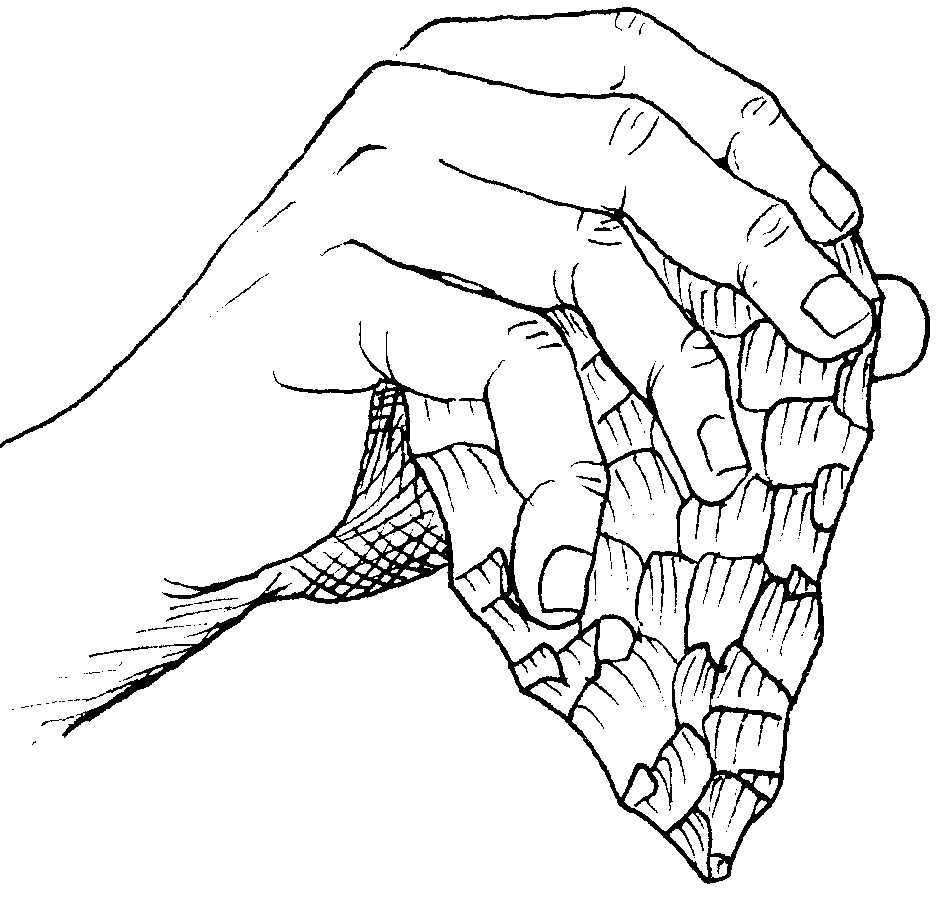
Drawing of a hand holding a hand axe

The oldest Acheulean assemblages also preserve core forms similar to those in Oldowan tools, but there are no known true intermediate forms between the two, suggesting that the appearance of Acheulean tools was an abrupt and sudden development. The most significant development that led to the Acheulean tools was likely early hominins learning the ability to strike large flakes, up to 30 cm (1 ft) or more in length, from larger boulders, from which they could manufacture new tools such as hand axes. Though "hand axe" implies that all hand axes were used for chopping and were hand-held, they came in a variety of different shapes and size and probably served several different functions. Carefully shaped and symmetric examples may have been hurled at prey akin to modern discuses, more casually made examples may simply have served as portable sources for sharp flakes and some could have been used for scraping or chopping wood. Additionally, hand axes are effective butchering tools and were possibly also used for dismembering carcasses of large animals.

There are preserved hand axes that are too unwieldy and large to be used for any apparent practical purpose. The use of these larger hand axes, and for some discovered collections of hundreds of hand axes without obvious signs of use, is speculative and conjectural. An idea that has been popular in the popular press, and frequently cited in academia, is that large and impressive hand axes might have been emblems used for attracting mates, with makers of large axes showing strength, coordination and determination, qualities that may have been regarded as attractive. Palaeoanthropologists April Nowell and Melanie Lee Chang noted in 2009 that though this theory is "both intriguing and emotionally appealing", there is little evidence for it and it is untestable. They considered it more probable that variations in hand axe morphology over the course of hundreds of thousands of years was the result of various different factors rather than a single, overarching factor in sexual selection.

==== Fire ====
As Homo migrated into open savannah environments, encounters with natural fires must have become more frequent and significant. It is possible that H. ergaster were the earliest humans to master the control of fire, which they may have used for cooking purposes. Cooking renders both meat and plant foods more digestible, which might have been important since the guts of H. ergaster were reduced in size compared to those of their ancestors. Though H. ergaster/H. erectus is frequently assumed to have been the earliest Homo to control fire, concrete evidence is somewhat lacking in the fossil record, perhaps partly due to the difficulty for actual evidence of fire usage to be preserved. Two of the earliest sites commonly claimed to preserve evidence of fire usage are FxJj20 at Koobi Fora and GnJi 1/6E near Lake Baringo, both in Kenya and both dated as up to 1.5 million years old. The evidence at FxJj20 consists of burned sediments and heat-altered stone tools, whereas GnJi 1/6E preserves large clasts of baked clay, associated with stone tools and faunal remains. Though it is difficult to exclude a natural origin for the fire residue evidenced, the sites remain strong candidates for early fire use.

Several sites, preserving more widely accepted evidence of fire usage, have been dated to 1 million years ago or earlier, postdating the emergence and last generally accepted record of H. ergaster. These sites include cave sites, such as Wonderwerk and Swartkrans in South Africa, and open sites, such as Kalambo Falls in Zambia. The site Gesher Benot Ya'aqov in Israel, dated to about 700,000 years ago, preserves widely accepted evidence of fire usage through burnt materials and burnt flint microartefacts being preserved at numerous levels. From around 400,000 years ago and onwards, traces of fire become even more numerous in sites across Africa, Europe and Asia.

=== Language ===
The spinal cord of Turkana Boy would have been narrower than that of modern humans, which means that the nervous system of H. ergaster, and their respiratory muscles, may not have been developed enough to produce or control speech. In 2001, anthropologists Bruce Latimer and James Ohman concluded that Turkana Boy was afflicted by skeletal dysplasia and scoliosis, and thus would not have been representative of the rest of his species in this respect. In 2006, when anthropologist Marc Meyer and colleagues described a H. erectus s.l. specimen from Dmanisi, Georgia, dated to 1.78 million years old. The fossil preserves the oldest known Homo vertebrae and the spine found falls within the range of modern human spines, suggesting that the individual would have been capable of speech. Meyer and colleagues concluded that speech was probably possible within Homo very early on and that Turkana Boy probably suffered from some congenital defect, possibly spinal stenosis.

In 2013 and 2014, anthropologist Regula Schiess and colleagues concluded that there was no evidence of any congenital defects in Turkana Boy, and, in contrast to the 2001 and 2006 studies, considered the specimen to be representative of the species.

== See also ==
- List of fossil sites
- List of human evolution fossils
