= KNM-ER 992 =

Hominin fossil

KNM ER 992
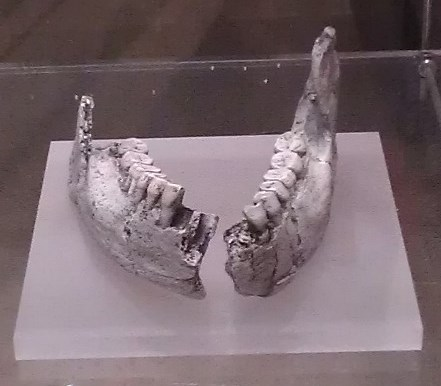
- KNM ER 992 replica
- Catalog no.: KNM ER 992
- Species: Homo ergaster
- Age: 1.5 mya
- Place discovered: Koobi Fora, Kenya
- Date discovered: 1971
- Discovered by: Richard Leakey
- Originally thought to be Homo habilis; reclassified as Homo ergaster in 1975

KNM ER 992 is a 1.5 million years old fossilized lower jaw discovered by Richard Leakey in 1971 at Lake Turkana, Kenya. The mandible was considered by C. Groves and V. Mazak to be the holotype specimen for Homo ergaster.

== See also ==
- List of fossil sites (with link directory)
- List of hominina (hominin) fossils (with images)
