= KNM ER 3733 =

Hominin fossil

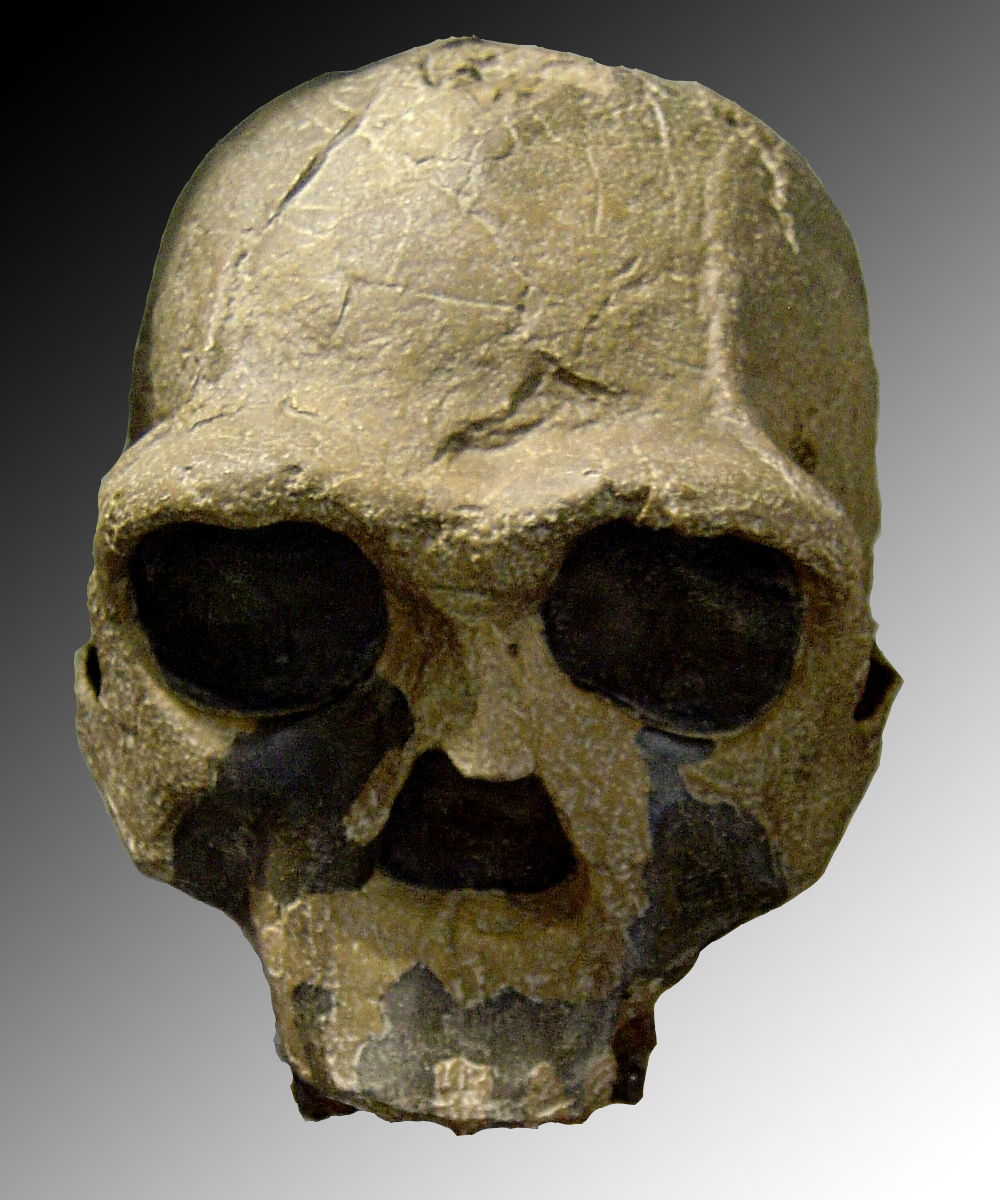
- Catalog no.: KNM ER 3733
- Species: Homo ergaster
- Age: 1.63±0.15 Mya
- Place discovered: Koobi Fora, Kenya
- Date discovered: 1975

KNM ER 3733 (Note: "KNM ER" refers to "Kenya National Museum, East Rudolf", and "KNM WT" to "Kenya National Museum, West Turkana", which are the locations of discovery.) is a fossilized hominid cranium of the extinct hominid Homo ergaster, alternatively referred to as African Homo erectus. It was discovered in 1975 in Koobi Fora, Kenya, right next to Lake Turkana, in a survey led by Richard Leakey, by a field worker called Bernard Ngeneo.

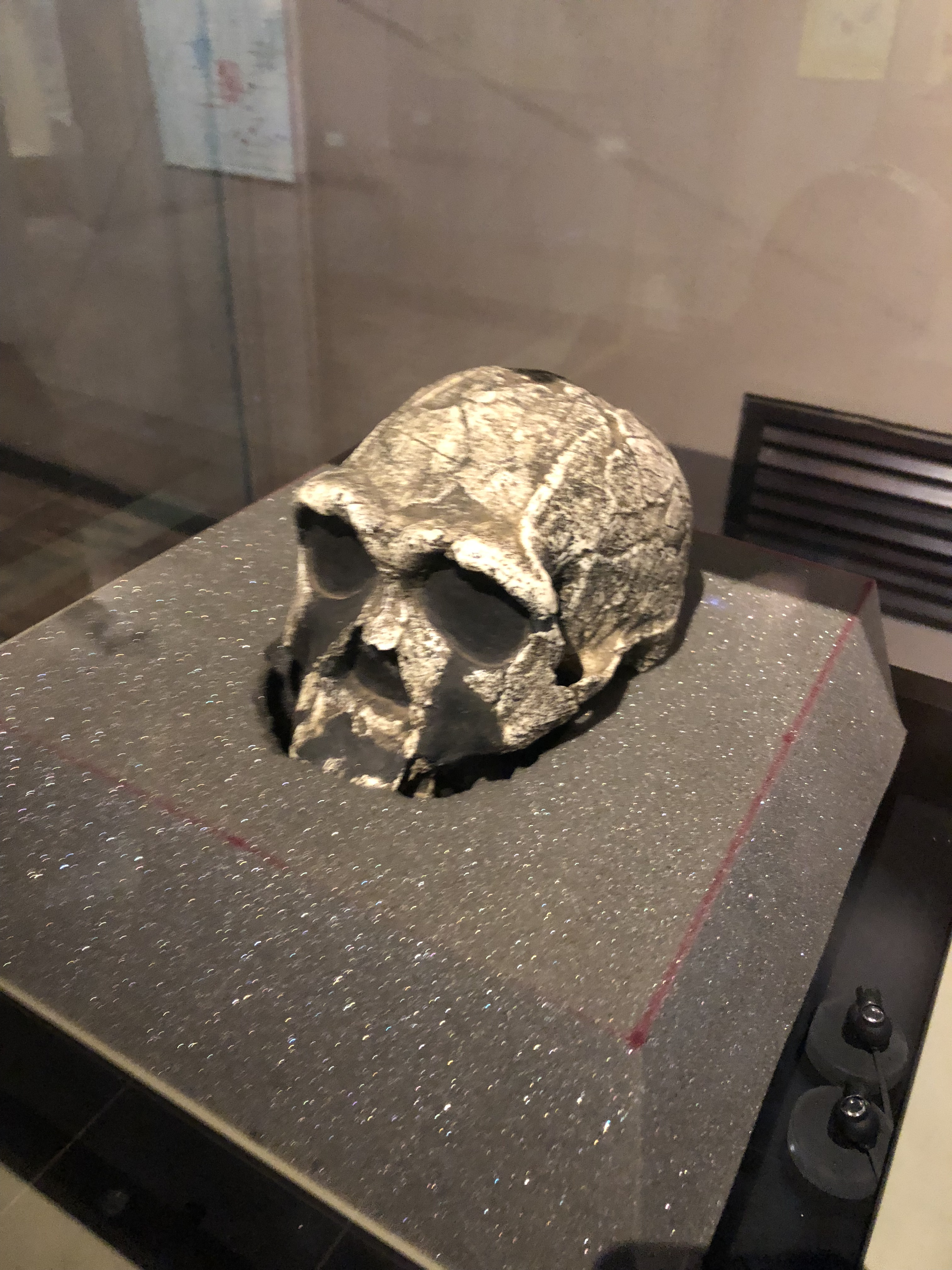
KNM ER 3733 on display at a National Museum of Kenya

KNM ER 3733 is one of the oldest Homo ergaster skulls in the world. Recent research using magnetostratigraphy has determined the age of KNM-ER 3733 to be 1.63±0.15 million years old.

KNM ER 3733 is a find of a near-complete cranium. Its brain size is about 850ccm. KNM ER 3733 was compared to male fossils KNM ER 3883 and KNM WT 15000 (Turkana Boy), who were also found at the Koobi Fora site, and conjectured to be female. The features of KNM ER 3733 are less robust compared to the two male crania. It is considered an adult because of the extensive wear of its teeth, the fact that its third molars were present before the individual died, and because its cranial sutures were fully fused, which is only possible in adult specimen.

== See also ==
- List of fossil sites
- List of human evolution fossils
- KNM WT 15000 ("Turkana Boy")
- KNM-ER 1470 (Homo rudolfensis)
