= KNM ER 3883 =

Fossilized skull

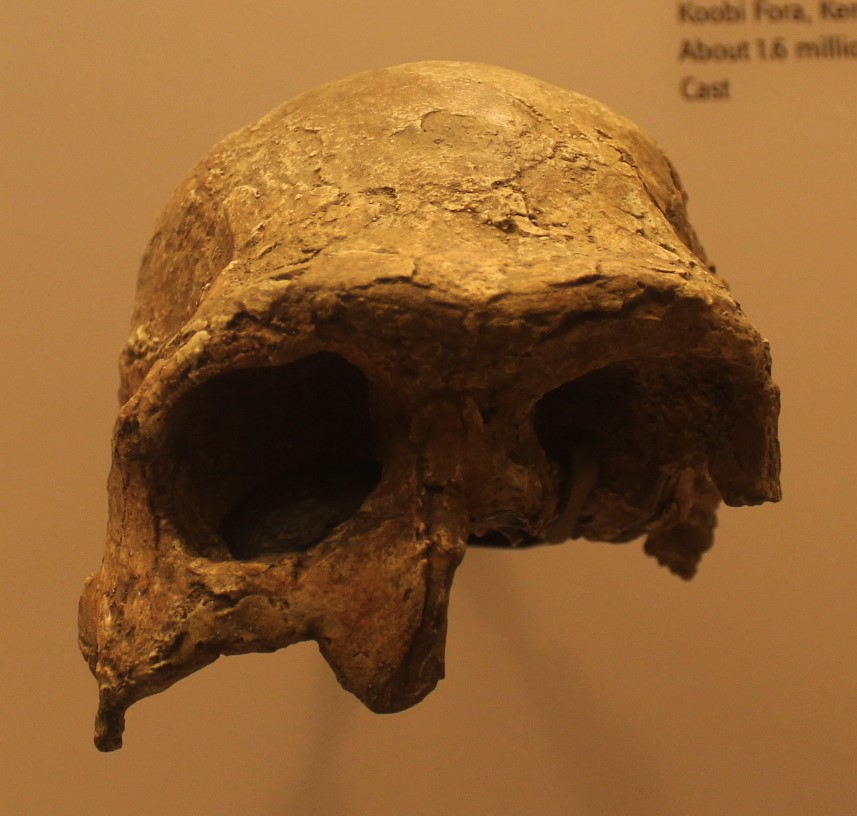
- Catalog no.: KNM ER 3883
- Species: Homo ergaster/erectus
- Age: 1.5–1.6 Ma
- Place discovered: Koobi Fora, east of Lake Turkana (formerly lake Rudolf), Kenya
- Date discovered: 1976
- Discovered by: Richard Leakey

KNM ER 3883 is the catalogue number of a fossilized skull (Partial cranium) of the species Homo ergaster (alternatively referred to as African Homo erectus). The fossil was discovered by Richard Leakey in 1976 in Koobi Fora, east of Lake Turkana (formerly lake Rudolf), Kenya.

== Observations ==
KNM-ER 3883 is a significant fossil specimen of early African Homo erectus, dating to approximately 1.5–1.6 million years ago. This cranium, discovered in Kenya, has an endocranial volume exceeding 800 cc, which is substantially larger than earlier Homo species and suggests a notable increase in brain size. The cranium is long and low and it has postorbital constriction. It has a large face and zygomatic bone. It shows a cranial capacity greater than any previous hominid capacity which is estimated at 804 ml.
