= Turkana Boy =

Fossil hominin skeleton

Turkana Boy, Nariokotome Boy
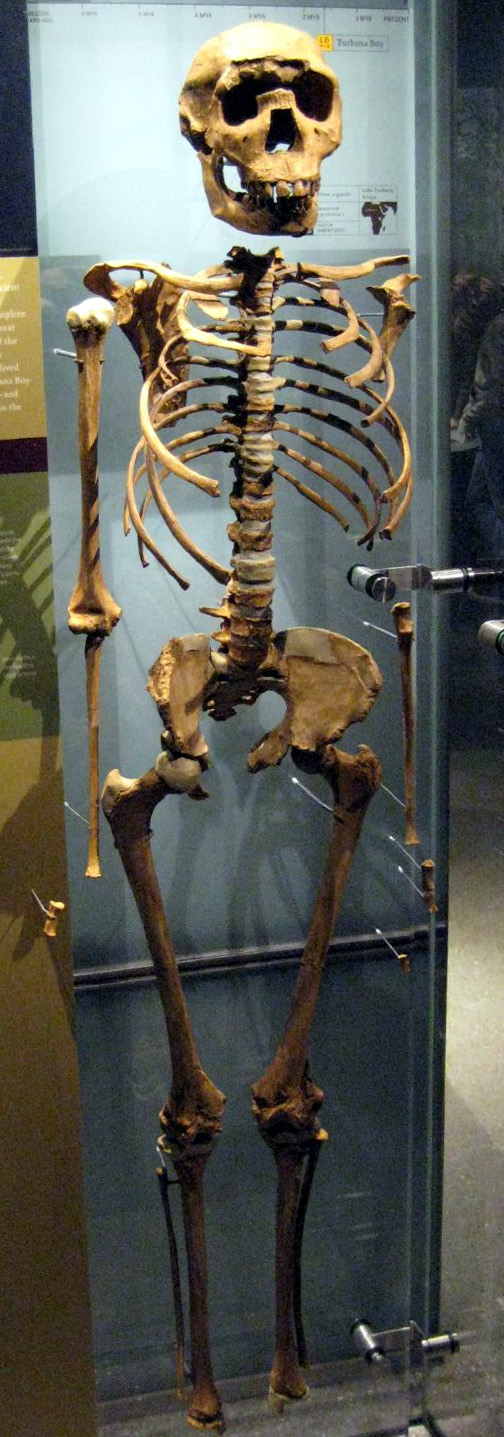
- Cast at the American Museum of Natural History
- Catalog no.: KNM-WT 15000
- Common name: Turkana Boy, Nariokotome Boy
- Species: Homo erectus
- Age: 1.5 - 1.6 mya
- Place discovered: Lake Turkana, Kenya
- Date discovered: 1984
- Discovered by: Kamoya Kimeu; Richard Leakey

Turkana Boy, also called Nariokotome Boy, is the name given to fossil KNM-WT 15000, a nearly complete skeleton of a Homo erectus youth who lived 1.5 to 1.6 million years ago. This specimen is the most complete Homo erectus skeleton ever found. Some authorities designate it as Homo ergaster.

It was discovered in 1984 by Kamoya Kimeu on the bank of the Nariokotome River near Lake Turkana in Kenya.

Estimates of the individual's age at death range from 7 to 11 years old.

== Adolescence and maturity ==
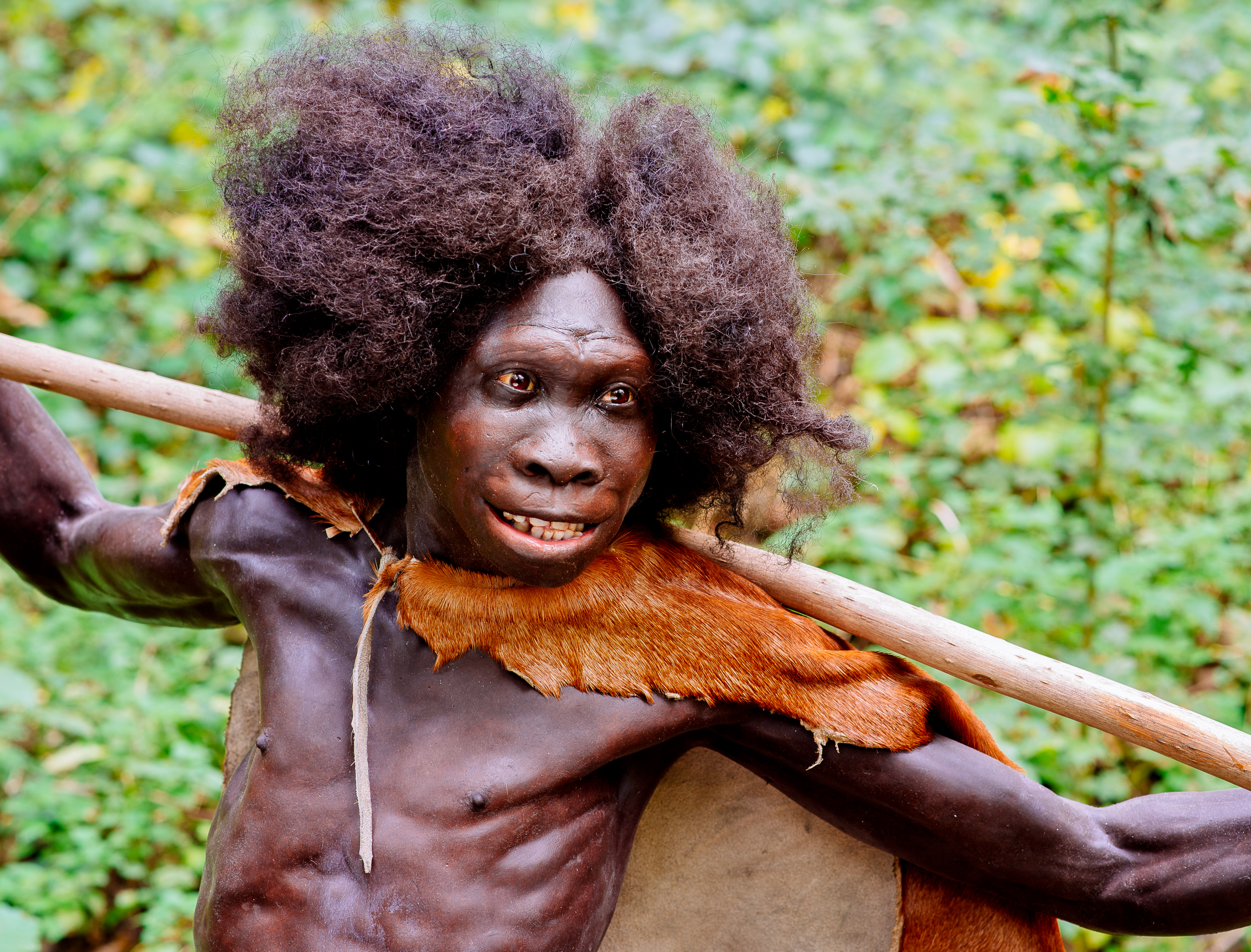
Turkana boy reconstruction displayed at the Neanderthal Museum.

Although the specimen is largely considered male due to the shape of the pelvis, the sex is ultimately undetermined due to its prepubescent age. Estimates of the age at death depend on whether the maturity stage of the teeth or skeleton is used, and whether that maturity is compared to that of Homo sapiens or to chimpanzees. A key factor is that modern humans have a marked adolescent growth spurt, whereas chimpanzees do not. Initial research assumed a modern human type of growth, but recent evidence from other fossils suggests this was less present in early hominins. This difference affects the estimates of both the age and the likely stature of the specimen as a fully grown adult.

Alan Walker and Richard Leakey in 1993 estimated the boy to have been about 11–12 years old based on known rates of bone maturity. (Note: Walker explains: "in KNM-WT 15000, his skeletal development can only be used to place an upper limit of about 14 years on his age at death. However, a less often recognized skeletal maturational event does generally occur prior to 14 years in modern males – the union of the trochlea and capitulum (and also the lateral epicondyle) of the humerus, prior to their joint union with the humeral shaft.... That these elements were fused in KNM-WT 15000 (at least the capitulum and trochlea) suggests a skeletal age for him of somewhat more than 11 years.... In either event, 11 to 12 years would seem to be the best compromise figure to use for his chronological age at death." (Walker & Leakey, 1993, p. 235)) Walker and Leakey (1993) said that dental dating often gives a younger age than a person's actual age. (Note: "Just as in the case of human dental age (above), estimates based on tooth formation give slightly younger ages than those based on emergence." (Walker & Leakey, 1993, p. 207))

Christopher Dean (M. C. Dean) of University College London, in a 2009 Nova special, estimated that the Turkana Boy was 8 years old at death.

== Morphology ==
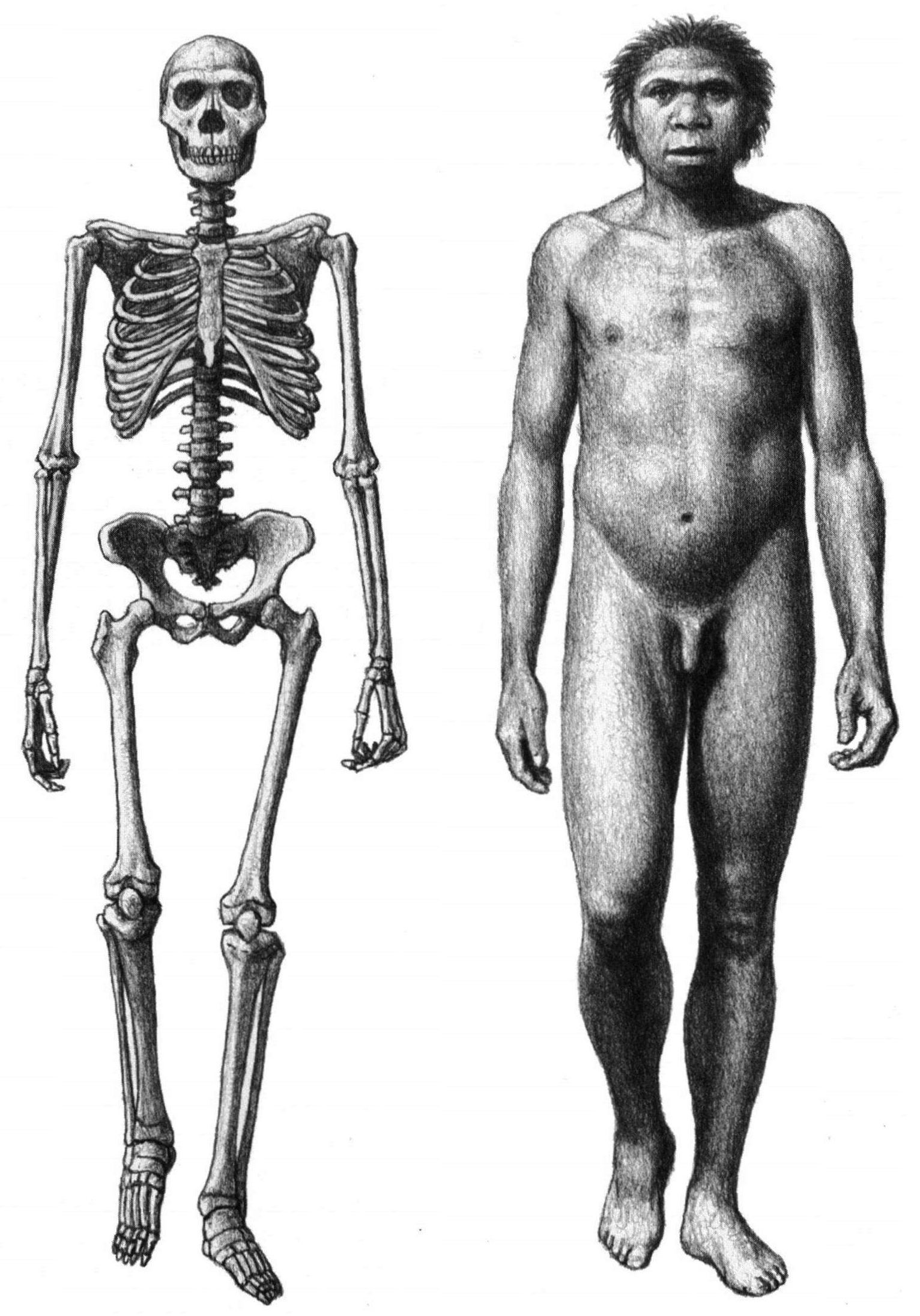
Skeleton and a life reconstruction of the Turkana Boy

The specimen comprises 108 bones, making it the most complete early human skeleton discovered. A 2018 study estimates that he was 154 cm (5 ft 1 in) tall and weighed 51–54 kg (112–119 lb) when he died. In adulthood, Turkana Boy might have reached 160–178 cm (5 ft 3 in – 5 ft 10 in) tall and massed 60–83 kg (132–183 lb). The pelvis is narrower than in Homo sapiens, which is most likely for more efficient upright walking. This further indicates a fully terrestrial bipedalism, which is unlike older hominin species that show a combined feature of bipedalism and tree climbing. The Boy was relatively tall, which increased his body surface area that would enhance heat dissipation and prevent heat stress under the hot sun.

The overall KNM-WT 15000 skeleton still had features (such as a low sloping forehead, strong brow ridges, and the absence of a chin) not seen in H. sapiens. However, there are significant defining characters, such as bigger brain size (880 cc). The arms and legs are slightly longer indicating effective bipedality. The nose is projecting like those of humans rather than the open flat nose seen in other apes. Body hair may also have been thinner (most likely naked) and possibly with increased sweat glands to hasten cooling.

== Vocal capabilities ==
The fossil skeleton and other fossil evidence, such as Acheulean stone tools, prompt the majority of scientists to conclude that Homo erectus – unlike their more primitive ancestors – became efficient hunters. The social structure would probably have become more complex with a larger brain volume; the Broca's area of the brain allows speech and is noted by a slight slant on the cranium. Turkana Boy's thoracic vertebrae are narrower than in Homo sapiens. This would have allowed him less motor control over the thoracic muscles that are used in modern humans to modify respiration to enable the sequencing upon single exhalations of complex vocalisations.

== Disease ==
Early studies indicated that Turkana Boy suffered from a congenital disorder, either dwarfism or scoliosis. This was because the rib bones appeared asymmetrical to the spine, at the time attributed to skeletal dysplasia. However, in 2013, a study showed that when the rib bones were rearranged, they became symmetrical against the spine, and that an unusual structure of the vertebrae was characteristic of the early hominins. However, the fossil definitely showed lumbar disc herniation, an injury implicated with the specimen's death. The specimen also had a diseased mandible.

== Display ==
The fossil is held in the National Museums of Kenya and a cast is on display.

== See also ==
- List of human evolution fossils
