= Chellean Man =

Hominin fossil

Chellean man
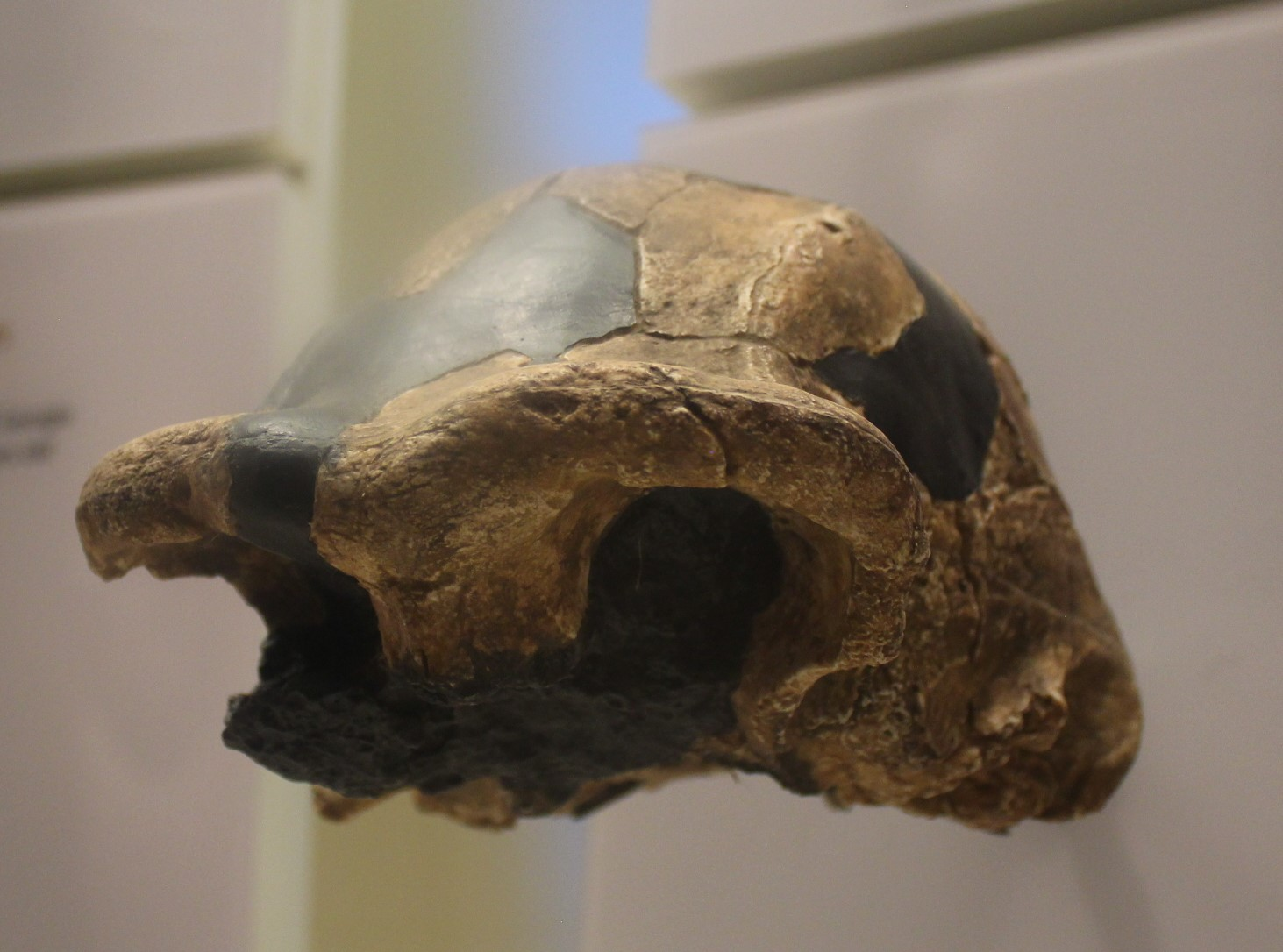
- OH 9 replica
- Catalog no.: OH 9
- Common name: Chellean man
- Species: Homo erectus/Homo erectus/Homo louisleakeyi
- Age: 1.4 million years
- Place discovered: Olduvai Gorge, Tanzania
- Date discovered: 2 December 1960
- Discovered by: Louis S. B. Leakey

Olduvai Hominid number 9 (OH 9), known as the Chellean Man, is a fossilized skull cap of an early hominin, found in LLK II, Olduvai Gorge by Louis S. B. Leakey in 1960. It is believed to be ca. 1.4 million years old. Its cranial capacity is estimated at greater than 1067 cm^{3}, the largest value among all known African Homo erectus specimens. OH 9 is significant because of the features it carried and its correlation to the species classification it resides in.

== Classification ==
Leakey named it "Chellean Man", in reference to the Oldowan tools found at the site, which were then referred to by the now-obsolete name Chellean. Heberer (1963) provisionally named a new species Homo leakeyi based on the specimen in honor of Leakey, but most subsequent workers have regarded it as Homo ergaster, or as Homo erectus (H. ergaster is sometimes regarded as a subspecies of H. erectus, H. erectus ergaster). Phillip Tobias provisionally named a new subspecies, H. erectus olduvaiensis, in 1968 based on the specimen, but this has not seen continued use. To the extent that proponents of the use of H. ergaster define ergaster as a separate species (instead of an "African H. erectus") rather than a pure chronospecies, the assignment of OH 9 to H. erectus sensu stricto by Colin Groves supports subsuming H. ergaster into H. erectus.

Because the name Homo leakeyi was proposed conditionally, it is not valid according to the rules established by the ICZN. Kretzoi (1984) created the replacement name Homo louisleakeyi, which is valid.

Cranial bone thickness has been widely qualified for Homo erectus but rarely quantified. It’s quite often that throughout craniums found, the thickness varies between those different hominids. Yet in OH 9, compared to other H. erectus, it had the biggest cranial capacity standing at 1,067 cc and one of the largest mid supra-orbital torus thickness of 18.5 mm also known as the brow ridge. OH 9 has a robust brow ridge that allows it to stand out among other H. erectus. The brow ridge made it difficult to determine whether this cranium should be classified as H. erectus or a different species. Cranial bone thickness is key when determining whether a specimen found is H. erectus. The pattern of bone thickness distribution observed in Asian H. erectus, P. paniscus, and possibly in the australopiths, early Homo or African H. ergaster/erectus analyzed appears to be a pleomorphic trait among hominids. Since cranium thickness and the OH 9 cranium capacity is larger than any found, it explored the idea of different forms of H. erectus from different areas due to migration. By the 1980s, the growing numbers of H. erectus specimens, particularly in Africa, led to the realization that Asian Homo erectus (H. erectus sensu stricto), once thought so primitive, was in fact more derived than its African counter-parts, which leads into the Out of Africa hypothesis of humans origins.

== Cranial features ==
The significant features of the OH 9 also consisted of the structure of the skull. O.H. 9 had a flatter frontal squama curving not as steep from a broader supratoral shelf. Also, OH 9 showed no sign of keeling in the midline, which was often found in H. erectus especially with a protruding brow ridge. The occipital torus thickness also known as the occipital bun which is the back of the head was also fairly thick compared to most H. erectus with a thickness of 18.5 mm. OH 9 being the largest cranium capacity, helped us learn the increase of brain growth in H. erectus. Which implied that major differences in the development of cognitive capabilities existed between H. erectus and anatomically modern humans. These new traits like the robust brow ridge and skull thickness confirmed that H. erectus in different areas kept evolving. In the same site, the oldowan tools found could be assumed to have been used by this exact H. erectus. This allowed anthropologist to understand how advanced this unique H. erectus cognitive behavior truly was.
