= Homo gautengensis =

Name proposed for an extinct species of hominin from South Africa

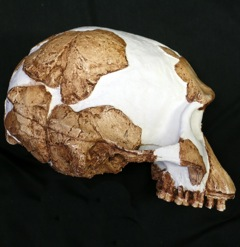
The skull Stw 53, Curnoe's designated holotype specimen for Homo gautengensis

Homo gautengensis is a species name proposed by anthropologist Darren Curnoe in 2010 for South African hominin fossils otherwise attributed to H. habilis, H. ergaster, or, in some cases, Australopithecus or Paranthropus. The fossils assigned to the species by Curnoe cover a vast temporal range, from about 1.8 million years ago to potentially as late as 0.8 million years ago, meaning that if the species is considered valid, H. gautengensis would be both one of the earliest and one of the longest lived species of Homo.

Since Curnoe's 2010 description, recognition of the species has been limited. The classification of most of the fossils referred to H. gautengensis was controversial before the description of the species and continue to be controversial to this day. Some palaeoanthropologists have gone as far as to declare that there is little reason to consider H. gautengensis a valid taxon.

== Research history ==
Hominin timeline
← / Earlier apes; ← / Gorilla split; ← / Chimpanzee split; ← / Earliest bipedal; ← / Earliest sign of Ardipithecus; ← / Earliest sign of Australopithecus; ← / Earliest stone tools; ← / Earliest sign of Homo; ← / Dispersal beyond Africa; ← / Earliest fire / cooking; ← / Earliest rock art; ← / Earliest clothes; ← / Modern humans
(million years ago)

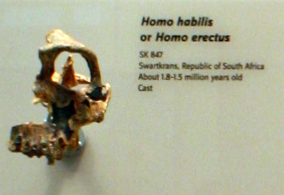
SK 847, a fragmentary skull commonly classified as Homo habilis or Homo ergaster, referred to Homo gautengensis by Curnoe

Palaeoanthropologists vary in their recognition of which hominin fossil represents the earliest record of the genus Homo (and in what range of morphology the genus should encompass). Most of the fossils contending for the position have been dated to between 2.4 and 2.1 million years ago, and their classification is highly controversial on the genus level. Along with fossils such as the mandibles AL 666 from Ethiopia and UR 501 from Malawi (both probably exceeding 2.1 million years in age), a skull designated Stw 53 was once one of the primary contenders. Today, the fossil commonly seen as the earliest fossil specimen of the Homo genus is LD 350-1, a fossil jaw excavated in 2013 in the Afar Region in Ethiopia, dated to about 2.8 million years old.

Stw 53 was discovered in August 1976 near Krugersdorp, Transvaal in South Africa and was described in 1977 by palaeoanthropologists Alun R. Hughes and Philip V. Tobias as a skull probably from an early species of Homo. Though many palaeoanthropologists recognised the fossil as representing a species of Homo, possibly H. habilis, this has never been universally accepted, many instead seeing it as a specimen of Australopithecus africanus. Though the site of the fossils was initially dated to over 2 million years old, work from 2012 suggests that the site was significantly younger, at 1.78–1.43 million years old.

In 2010, anthropologist Darren Curnoe reviewed the large amount of fossil hominin specimens from South Africa and concluded that some of the fossils were sufficiently different from the other locally recognised Homo species (H. habilis and H. ergaster/H. erectus) to represent a new species. The classification of the fossil material in South Africa, on account of much of it being fragmentary, has historically been highly contested. A few scholars believed that the region didn't preserve any species of Homo, arguing that the fossil material all belonged to australopithecines. Others believed that a single species was represented (H. ergaster) and others accepted the presence of both H. ergaster/H. erectus and H. habilis. Prior to Curnoe's description, it had already been suggested by other palaeoanthropologists, such as Frederick E. Grine and colleagues in 1993 and 1996 that Stw 53, and another skull, SK 847, represented a new species closely related to H. habilis.

Based on a number of features in the teeth and skull Curnoue concluded to be distinguishing between Stw 53 and SK 847, and the typical conditions of these features in H. habilis and H. ergaster specimens, Curnoe stated that "it is now clear that the southern African fossils are morphologically too distinct" to be accommodated within either species. As such, Curnoe erected a new species, H. gautengensis, to accommodate them. The species name gautengensis derives from the South African province Gauteng (its name in turn deriving from the Sotho-Tswana word for "place of gold"), where the fossils referred to the species had been recovered. Alongside Stw 53 (the holotype specimen) and SK 847, Curnoe assigned numerous fossil specimens to the species, designating them as paratype specimens; SE 255, SE 1508, Stw 19b/33, Stw 75–79, Stw 80, Stw 84, Stw 151, SK 15, SK 27, SK 45, SKX 257/258, SKX 267/268, SKX 339, SKX 610, SKW 3114 and DNH 70. Among the most major differences noted between Stw 53 and H. habilis by Curnoe was that some of the tooth crowns of Stw 53 were larger than the average tooth crowns of H. habilis whereas other tooth crowns were significantly more narrow.

Recognition of H. gautengensis has been limited, with the classification of the individual fossils referred to the species still being contested among palaeoanthropologists. As an example, SK 847 has in addition to H. gautengensis also been referred to Australopithecus africanus, Paranthropus robustus, H. habilis, H. ergaster, H. sp. nov or H. leakeyi (another proposed species with little recognition). Most of the H. gautengensis fossils are usually seen as representing fossil remains of H. habilis or H. ergaster, though no fossil has a single, universally agreed upon identification at the species level. In 2011, palaeoanthropologist Lee R. Berger went as far as to state that "there is little reason to consider [H. gautengensis] a valid taxon", noting that the attribution of Stw 53 itself to Homo had been challenged on both anatomical and stratigraphic grounds. Notably, Berger stated that MH1, the holotype specimen of Australopithecus sediba, is more similar to early Homo than Stw 53 is, believing the former to be the skull of a Australopithecus africanus or a Au. africanus-like relative of Au. sediba. H. gautengensis is not the only species name proposed for fossils historically considered by most to represent H. habilis specimens, while H. rudolfensis (once proposed for a group of fossils formerly considered H. habilis) is widely accepted, many other proposals, such as H. microcranous (for the fossil KNM-ER 1813) have little to no recognition today. Antón and Middleton (2023) conducted a large analysis of hominin fossils and concluded that the Stw 53 skull cannot be allocated to Homo, SK 847 is H. aff. erectus, and Stw 80 is from an indeterminate genus.

== Implications ==
The specimens referred to H. gautengensis by Curnoe cover a vast temporal range, from ~2 million years ago (or 1.78–1.43 million years according to more recent dating) to as late as 1.26–0.82 million years ago. If valid, H. gautengensis would be one of the earliest recognised species of Homo (as fossils earlier than 2 million years old have rarely been assigned at the species level) and also one of the most long-lived, spanning a period of time of over a million years.

== See also ==
- List of fossil sites
- List of human evolution fossils
