= SK 847 =

Hominin fossil

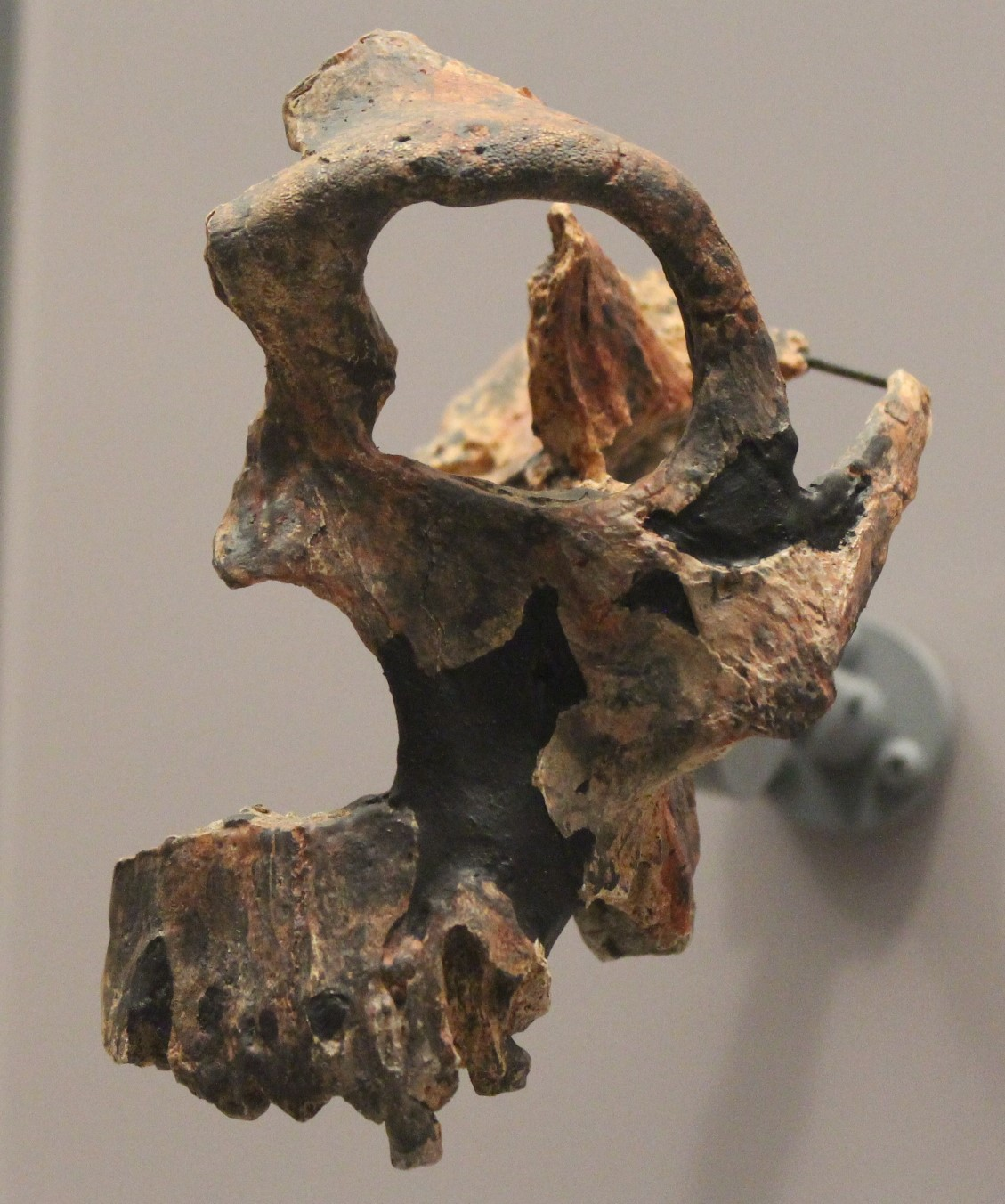
- Catalog no.: SK 847
- Species: Homo habilis
- Age: 1.8-1.5 mya
- Place discovered: Swartkrans, Republic of South Africa
- Date discovered: July 23, 1969
- Discovered by: Ronald Clarke
- Replica of SK 847 at Washington

SK 847 is the abbreviated designation for the fossilized fragments of a Homo habilis cranium, discovered in South Africa, which was dated to an age between 1.8 and 1.5 million years. This fossil shares morphological traits with the early African Homo erectus, sometimes known as Homo ergaster.

There has been much controversy over SK 847, as it is actually a composite skull reassembled from 3 separate pieces. Academics have attributed this composite skull to at least 5 different hominin taxa at one time or another.

== Discovery ==
SK 847 was discovered on July 23, 1969 in Swartkrans, Republic of South Africa by Ronald Clarke, who is also credited with the discovery of "Little Foot". It is made up of three separate pieces including facial fragments, a temporal bone, and a maxilla. The maxilla, however, was discovered previously by Robert Broom in 1948. It was not until Clarke discovered the other two fragments did they know that the three pieces belonged to the same individual and were part of the same cranium. The sex of this individual is still unknown. This discovery is significant because it is evidence for early Homo in southern Africa living at the same time or even possibly later than Homo habilis and early Homo erectus in East Africa. Also, this fossil could give evidence of the earliest uses of controlled fire.

== Taxonomy ==
Formerly SK 847 was attributed to the Australopithecus robustus group of hominid fossils, but it has been recently been attributed to the genus Homo. There has been much controversy regarding this fossil specimen because this fossil has similarities to early African Homo erectus, sometimes known as Homo ergaster. Yet, it shows other similarities to Homo habilis, also known to occur from Eastern to Southern Africa. SK 847, like another specimen StW 53, has characteristics that are not consistent with any one hominid species.

=== Evidence that suggests SK 847 belongs to the genus Homo ===
The facial features of this specimen contribute anatomical evidence that make anthropologists believe that SK 847 is not part of the australopithecine group. SK 847 has a relatively short and narrow face, pronounced brow ridge, thick supraorbital torus, a sharp sloping frontal bone, delicate curved cheekbones, a rounded forward projecting nasal bones, an obvious supratoral sulcus, and a moderate constriction of the cranium behind the eye socket. These features contrast with those of the average robust australopithecine. SK 847 also has a short palate and a small temporomandibular joint that could only fit a small, short lower jaw and not the typically massive mandible of a robust australopithecine.

=== Homo gautengensis? ===
In 2010, another argument was made by Darren Curnoe suggesting that SK 847 along with many other fossil specimens, including some from Homo habilis, Homo ergaster, and Australopithecus species, obtained from South Africa gives evidence to a whole new hominin species called Homo gautengensis, which he believes is the earliest species of the genus Homo.

=== Evidence suggesting that SK 847 is an australopithecine ===
Paleoanthropologists who rejected the classification of SK 847 as Homo referred to the single species hypothesis, which states that because of competitive exclusion, two species of hominids could not occupy the same niche. Therefore, all hominids from Swartkrans were of the same species and SK 847 is simply a small robust australopithecine. However, the single species hypothesis is no longer valid or accepted as true by anthropologists. Also, at the time of discovery, Swartkrans was known as a place with bulk of australopithecine fossils and this individual would be the only evidence of Homo found in Swartkrans.

== See also ==
- List of human evolution fossils
