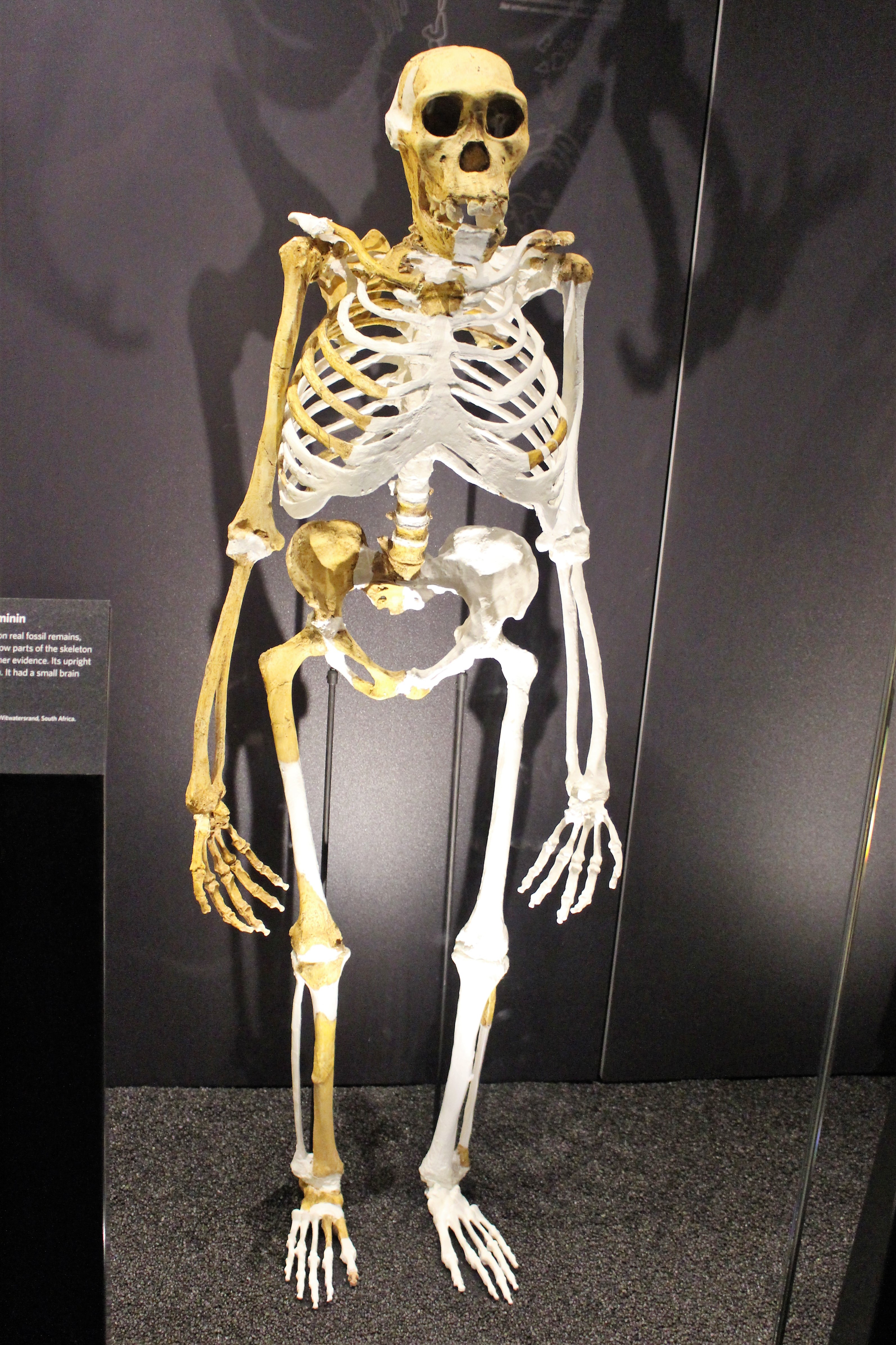
- Reconstructed skeleton of MH1 at the Natural History Museum, London

Scientific classification
- Kingdom: Animalia
- Phylum: Chordata
- Class: Mammalia
- Order: Primates
- Superfamily: Hominoidea
- Family: Hominidae
- Genus: †Australopithecus
- Species: †A. sediba

Binomial name
- †Australopithecus sediba Berger et al., 2010

= Australopithecus sediba =

Australopithecus sediba Temporal range: Early Pleistocene, 1.98 Ma

Extinct hominin from South Africa

Australopithecus sediba is an extinct species of australopithecine recovered from Malapa Cave, Cradle of Humankind, South Africa. It is known from a partial juvenile skeleton, the holotype MH1, and a partial adult female skeleton, the paratype MH2. They date to about 1.98 million years ago in the Early Pleistocene, and coexisted with Paranthropus robustus and Homo ergaster / Homo erectus. Malapa Cave may have been a natural death trap, the base of a long vertical shaft which creatures could accidentally fall into. A. sediba was initially described as being a potential human ancestor, and perhaps the progenitor of Homo, but this is contested and it could also represent a late-surviving population or sister species of A. africanus which had earlier inhabited the area.

MH1 has a brain volume of about 350–440 cc, similar to other australopithecines. The face of MH1 is strikingly similar to Homo instead of other australopithecines, with a less pronounced brow ridge, cheek bones, and prognathism (the amount the face juts out), and there is evidence of a slight chin. However, such characteristics could be due to juvenility and lost with maturity. The teeth are quite small for an australopithecine. MH1 is estimated at 130 cm (4 ft 3 in) tall, which would equate to an adult height of 150–156 cm (4 ft 11 in – 5 ft 1 in). MH1 and MH2 were estimated to have been about the same weight at 30–36 kg (66–79 lb). Like other australopithecines, A. sediba is thought to have had a narrow and apelike upper chest, but a broad and humanlike lower chest. Like other australopithecines, the arm anatomy seems to suggest a degree of climbing and arboreal behaviour. The pelvis indicates A. sediba was capable of a humanlike stride, but the foot points to a peculiar gait not demonstrated in any other hominin involving hyperpronation of the ankle, and resultantly rotating the leg inwards while pushing off. This suite of adaptations may represent a compromise between habitual bipedalism and arboreality.

A. sediba seems to have eaten only C_{3} forest plants such as some grasses and sedges, fruits, leaves, and bark. This strongly contrasts from other early hominins which ate a mix of C_{3} and abundant C_{4} savanna plants, but is similar to modern savanna chimpanzees. No other hominin bears evidence of eating bark as part of regular diet. Such a generalist diet may have allowed it to occupy a smaller home range than savanna chimps. The Malapa area may have been cooler and more humid than today, featuring closed forests surrounded by more open grasslands.

== Research history ==
=== Specimens ===
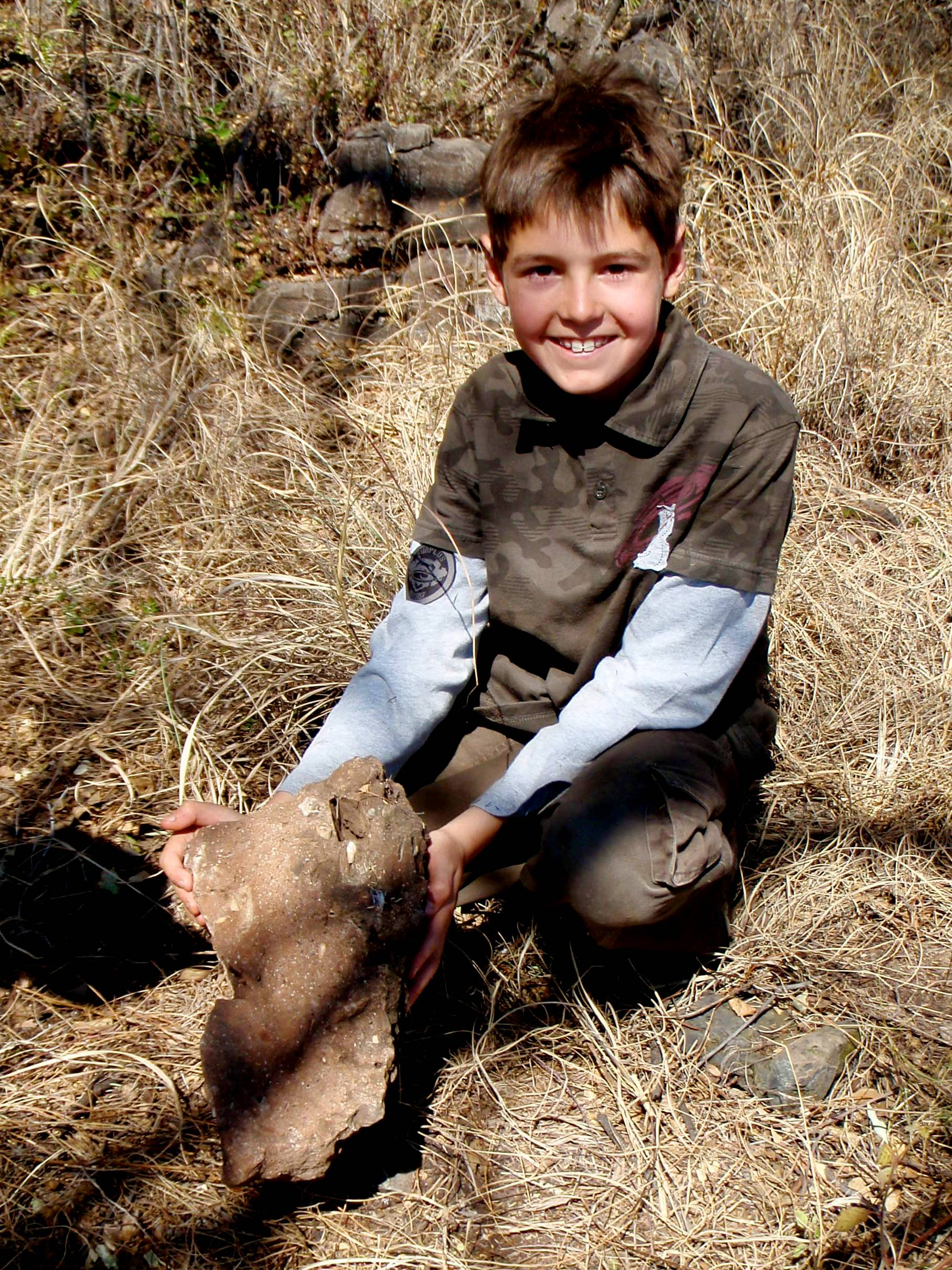
Matthew Berger displaying the fossil he found

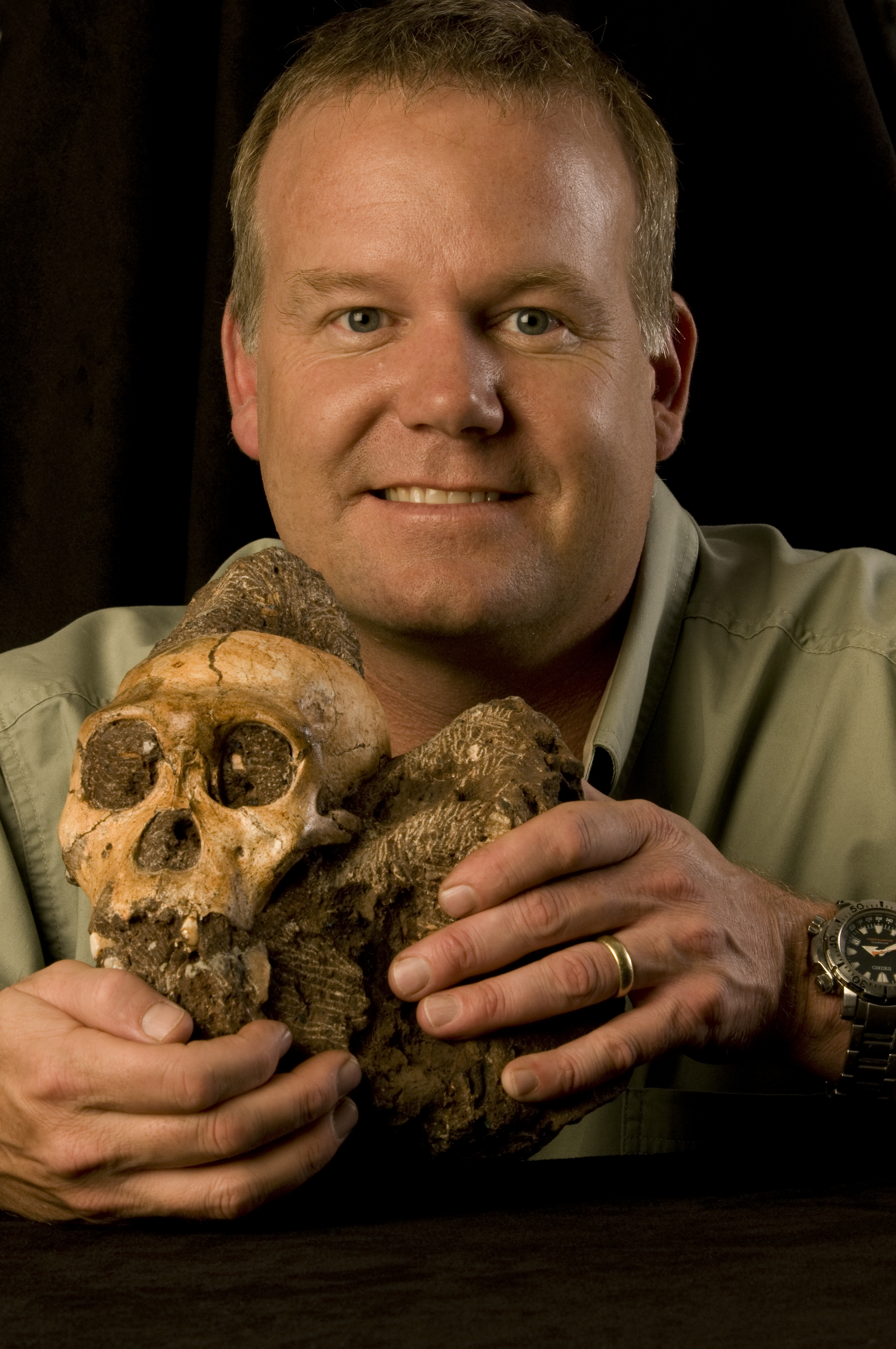
Lee Rogers Berger holding the MH1 skull

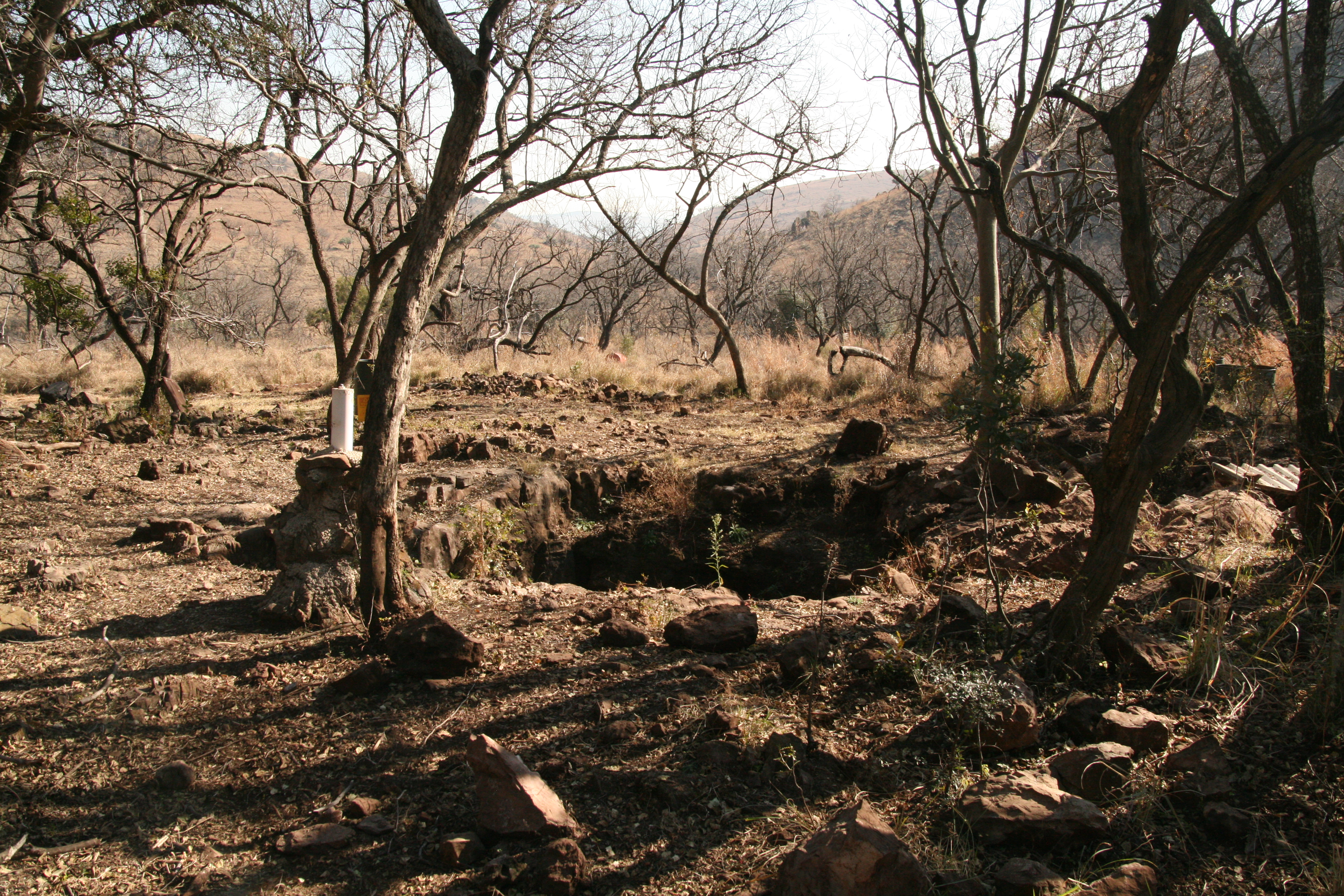
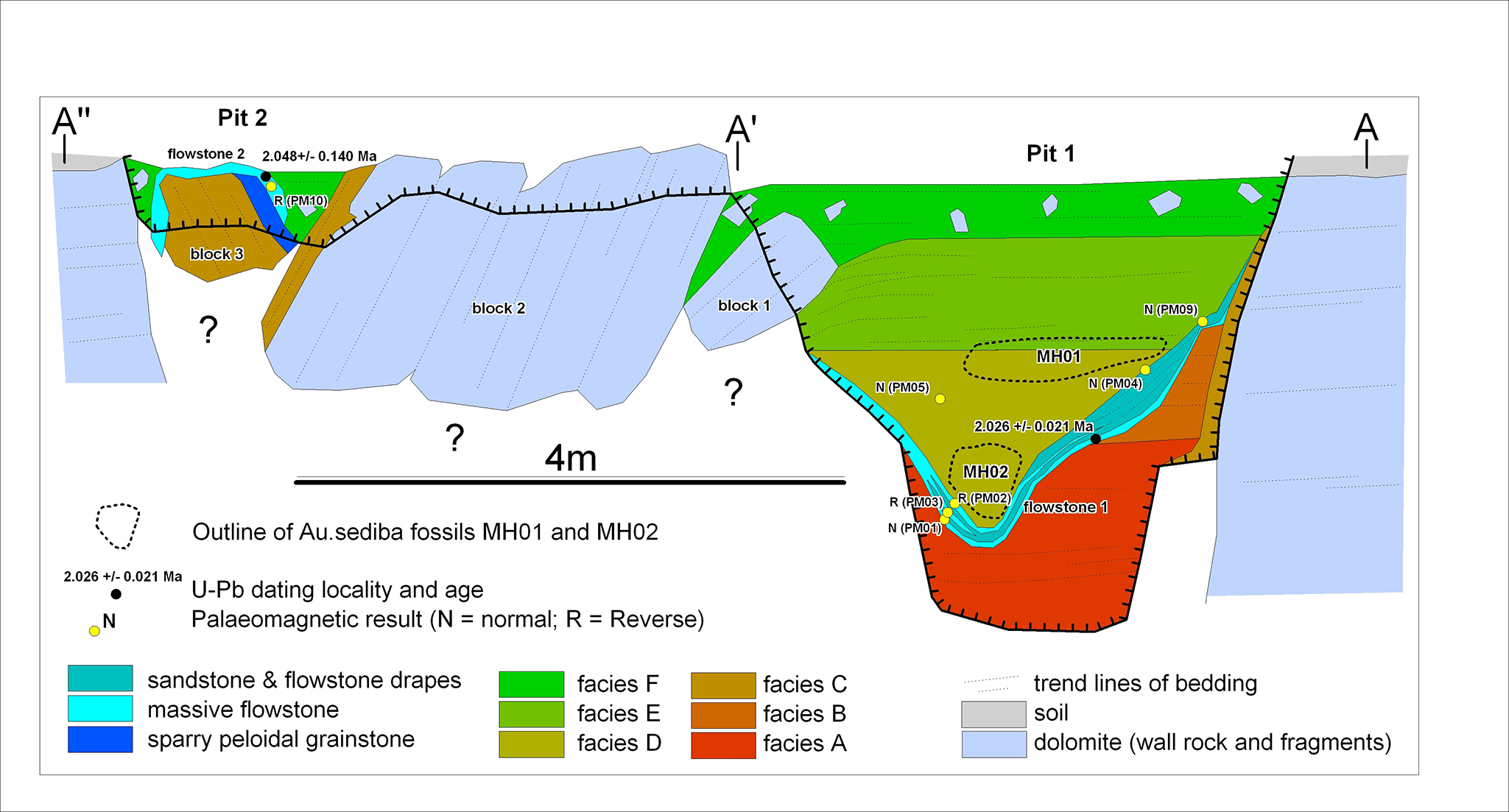
Malapa fossil site

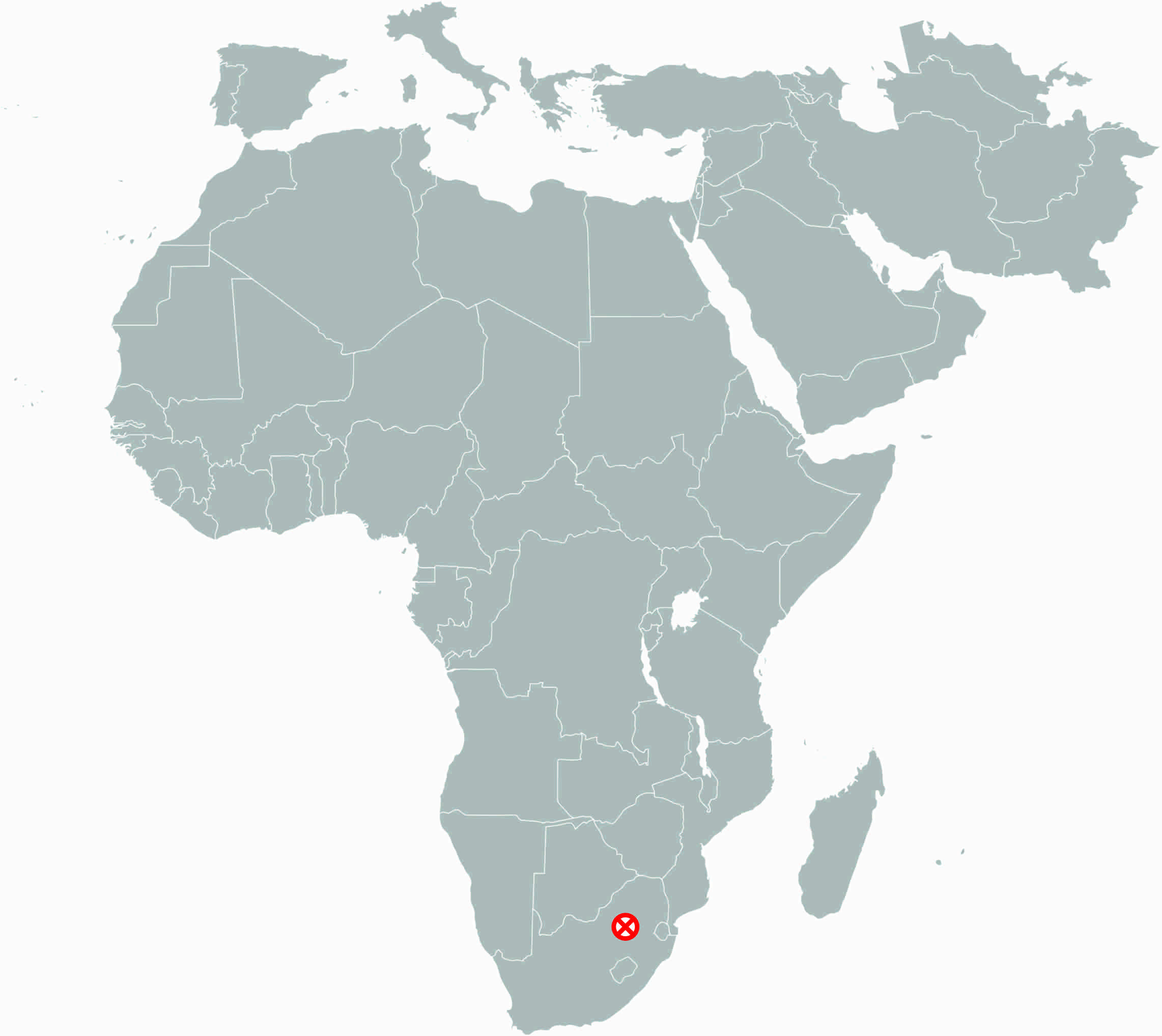
Location of the Cradle of Humankind

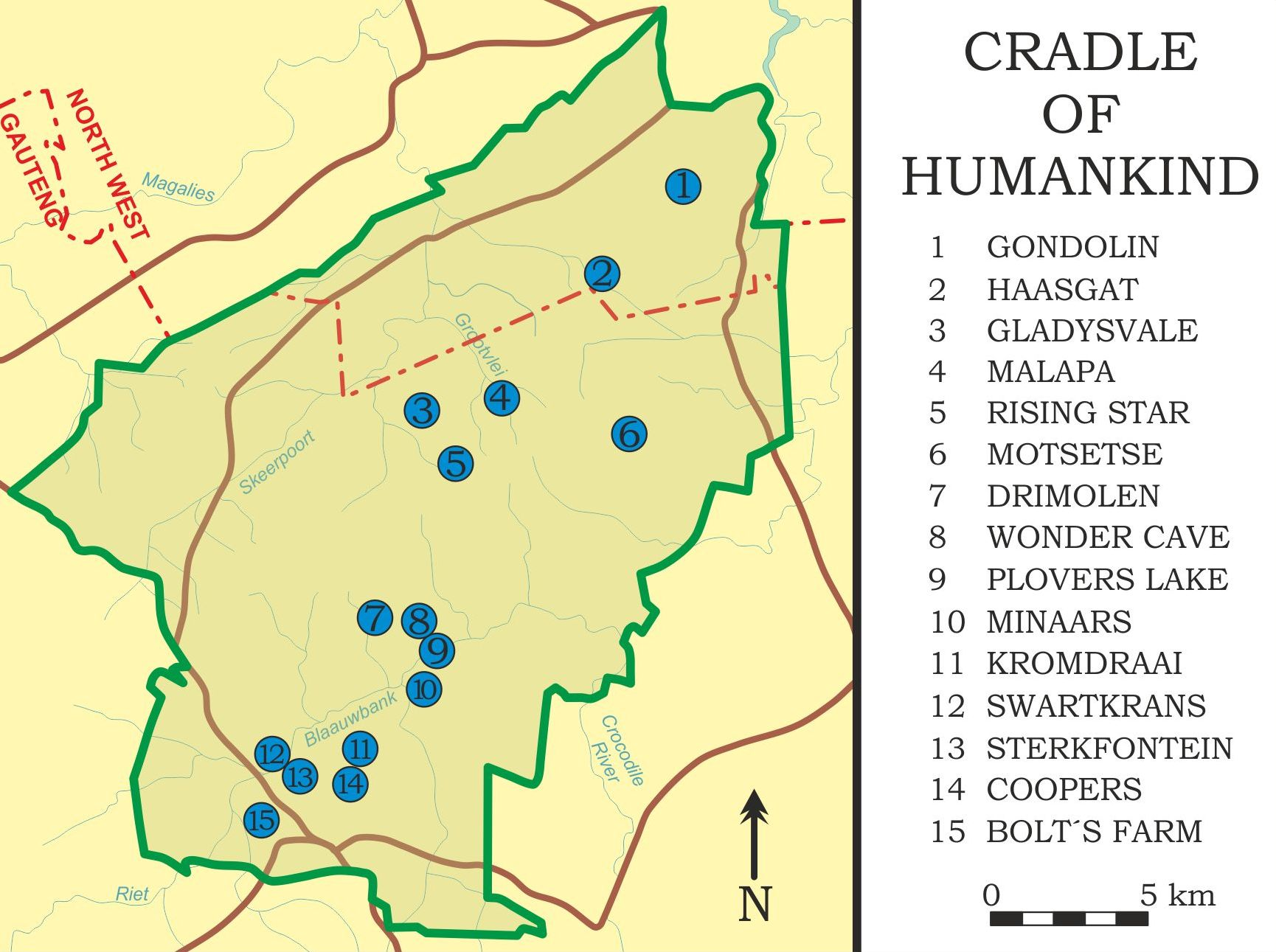
Fossil-bearing caves (Malapa is number 4)

The first fossil find was a right clavicle, MH1 (UW88-1), in Malapa Cave, Cradle of Humankind, South Africa, discovered by 9-year-old Matthew Berger on 15 August 2008 while exploring the digsite headed by his father, South African palaeoanthropologist Lee Rogers Berger. Further excavation yielded a partial skeleton for MH1, additionally including a partial skull and jawbone fragments, as well as aspects of the arms, fingers, shoulders, ribcage, spine, pelvis, legs, and feet. MH1 is interpreted as having been a juvenile male due to the apparently pronounced development of the brow ridge and canine roots, eversion of the angle of the mandible, and large scarring on the bones. However, anthropologists William Kimbel and Yoel Rak contend that these are unreliable methods of determining sex, and suggest that MH1 is female based on the lack of anterior pillars (columns running down alongside the nasal opening down to around the mouth) and a slightly convex subnasal plate, using methods of sex determination for A. africanus. MH1 was nicknamed "Karabo", which means "answer" in Tswana, by 17-year-old Omphemetse Keepile from St Mary's School, Johannesburg, in a naming contest. She chose this name because, "The fossil represents a solution towards understanding the origins of humankind."

Another partial skeleton, the adult MH2, was recovered by Lee on 4 September 2008 with isolated upper teeth, a partial jawbone, a nearly complete right arm, the right scapula, and fragments of the shoulders, right arm, spine, ribs, pelvis, knee joint, and feet. The pubic bone is broad and square, and the muscle scarring on the body is weak to moderate, which suggest that MH2 is female.

The presence of species which evolved after 2.36 million years ago and became extinct around 1.5 million years ago indicates the A. sediba layer dates to sometime within this interval during the Early Pleistocene. Uranium–lead dating of a flowstone capping the layer yielded a date of 2.026±0.021 million years ago. Using archaeomagnetic dating, the sediments have a normal magnetic polarity (as opposed to the reverse of the magnetic polarity in modern day) and the only time when this occurred during this interval is between 1.95 and 1.78 million years ago. In 2011, the flowstone was more firmly dated to 1.977±0.002 million years ago again using uranium–lead dating.

Hominin timeline
← / Earlier apes; ← / Gorilla split; ← / Chimpanzee split; ← / Earliest bipedal; ← / Earliest sign of Ardipithecus; ← / Earliest sign of Australopithecus; ← / Earliest stone tools; ← / Earliest sign of Homo; ← / Dispersal beyond Africa; ← / Earliest fire / cooking; ← / Earliest rock art; ← / Earliest clothes; ← / Modern humans
(million years ago)

=== Taphonomy ===
The cave networks around Malapa comprise long, interconnected cave openings within a 500 m × 100 m (1,640 ft × 330 ft) area. The Malapa site may have been at the base of an at most 30-metre-deep (98 ft) cavern system. The cave is at the intersection of a north-northeast and north-northwest chert-filled fracture, and the hominin remains were unearthed in a 3.3 m × 4.4 m × 3.5 m (11 ft × 14 ft × 11 ft) section on the north-northwest fracture. The layer was exposed by limestone mining in the early 20th century. The cave comprises five sedimentary facies A–E of water-laid sandstone, with A. sediba being recovered from facies D, and more hominin remains from facies E. MH1 and MH2 are separated vertically by at most 40 cm (16 in). Facies D is a 1.5-metre-thick (4.9 ft), lightly coloured layer overlying flowstone. Small peloids are common, but are fused into large and irregular groups, which indicate they were deposited in a water-logged setting. Peloids may represent faecal matter or soil microbes. The preservation state of MH1 and MH2 indicate they were deposited quickly, were moved very little, and were cemented soon after deposition in a phreatic environment (in a subterranean stream). There is no evidence of scavenging, indicating the area was inaccessible to carnivores.

This could all indicate that Malapa Cave was a deathtrap, with inconspicuous cave openings at the surface. Animals may have been lured by the scent of water emanating from the shaft, and carnivores to the scent of dead animals, and then fallen to their deaths. A large debris flow caused the remains to be deposited deeper into the cave along a subterranean stream, perhaps due to a heavy rainstorm. The chamber eventually collapsed and filled with mud.

=== Classification ===
In 2010, Lee and colleagues officially described the species Australopithecus sediba with MH1 as the holotype and MH2 the paratype. The species name "sediba" means "fountain" or "wellspring" in the local Sesotho language. Because A. sediba had many traits in common with Homo ergaster/H. erectus, particularly in the pelvis and legs, the describers postulated that A. sediba was a transitional fossil between Australopithecus and Homo. Dental traits are also suggestive of some close relationship between A. sediba and the ancestor of Homo. However, the specimens were found in a stratigraphic unit dating to 1.95–1.78 million years ago, whereas the earliest Homo fossils at the time dated to 2.33 million years ago (H. habilis from Hadar, Ethiopia). Currently, the oldest Homo specimen is LD 350-1 dating to 2.8–2.75 million years ago from Ledi-Geraru, Ethiopia. To reconcile the dating discrepancy, the describers also hypothesised that A. sediba evolved from a population of A. africanus (which inhabited the same general region) some time before the Malapa hominins, and that Homo split from A. sediba sometime thereafter. This would imply an 800,000 year ghost lineage between A. africanus and the Malapa hominins. It was also suggested that A. sediba, instead of H. habilis or H. rudolfensis, was the direct ancestor of H. ergaster/H. erectus (the earliest uncontested member of the genus Homo), primarily because the Malapa hominins were dated to 1.98 million years ago in 2011, which at the time predated the earliest representative of H. ergaster/H. erectus. A. sediba is now thought to have been contemporaneous with H. ergaster/H. erectus and Paranthropus robustus in the Cradle of Humankind.

Alternatively, A. sediba could also represent a late-surviving morph or sister species of A. africanus unrelated to Homo, which would mean Homo-like traits evolved independently in A. sediba and Homo (homoplasy). The fossil record of early Homo is poorly known and based largely on fragmentary remains, making convincing anatomical comparisons difficult and sometimes unfeasible. A. africanus, A. afarensis, and A. garhi have also been proposed as the true ancestor of Homo, and the matter is much debated. Further, the holotype is a juvenile, which Kimbel and Rak cite in arguing that some of the Homo-like facial characteristics may have been lost with maturity. Phylogenetic analyses in 2023 based on craniodental morphology recovered A. sediba in an unstable, varied position among hominins, so the researchers concluded that adult skeletons of this species are required for appropriate classification.

The present classification of australopithecines is in disarray. Australopithecus may be considered a grade taxon whose members are united by their similar physiology rather than close relations with each other over other hominin genera, and, for the most part, it is largely unclear how any species relates to the others.

African Hominin timeline

== Anatomy ==
=== Skull ===
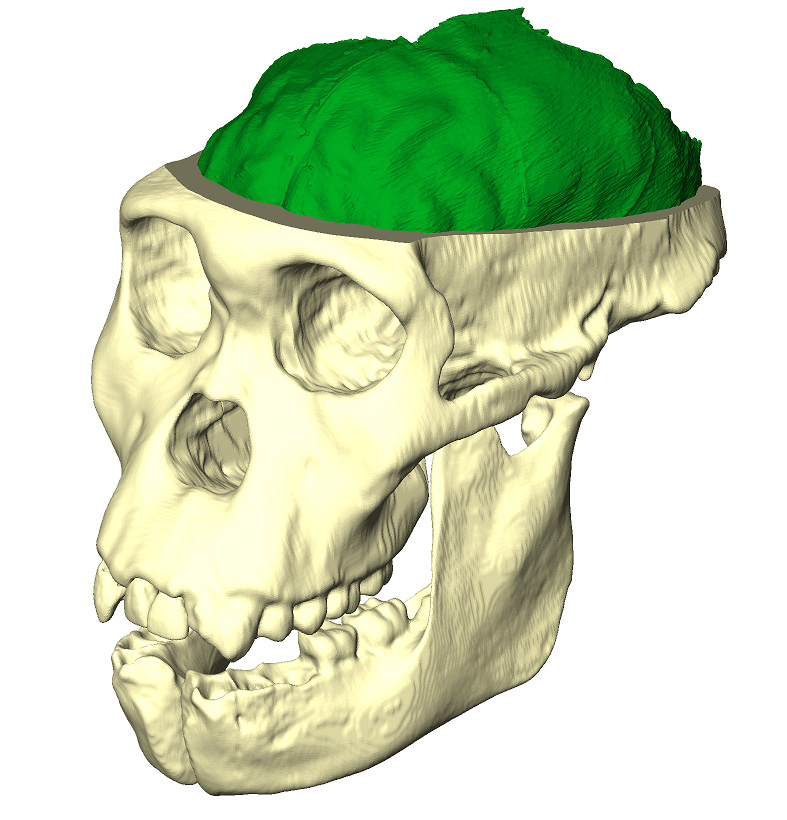
Endocast of MH1

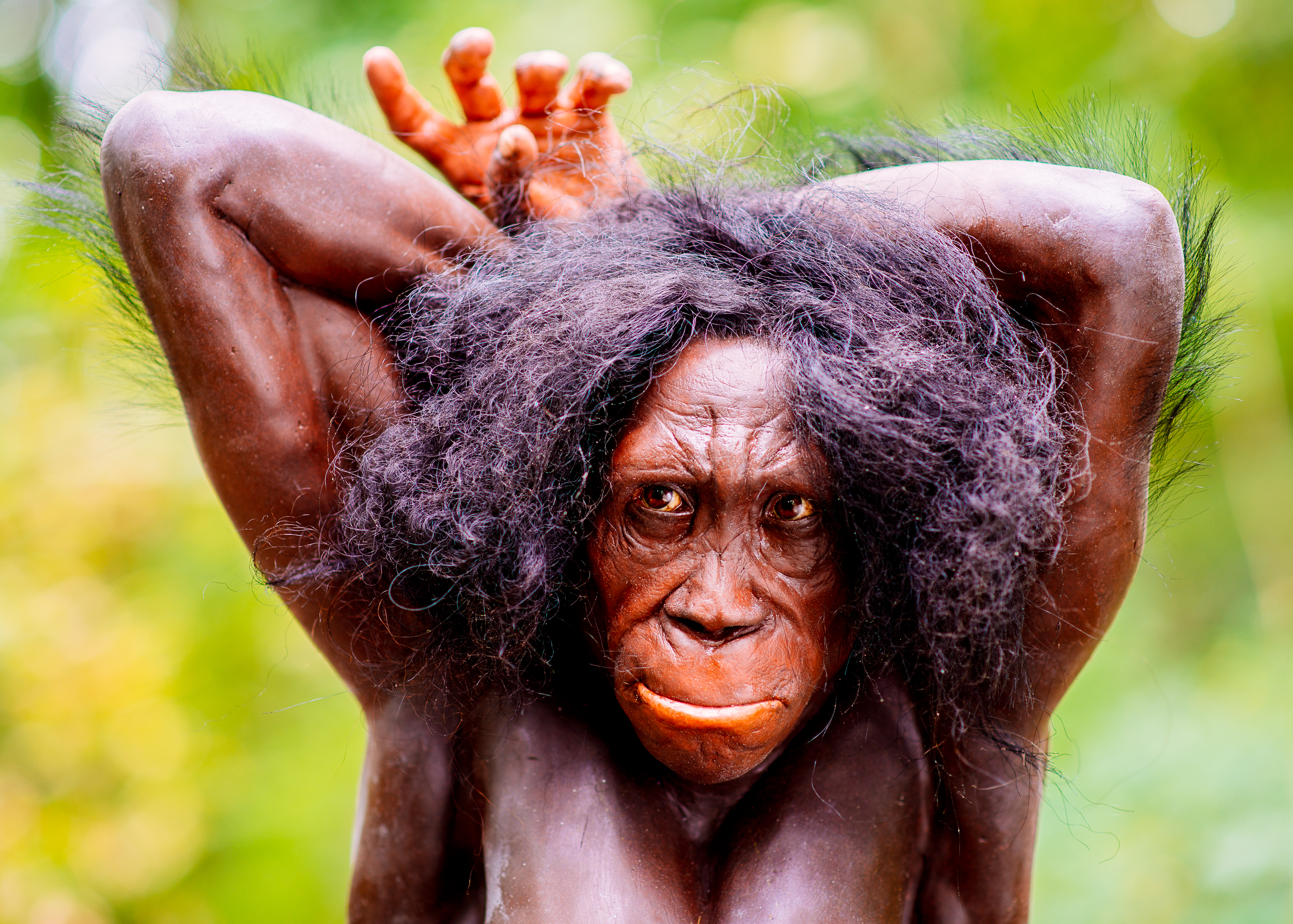
Reconstruction of a largely hairless male A. sediba by Adrie and Alfons Kennis at the Neanderthal Museum, Germany

Only the cranial vault of MH1 was preserved, which has a volume of 363 cc. The very back of the brain is estimated to have been 7–10 cc. To estimate the cerebellum, the australopithecines KNM-ER 23000 (Paranthropus boisei) and Sts 19 (A. africanus) with volumes of 40–50 cc, as well as KNM-ER 1813 (H. habilis), KNM-ER 1805 (H. habilis), and KNM-ER 1470 (H. rudolfensis) with volumes of 55–75 cc were used to estimate the volume of the MH1 cerebellum as about 50 cc. Considering all these, MH1 may have had a brain volume of about 420–440 cc. This is typical for australopithecines. Using trends seen in modern primates between adult and neonate brain size, neonate brain size may have been 153–201 cc, similar to what is presumed for other australopithecines. Brain configuration appears to have been mostly australopithecine-like, but the orbitofrontal cortex appears to have been more humanlike.

Overall, A. sediba skull anatomy is most similar to A. africanus. However, MH1 has a smaller cranium, a transversely wider cranial vault, more vertically-inclined walls of the parietal bone, and more widely spaced temporal lines. Much like Homo, the brow ridge is less pronounced, the cheekbones are less flared, the face does not jut out as far (less prognathism), and there is a slight chin. However, such characteristics are also found in some A. africanus skulls from Sterkfontein Member 4, which Kimbel and Rak believed could indicate that these Homo-like attributes would have been lost in maturity. Also, if prognathism is measured using the anterior nasal spine instead of the very base of the nose, prognathism in MH1 falls within the range of that seen in A. africanus. The teeth are quite small for an australopithecine, and are more within the range of those of early Homo. However, unlike Homo, the molars progressively increase in size towards the back of the mouth—as opposed to the second molar being the largest—and the cusps are more closely spaced together.

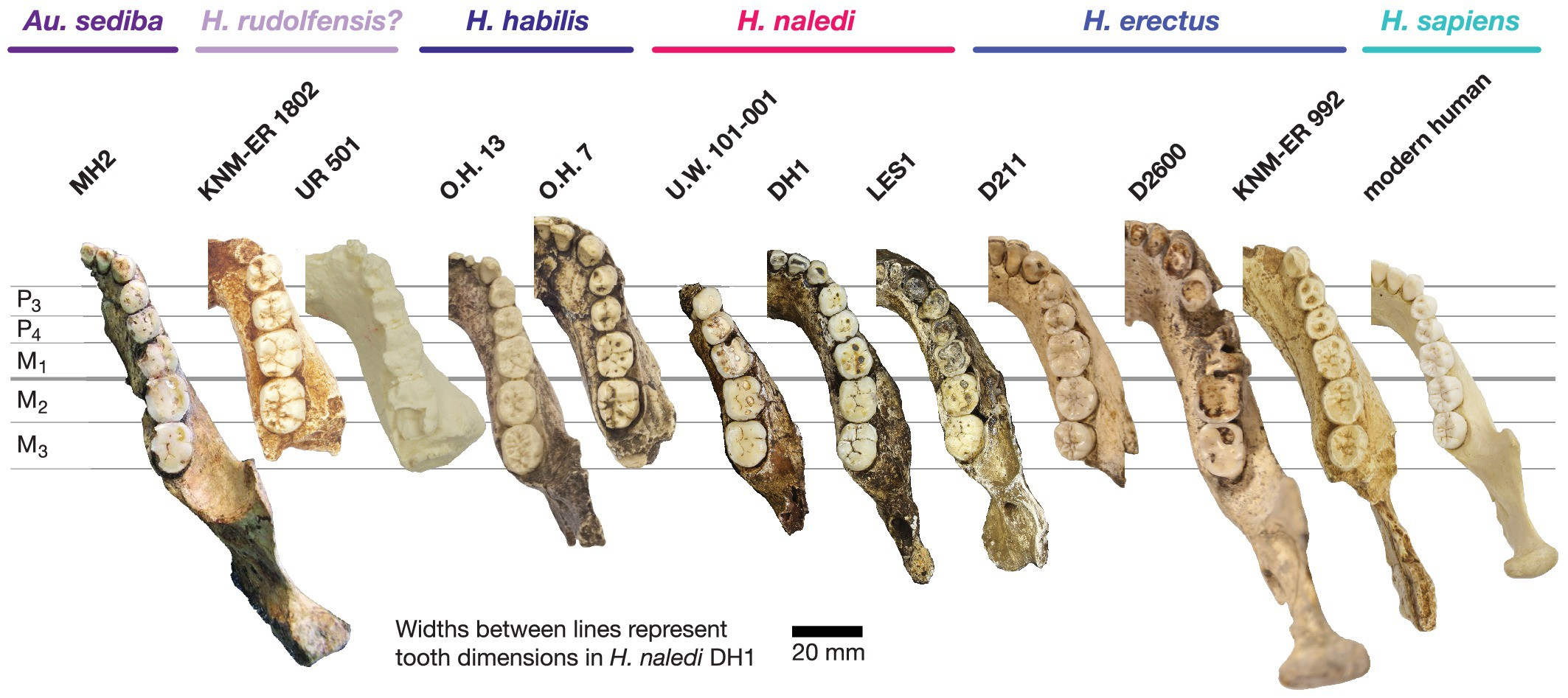
Comparison of various hominins' jawbones (A. sediba leftmost)

The shape of the mandibular ramus (the bar which connects the jaw to the skull) is quite different between MH1 and MH2. That of MH1 is taller and wider; the front and back border are nearly vertical and parallel, in contrast to the nonparallel borders of MH2 with a concave front border; and the coronoid process of MH1 is angled towards the back with a deep and asymmetrical mandibular notch, whereas MH2 has an uncurved coronoid process with a shallow mandibular notch. Compared to patterns seen in modern great apes, such marked differences exceed what would be expected if these could be explained as due to sexual dimorphism or the juvenile status of MH1. Skeletally, A. sediba may have been a highly variable species.

=== Torso ===
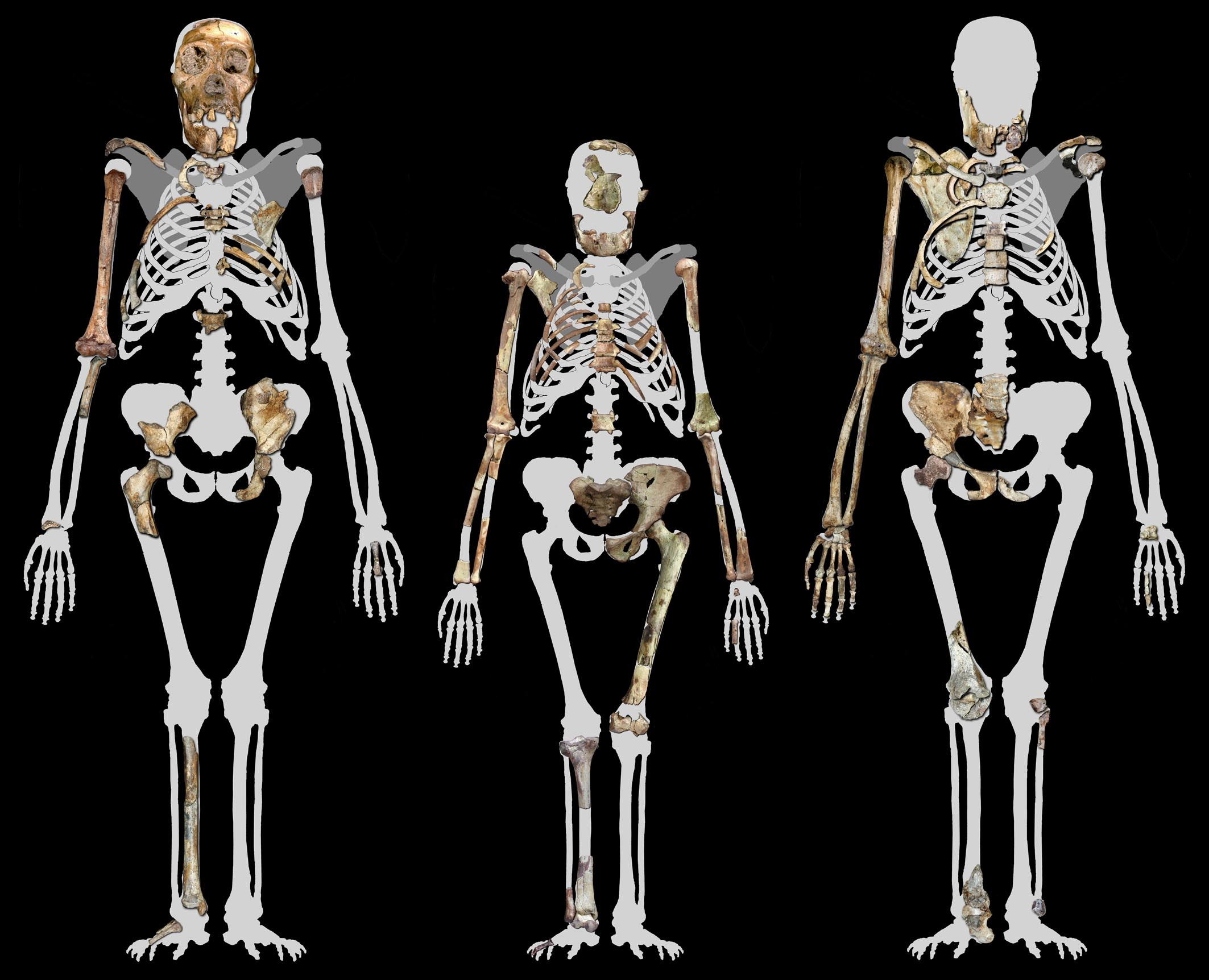
MH1 (left), A. afarensis Lucy (centre), and MH2 (right) MH1 is 130 cm (4 ft 3 in) tall

MH1 and MH2 were estimated to have been roughly the same size, about 30–36 kg (66–79 lb). This is smaller than many contemporary hominins, but reasonable for an australopithecine. MH1 was about 130 cm (4 ft 3 in) tall, but he was a juvenile at about the same skeletal development of a 12-year-old human child or a 9-year-old chimpanzee. A. sediba, much like earlier and contemporary hominins, appears to have had an ape-like growth rate based on dental development rate, so MH1 may have reached about 85% of its adult size assuming a chimpanzeelike growth trajectory, or 80% assuming a humanlike trajectory. This would equate to roughly 150 or 156 cm (4 ft 11 in or 5 ft 1 in).

MH1 preserves 4 neck, 6 thoracic, and 2 lumbar vertebrae; and MH2 preserves 2 neck, 7 thoracic, 2 lumbar, and 1 sacral vertebrae. The lordosis (humanlike curvature) and joints of the neck vertebrae, indicating similar head posture to humans. However, the overall anatomy of the neck vertebrae is apelike, and point to a much stiffer neck. A. sediba lacks a humanlike brachial plexus (which is identified in some A. afarensis), and the human brachial plexus is responsible for nerves and muscle innervation in the arms and hands enhancing motor control. Like humans, A. sediba appears to have had a flexible lumbar series comprising 5 vertebrae—as opposed to 6 static vertebrae in non-human apes—and exhibiting lumbar lordosis (human curvature of the spine) consistent with habitual upright posture. However, A. sediba seems to have had a highly mobile lower back and exaggerated lumbar lordosis, which may have been involved in counteracting torques directed inwards while walking in the hyperpronating gait proposed for A. sediba. MH1 preserves 2 upper thoracic, 1 mid-thoracic, and 3 lower thoracic ribs; and MH2 4 consecutive upper-to-mid-thoracic, and 3 lower thoracic ribs joined with the vertebrae. This indicates that A. sediba had an apelike constricted upper chest, but the humanlike anatomy of the pelvis may suggest A. sediba had a broad and humanlike lower chest. The narrow upper chest would have hindered arm swinging while walking, and would have restricted the rib cage and prevented heavy breathing and thereby fast walking or long-distance running. In contrast, A. sediba seems to have had a humanlike narrow waist, repositioned abdominal external oblique muscles, and wider iliocostalis muscles on the back, which all would improve walking efficiency by counteracting sideward flexion of the torso.

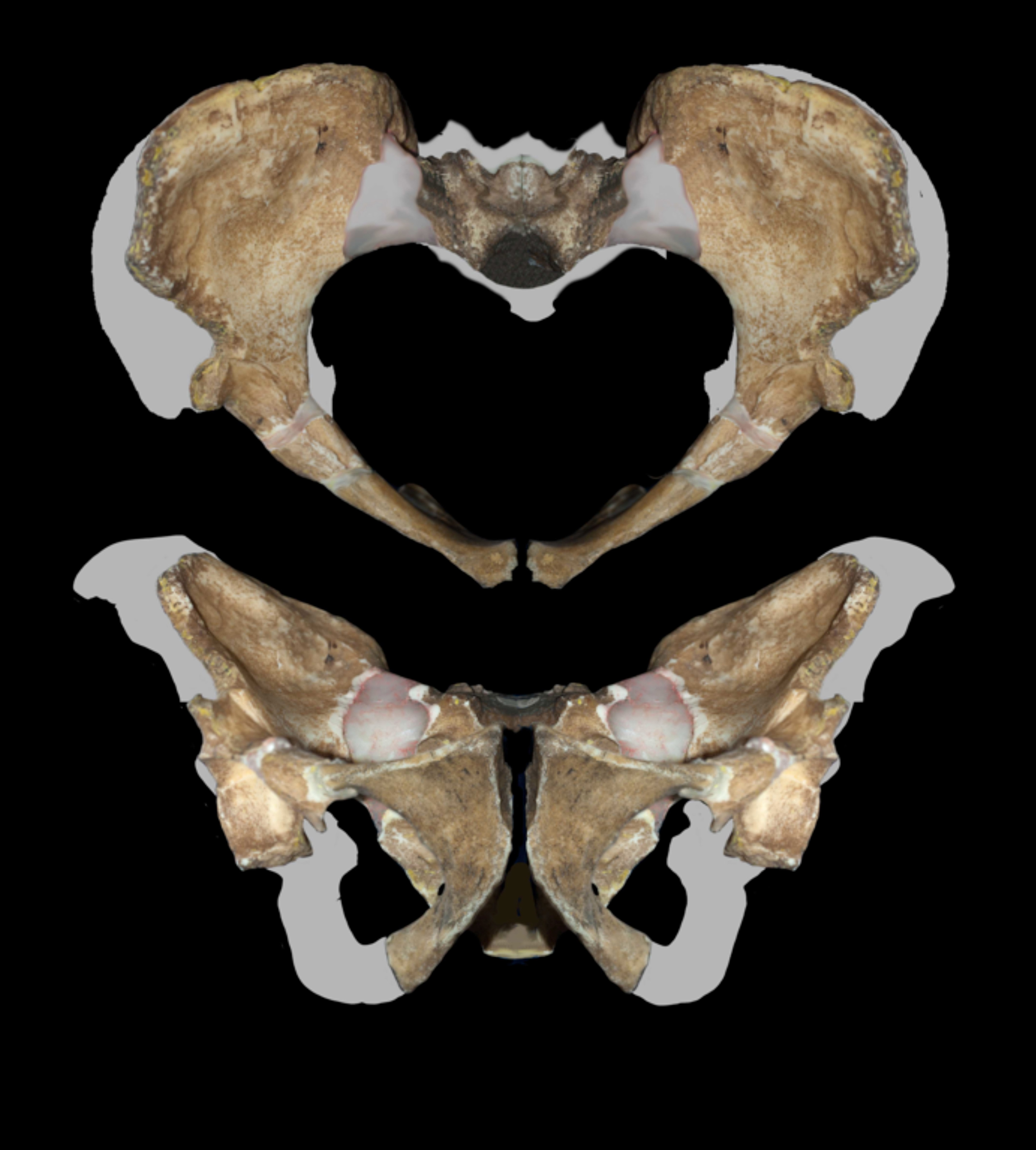
Reconstructed MH2 pelvis

The pelvis shares several traits with early Homo and H. ergaster, as well as KNM-ER 3228 from Koobi Fora, Kenya, and OH 28 from Olduvai Gorge, Tanzania, which are unassigned to a species (though generally are classified as Homo spp.) There was more buttressing along the acetabulum and sacrum improving hip extension, enlargement of the iliofemoral ligament attachment shifting the weight behind the centre of rotation of the hip, more buttressing along the acetabulum and iliac blade improving alternating pelvic tilt, and more distance between the acetabulum and the ischial tuberosity reducing moment arm at the hamstrings. This may have allowed a humanlike stride in A. sediba. The hip joint appears to have had a more humanlike pattern of load bearing than the H. habilis specimen OH 62. The birth canal of A. sediba appears to be more gynaecoid (the normal human condition) than those of other australopiths which are more platypelloid, though A. sediba is not completely gynaecoid which may be due to smaller neonate brain (and thus head) size. Like humans, the birth canal had increased diameter sagittally (from front to back) and the pubis bone curled upwards.

=== Upper limbs ===
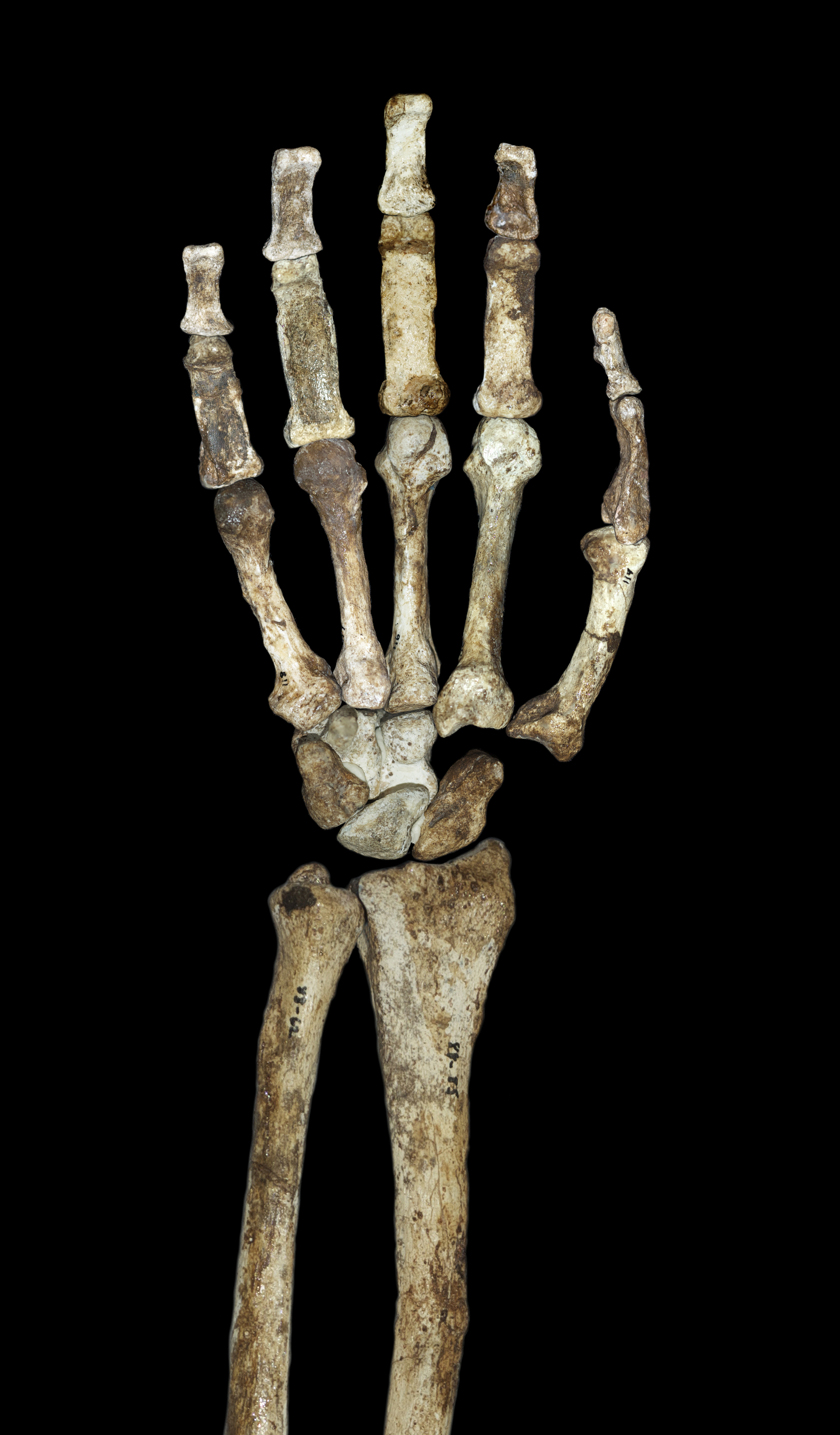
Palmar view of the hand and forearm of MH2

Like other australopithecines and early Homo, A. sediba had somewhat apelike upper body proportions with relatively long arms, a high brachial index (forearm to humerus ratio) of 84, and large joint surfaces. It is debated if apelike upper limb configuration of australopithecines is indicative of arboreal behaviour or simply is a basal trait inherited from the great ape last common ancestor in the absence of major selective pressures to adopt a more humanlike arm anatomy. The shoulders are in a shrugging position, the shoulder blade has a well developed axillary border, and the conoid tubercle (important in muscle attachment around the shoulder joint) is well defined. Muscle scarring patterns on the clavicle indicate a humanlike range of motion. The shoulder blade is most similar to that of orangutans in terms of the size of the glenoid cavity (which forms the shoulder joint) and its angle with the spine, though the shape of the shoulder blade is most similar to humans and chimpanzees. The humerus has a low degree of torsion unlike humans and African apes, which (along with the short clavicle) suggests the shoulder blade was placed farther from the midline like in Homo, though it is positioned higher up the back like in other australopithecines. The apelike qualities of the arms are apparently more marked in A. sediba than the more ancient A. afarensis, and if A. afarensis is ancestral to A. sediba, this could indicate an adaptive shift towards arboreal behaviour.

At the elbow joint, the lateral and medial epicondyles of the humerus are elongated, much like other australopithecines and non-human African apes. The humerus also sports a developed crest at the elbow joint to support the brachioradialis muscle which flexes the forearm. Like non-human African apes, there is a strong attachment for the biceps on the radius and for the triceps on the ulna. However, there is less mechanical advantage for the biceps and brachialis. The ulna also supports strong attachment for the flexor carpi ulnaris muscle. The olecranon fossa is large and deep and there is a prominent trochlear keel, which are important in maintaining stability in the arms while they are extended. The finger bones are long, robust, and curved, and support strong flexor digitorum superficialis muscles important for flexing the fingers. These are sometimes argued as evidence of arboreal behaviour in australopithecines. The hand also features a relatively long thumb and short fingers, much like Homo, which could suggest a precision grip important in creating and using complex stone tools.

=== Lower limbs ===
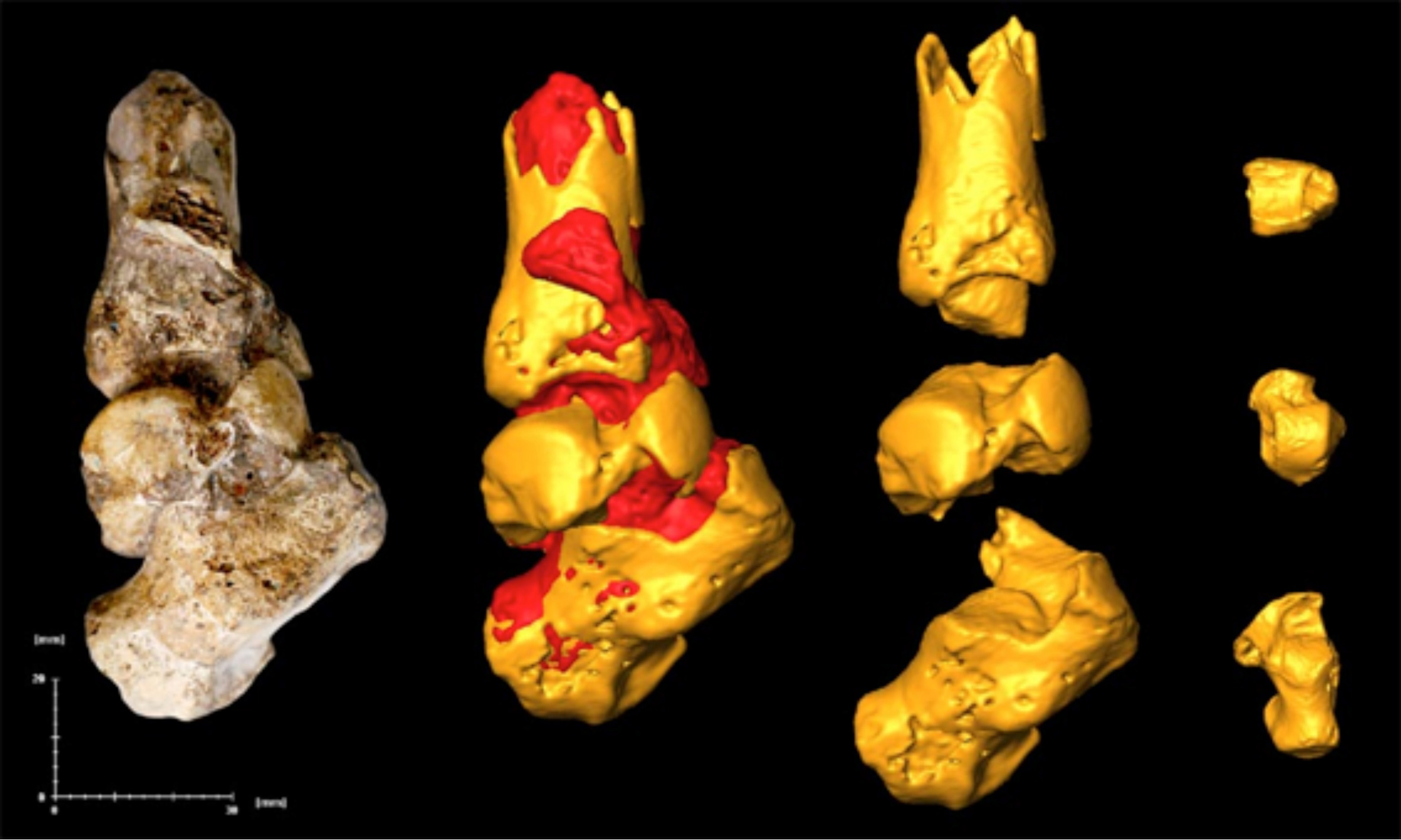
A. sediba ankle (matrix adhering to the bone in red)

Like other australopithecines, the ankle, knee, and hip joints indicate habitual bipedalism. The leg bones are quite similar to those of A. afarensis. The ankle is mostly humanlike with perhaps a humanlike Achilles tendon.

The talus bone is stout and more like those of non-human apes, and features a medially twisted neck and a low neck torsion angle. It is debated if A. sediba had a humanlike foot arch or if the foot was more apelike. The heel bone is angled at a 45-degree angle, and is markedly angled from the front to the back, most strongly at the peroneal trochlea. The robust peroneal trochlea indicates strong peroneus muscles which extend through the calf to the ankle. The foot lacks the lateral plantar tubercle (which may be involved in dissipate forces when the heel hits the ground in a normal human gait) seen in humans and A. afarensis. The gracile body of the heel bone and the robust malleolus (the bony prominence on each side of the ankle) are quite apelike, with less efficient force transfer between the heel bone and the talus, and apelike mobility at the midfoot. A. sediba is most similar to the condition seen in gorillas, and the foot may have been functionally equivalent to that of A. africanus.

== Palaeobiology ==
=== Diet ===
Analysis of phytoliths (microscopic plant remains) from the dental plaque of both specimens and carbon isotope analysis shows a diet of almost exclusively C_{3} forest plants despite a presumably wide availability of C_{4} plants in their mixed savanna environment. Such a feeding pattern is also observed in modern savanna chimps and is hypothesised for the Early Pliocene Ardipithecus ramidus, but is quite different from any other early hominin. A total of 38 phytoliths were recovered from two teeth from MH1, of which 15 are consistent with dicots, 9 monocots, and the other 14 indeterminate. The monocots were probably sourced from C_{3} grasses and sedges growing in well-watered and shady areas, and other phytoliths were sourced from fruit, leaves, and wood or bark. Though bark is commonly eaten by other primates for its high protein and sugar content, and bark bread has historically been recorded as a famine food, no other hominin is known to have consumed bark regularly. Dental microwearing analysis similarly suggests the two Malapa hominins ate hard foods, complexity values ranging between H. erectus and the robust P. robustus. Nonetheless, the jaw does not appear to have been as well adapted for producing high strains compared to other early hominins, which may indicate A. sediba was not as highly dependent on its ability to process mechanically challenging food.

The interpretation of A. sediba as a generalist herbivore of C_{3} forest plants is consistent with it being at least partially arboreal. Such a broad diet may have allowed A. sediba to have occupied much smaller home ranges than modern savanna chimps which predominantly consume only fruit, as A. sediba was able to fall back on bark and other fracture-resistant foods.

=== Gait ===
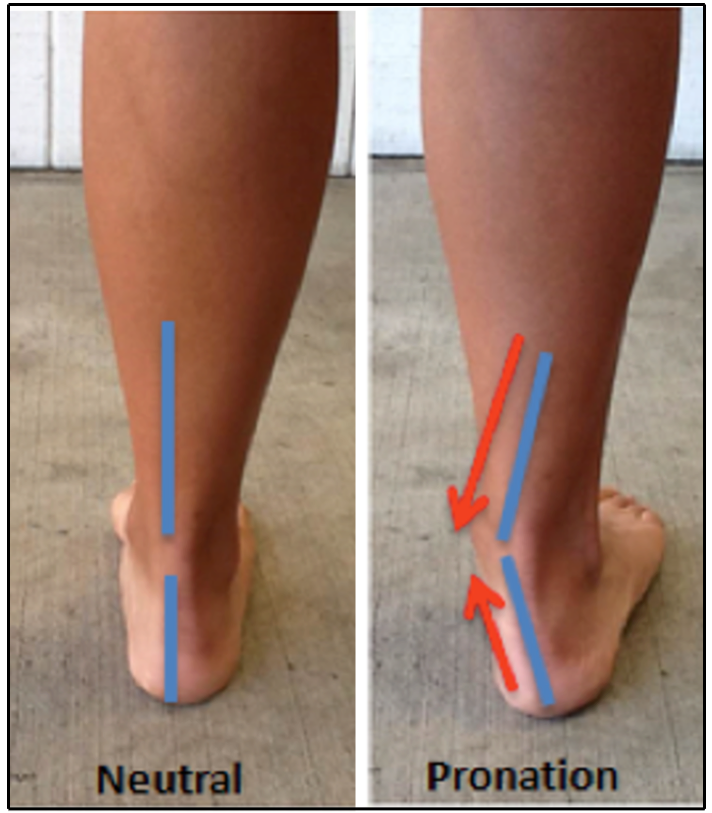
Ankle positions in a human right foot (hyperpronation on the right)

While walking, A. sediba may have displayed hyperpronation of the ankle joint causing exaggerated transfer of weight inwards during stance phase. For modern human hyperpronators, the foot is highly inverted during the swing phase, and contact with the ground is first made by the outer border of the foot, causing high torques rotating the entire leg inwards. Similarly, the attachments for the rectus femoris and biceps femoralis muscles in A. sediba are consistent with midline-directed strains across the legs, hips, and knees. This mode of walking is unideal for modern human anatomy, and hyperpronators are at a higher risk of developing plantar fasciitis, shin splints, and tibial stress fractures. To counteract this, A. sediba may have made use of a mobile midfoot as opposed to a stiff humanlike midfoot, which may have prevented overly stressful loading of the ankle.

The hyperpronating gait and related suite of adaptations have not been identified in other hominins, and it is unclear why A. sediba would develop this. A mobile midfoot would also be beneficial in extensive climbing behaviour, so hyperpronation may have been a compromise between habitual bipedalism and arboreality.

=== Birth ===
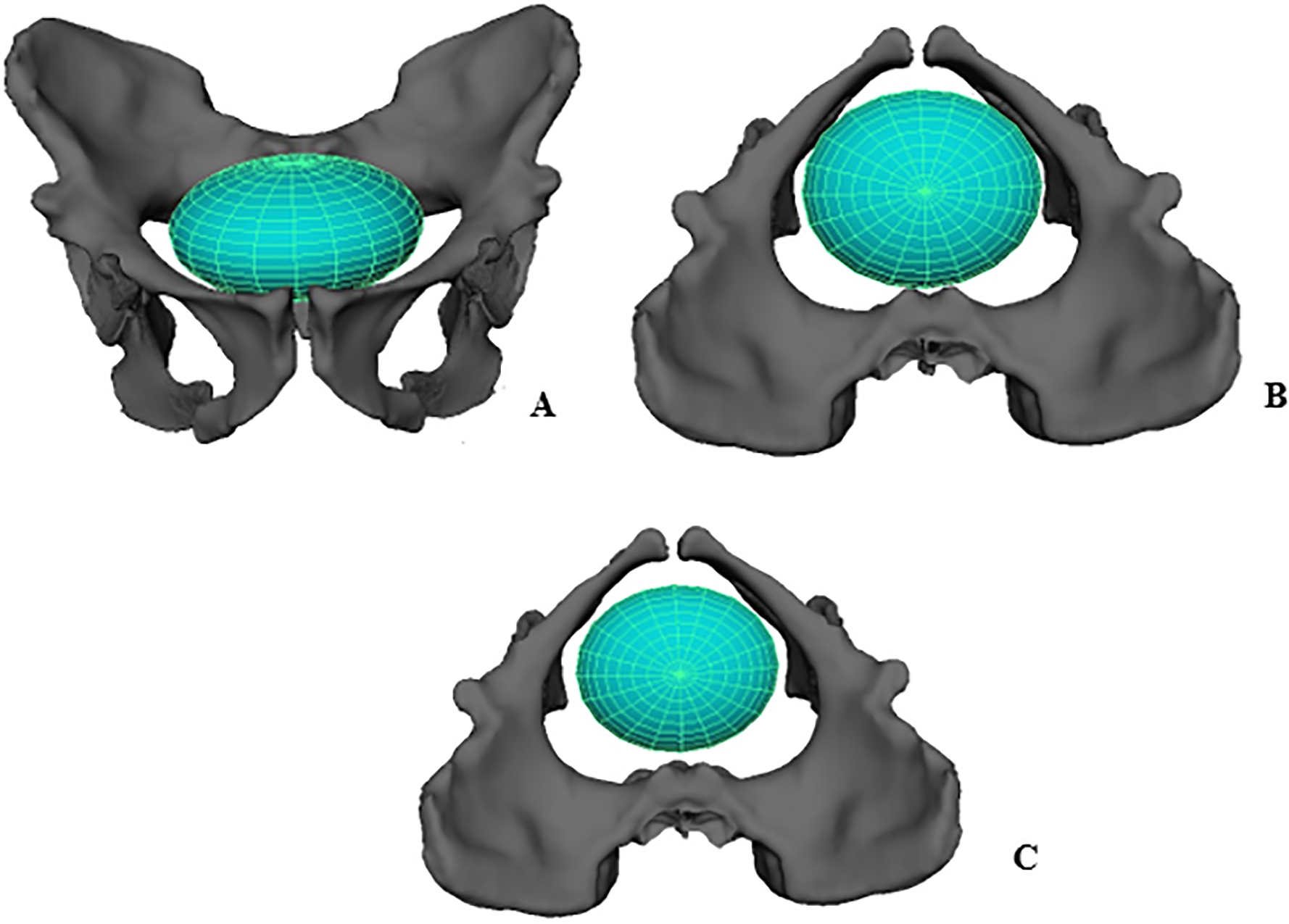
Reconstruction of an A. sediba neonate entering the pelvic inlet (A and B) and the midplane without rotation (C)

The pelvic inlet for a female A. sediba is estimated to have been 80.8 mm × 112.4 mm (3.18 in × 4.43 in) long x broad (sagittal x transverse), and since the neonate head size is estimated to have been 89.2 mm (3.51 in) at longest, the neonate probably entered the pelvic inlet transversely orientated similar to other hominins. The midplane of the pelvic inlet is constricted to a minimum of 96.9 mm (3.81 in), so the neonate may not have needed to be rotated while being birthed. Pelvic inlet dimensions were calculated using a composite reconstruction involving the juvenile male ischium; likewise, the birth canal was possibly actually larger than calculated. The shoulders are estimated to have been 74.3 mm (2.93 in) across, so they would not have obstructed birth more than the head would have. Therefore, the neonate would have occupied, at the point of most constriction, about 92.1% of the birth canal, allowing sufficient room for a completely non-rotational birth as is exhibited in non-human apes and possibly other australopithecines (though a semi-rotational birth is also proposed). Though it is possible to pass without any rotation, the midplane expands anteroposteriorly (from front to back), and there would have been more space for the neonate if it rotated so that the longest length of the head lined up with this expansion.

Modern humans, in comparison, have a much more laborious and complex birth requiring full rotation of the neonate, as the large brain and thus head size, as well as the rigid shoulders, of the human neonate make it much more difficult to fit through the birth canal. Using an estimate of 145.8–180.4 cc for A. sediba neonate brain size, neonate head size would have been 73 mm × 89 mm (2.9 in × 3.5 in), similar to a chimp neonate.

=== Development ===
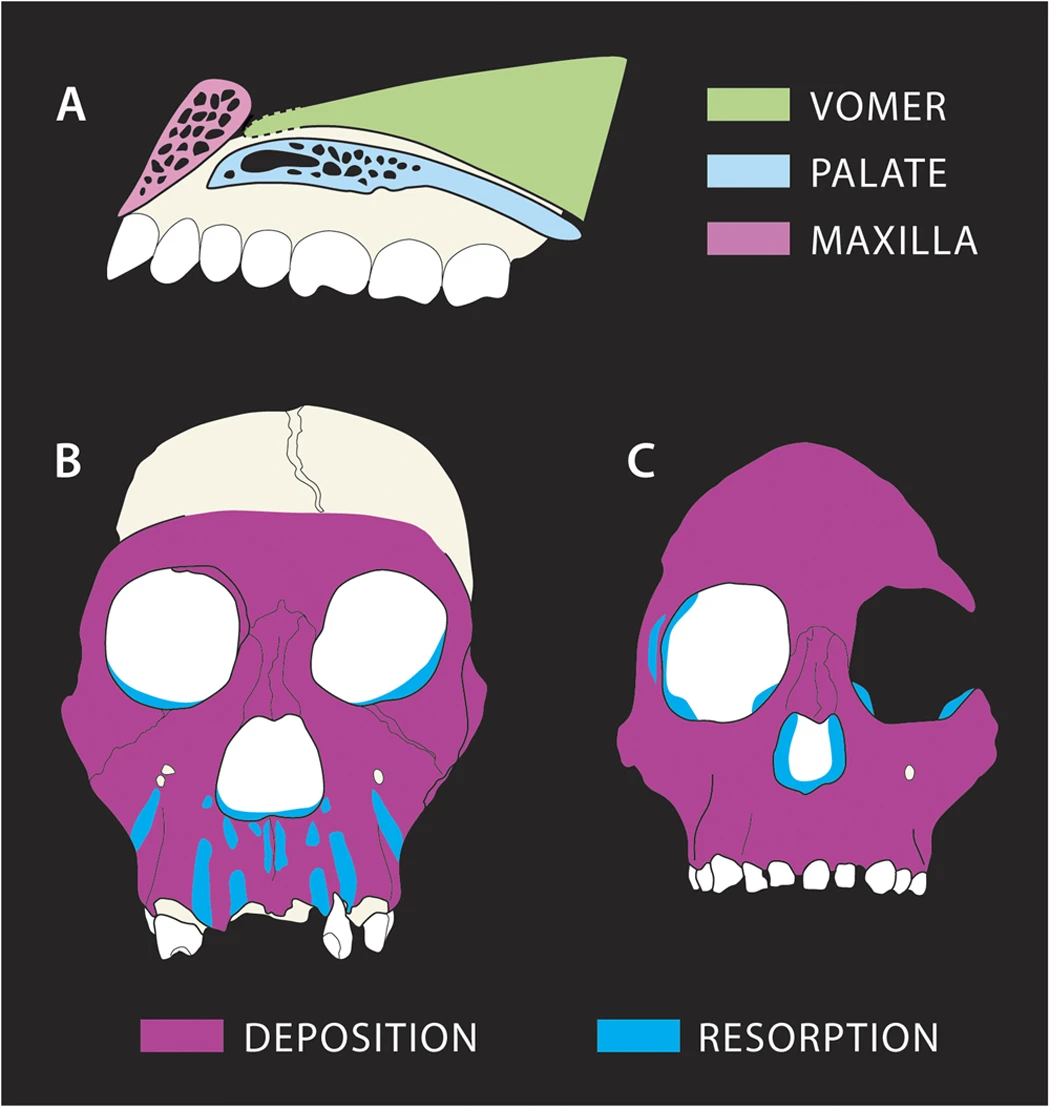
Predicted bone growth patterns in MH1 (A and B) and A. africanus/A. afarensis (C)

Growth trajectory seems to have been noticeably different in MH1 than other hominins. The nasomaxillary (bone from the nose to the upper lip) complex indicates a great degree of bone resorption, most markedly at the tooth roots of the front teeth. This contrasts with A. africanus and A. afarensis which are depository, reflecting increasing prognathism with age. P. robustus also features resorption of the upper jaw, but resorption in MH1 expands along the front teeth to the canine fossa near the cheek bones, resulting in a mesognathic (somewhat protrusive) face, as opposed to a flat face in P. robustus. Because resorption occurs so close to the cheek bones, this may explain why MH1 does not present flaring cheekbones characteristic of A. africanus. Tooth eruption probably did not affect the remodeling of the lower face as MH1 already had all of its permanent teeth. Nonetheless, smaller cheek tooth size may have permitted a mesognathic face. A. sediba apparently had a diet markedly in contrast to typical early hominin diets, possibly one similar to that of the modern-day olive colobus monkey, which mainly eats young leaves; the two species appear to have similar patterns of facial-bone growth. This may indicate diverging resorption and deposition patterns in A. sediba, reflecting different jaw-loading patterns from other hominins. The margins of the eye sockets of MH1 are curved, whereas they are indented in A. africanus, which may indicate bone deposition in A. sediba in regions where bone resorption occurs in A. africanus.

=== Pathology ===
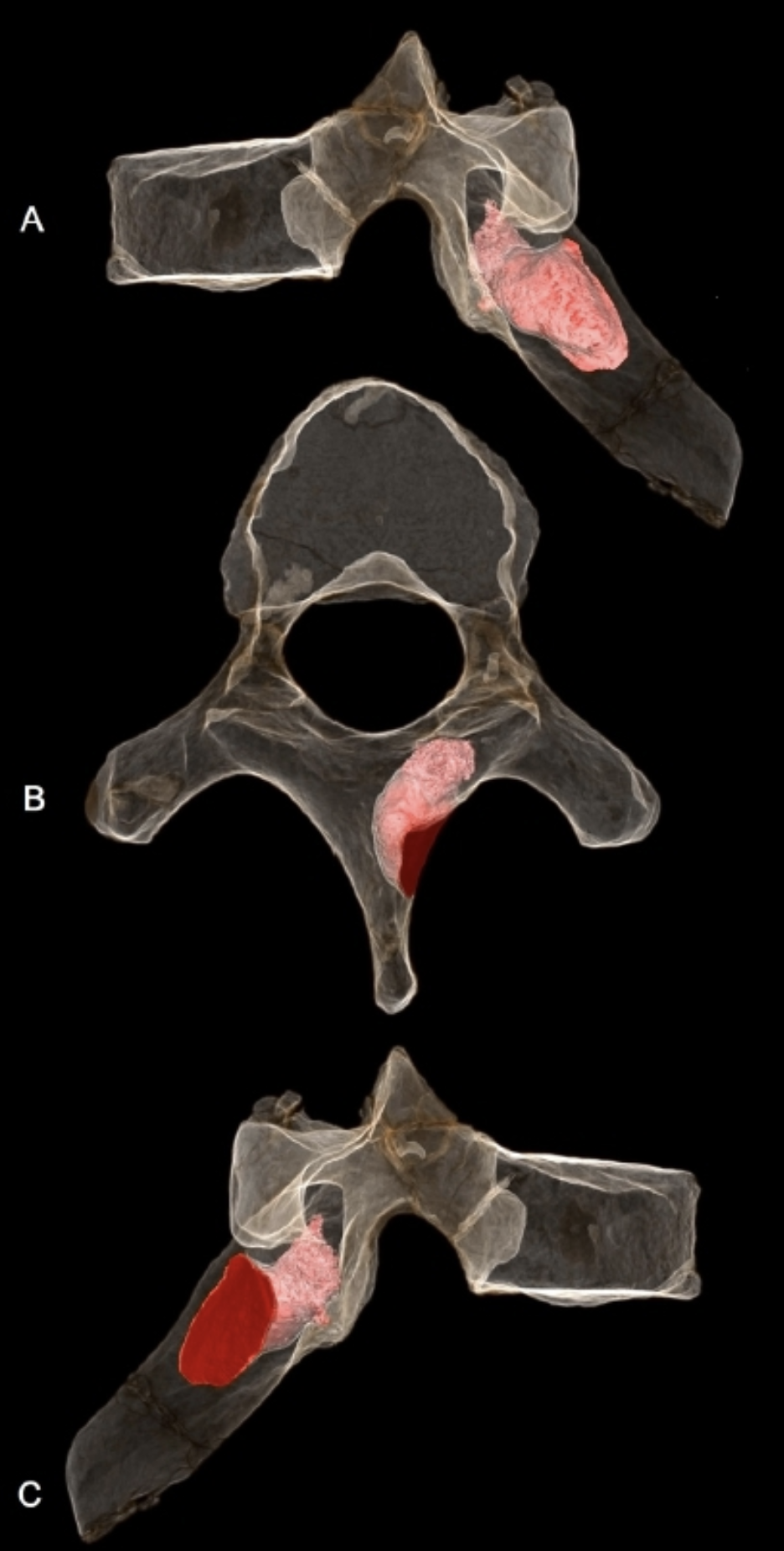
Tumour of MH1 in pink

The right lamina of the sixth thoracic vertebra of MH1 presents a penetrating bone tumour, probably a benign osteoid osteoma. The lesion penetrates 6.7 mm (0.26 in) deep and is 5.9 mm (0.23 in) wide, and was still active at the time of death. It did not penetrate the neural canal so it probably did not cause any neurological complications, and there is no evidence of scoliosis (abnormal curving of the spine). It may have affected movement of the shoulder blade and the upper right quadrant of the back, perhaps causing acute or chronic pain, muscular disturbances, or muscle spasms. Given A. sediba may have required climbing ability, the lesion's position near the insertion for the trapezius, erector spinae, and rhomboid major muscles may have limited normal movement patterns. MH1 has the earliest diagnosed case of cancer for a hominin by at least 200,000 years, predating the 1.8- to 1.6-million-year-old SK 7923 metatarsal fragment presenting osteosarcoma from Swartkrans, Cradle of Humankind. Tumours are rare in the hominin fossil record, likely due to low incidence rate in general for primates; early hominins likely had the same incidence rates as modern primates. The juvenile MH1 developing a bone tumour is consistent with the general trend of bone tumours mostly occurring in younger individuals.

MH1 and MH2 exhibit perimortem (around the time of death) bone injuries consistent with blunt force trauma. This agrees with the interpretation of the site as the base of a tall shaft, acting as a natural death trap that animals accidentally fell into. MH1 and MH2 may have fallen about 5–10 m (16–33 ft) onto a sloping pile of gravel, sand, and bat guano, which probably cushioned the fall to some degree. For MH1, perimortem fracturing is most prominent on the jawbone and teeth, though it is possible that these injuries derived from being hit with a falling object in addition to the fall itself. MH2 bears evidence of bracing during injury, with loading to the forearm and hand and impact to the chest, perimortem fracturing identified on the right side of the body. These are the first deaths in the australopith fossil record confidently not ascribed to predation or natural causes.

== Palaeoecology ==
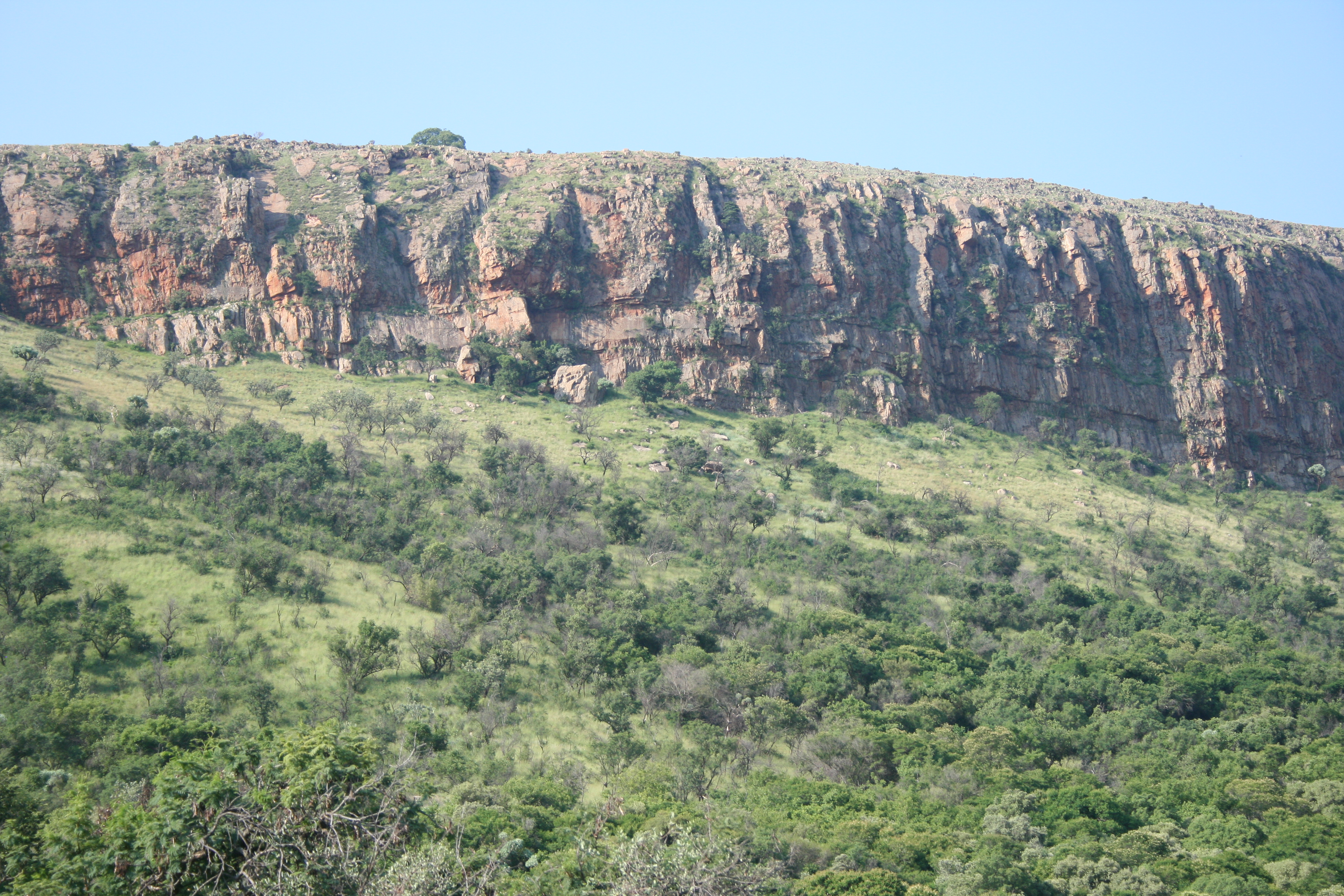
Afromontane biome in the Magaliesberg mountain range

A total of 209 non-hominin fossils were recovered alongside the hominins in facies D and E in 2010, and taxa identified from these are: the sabre-toothed cat Dinofelis barlowi, the leopard, the African wild cat, the black-footed cat, the brown hyena, the cape fox, the mongooses Atilax mesotes and Mungos, a genet, an African wild dog, a horse, a pig, a klipspringer, a Megalotragus antelope, a large alcelaphine antelope, a relative of the harnessed bushbuck, a relative of the greater kudu, and a hare. Today, the black-footed cat and cape fox are endemic to South African grass-, bush-, and scrublands. Similarly, the brown hyena inhabits dry, open habitats and has never been reported in a closed forest setting. Dinofelis and Atilax, on the other hand, are generally indicators of a closed, wet habitat. This may indicate the area featured a closed habitat as well as grasslands—judging by the home range of the cape fox, both existed within 20 km^{2} (7.7 sq mi) of the site.

The coprolite of a carnivore from facies D contained pollen and phytoliths of Podocarpus or Afrocarpus trees, as well as wood fragments from unidentified conifers and dicots. No phytoliths from grasses were found. In modern day, the Malapa site is a grassland, and Podocarpus and Afrocarpus are found 30 km (19 mi) away in the Afromontane forest biome in the canyons 1,500–1,900 m (4,900–6,200 ft) above sea level in the Magaliesberg mountain range, where wildfires are less common. This may indicate that Malapa was a cooler, more humid area than today, allowing for enough fire reduction to allow such forest plants to spread that far beyond naturally sheltered areas. Malapa during the Early Pleistocene may have also been at a somewhat lower elevation than today, with valleys and Magaliesberg being less pronounced.

Australopithecines and early Homo likely preferred cooler conditions than later Homo, as there are no australopithecine sites that were below 1,000 m (3,300 ft) in elevation at the time of deposition. This would mean that, like chimps, they often inhabited areas with an average diurnal temperature of 25 °C (77 °F), dropping to 10 or 5 °C (50 or 41 °F) at night. Malapa Cave is currently 1,442 m (4,731 ft) above sea level. A. sediba lived alongside P. robustus and H. ergaster/H. erectus. Because A. africanus went extinct around this time, it is possible that South Africa was a refugium for Australopithecus until about 2 million years ago with the beginning of major climatic variability and volatility, and potentially competition with Homo and Paranthropus.

== See also ==
- African archaeology
- Australopithecus africanus – Extinct hominid from South Africa
- Homo ergaster – Extinct species or subspecies of archaic human
- Homo gautengensis – Name proposed for an extinct species of hominin from South Africa
- Homo habilis – Archaic human species from 2.4 to 1.65 mya
- Homo naledi – South African archaic human species
- Paranthropus boisei – Extinct species of hominin of East Africa
- Paranthropus robustus – Extinct species of hominin of South Africa
