= Ronald J. Clarke =

South African paleoanthropologist

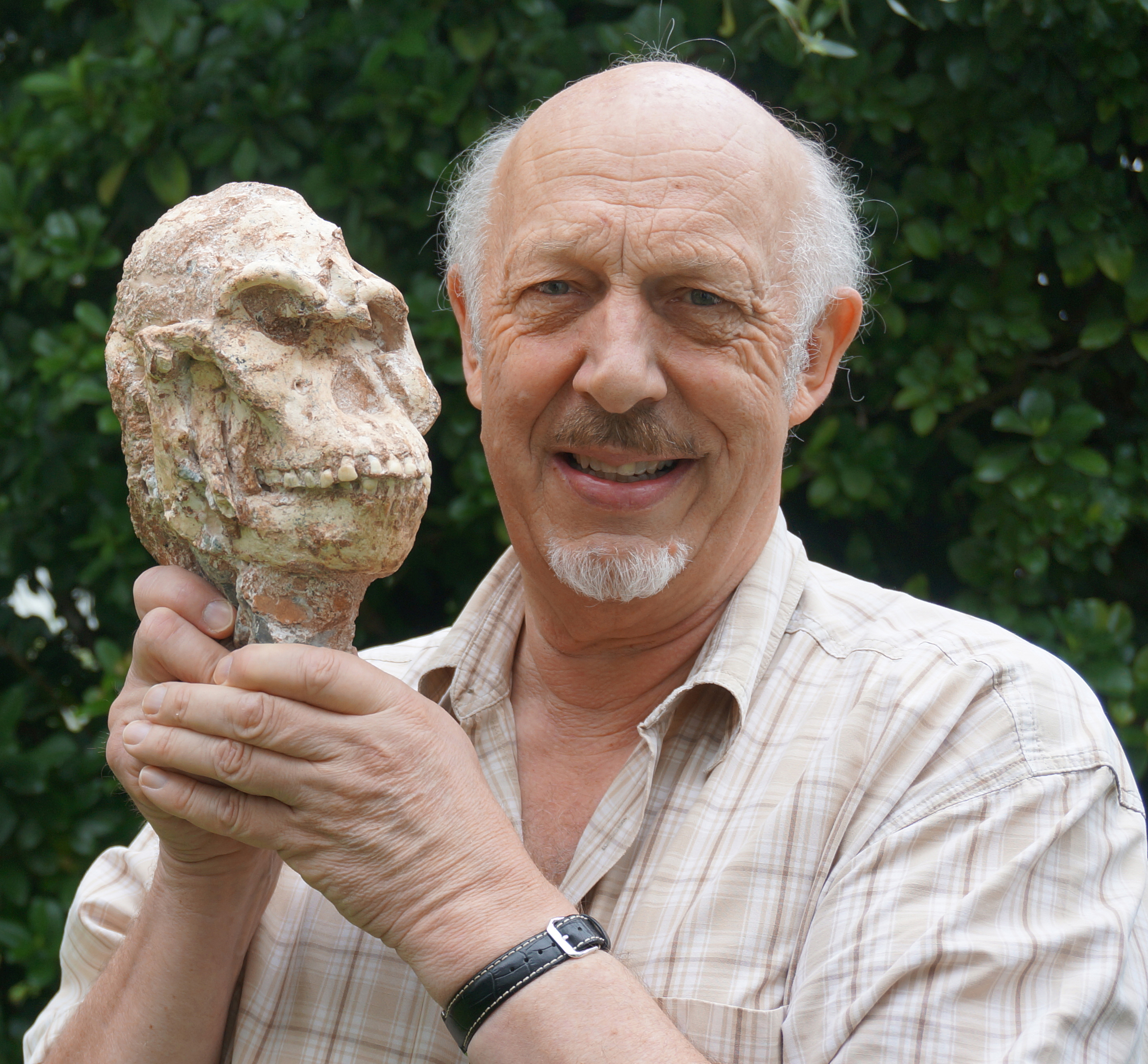
- Ronald Clarke in 2015
- Scientific career
- Fields: Paleoanthropology
- Institutions: Johann Wolfgang Goethe University of Frankfurt am Main; University of the Witwatersrand
- Website: www.wits.ac.za/staff/academic-a-z-listing/c/ronaldclarkewitsacza/

Ronald John Clarke is a paleoanthropologist most notable for the discovery of "Little Foot", an extraordinarily complete skeleton of Australopithecus, in the Sterkfontein Caves. A more technical description of various aspects of his description of the Australopithecus skeleton was published in the Journal of Quaternary Science.

He also discovered the Homo ergaster partial cranium SK 847. He also played a role in the discovery of a new skeleton of Homo habilis related to Homo rudolfensis.

He was associated with the University of the Witwatersrand, then joined Johann Wolfgang Goethe University of Frankfurt am Main in Frankfurt, Germany where he continued his work excavating "Little Foot". He later rejoined the University of the Witwatersrand's Institute for Human Evolution, where he remains as of present.

== Discoveries ==
=== Early discoveries ===
In the late 1970s, Ronald J. Clarke made discoveries of early Hominins in the Swartkrans cave in South Africa. He discovered the partial cranium of specimen SK46 and SK 879. Clarke used the temporal bones of these specimens to compare them to similar bones in chimpanzees and other apes. Clarke had also discovered the SK 848 specimen, which had an ear that was far distinct from Homo sapiens.

=== Discovering Little Foot ===
Ronald J. Clarke and his expedition team explored the Sterkfontein Cave, located 40 kilometers from the capital of South Africa, Johannesburg. After years of excavating and exploring, in 1994, Clarke made a profound discovery after finding four Australopithecus bones that were joined together. The discovery that these four bones were fragments of a foot led the excavation team to nickname their finding "Little Foot". Three years later, Clarke’s excavation team were able to find more fragments of "Little Foot", which included the tibia and other parts of the legs. After this discovery, Clarke and his team excavated the rest of the cave in order to find the missing fragments of "Little Foot". Throughout the years excavating, Clarke was able to nearly fully assemble the Australopithecus skeleton in the Sterkfontein Cave.

=== Early excavations ===
Ronald J. Clarke excavated the Sterkfontein Cave with two South African anthropologists, Nkwane Molefe and Stephen Motsumi in 1994. Clarke used hammers and chisels in order to extract additional fragments of "Little Foot". After finding two large fragments of the lower leg, Clarke became convinced that the rest of the fragments were located within the Silberberg Grotto of the Sterkfontein Cave. He chiseled away at the breccia inside the Silberberg Grotto and found a hominid humerus. After finding the humerus, a cast was made and the team continued to search for more bones. Two assistants took the casts around the cave to try and find a match to the ends. After searching deeper in the cave, the team was able to discover more bones encased in the breccia. A mandible was found still attached to the cranium. These bones allowed him to conclude that the mandible had ape-like features and that there were likely other limb bones deeper in the breccia. He soon after found a portion of the skull of "Little Foot". The skull that Clarke discovered was the most complete skull of an Australopithecus up to that point. From these bones, Clarke was able to conclude that the skeleton was approximately 3.5 million years old.

== Genus name and designation ==
Clarke assigned the "Little Foot" bones to the specimen Stw 573 and categorized this Australopithecus as belonging to the Australopithecus africanus species. Clarke believed that the structure of the skeleton of "Little Foot" suggested that they had apelike functions. The foot that Clarke examined at the Sterkfontein Cave had many characteristics that resembled those of an ape's foot, with only a slight resemblance to the modern human foot.

== See also ==
- List of fossil sites (with link directory)
- List of hominina (hominid) fossils (with images)
