= Little Foot =

Hominin fossil

Coordinates: 26°00′57″S 27°44′04″E

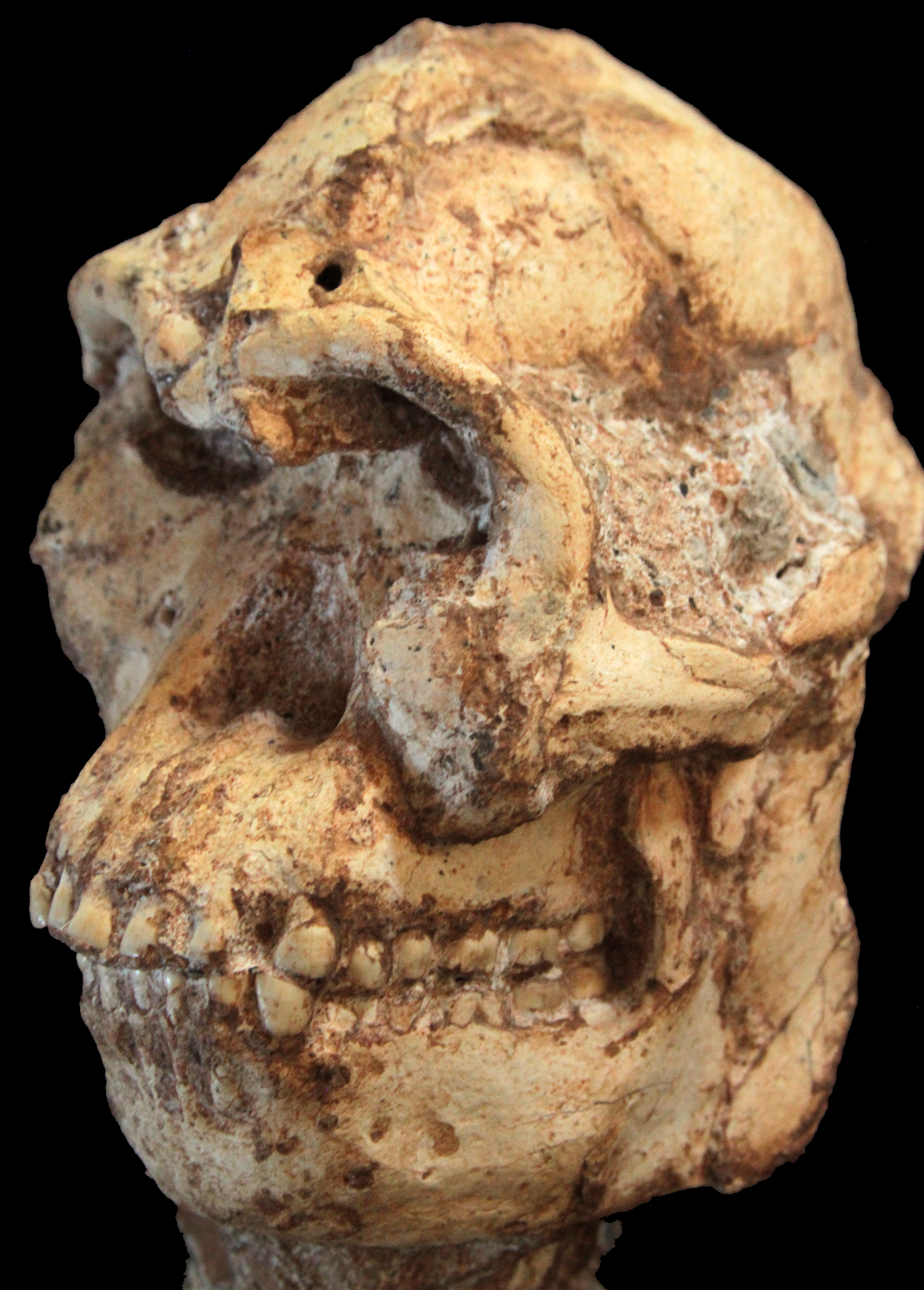
- Catalog no.: Stw 573
- Common name: Little Foot
- Species: Australopithecus, species uncertain
- Age: c. 3.67 million years
- Place discovered: Gauteng, South Africa
- Date discovered: 1994
- Discovered by: Ronald Clarke

"Little Foot" (Stw 573) is the nickname given to a nearly complete Australopithecus fossil skeleton found in 1994 in the cave system of Sterkfontein, South Africa.

The skeleton was originally nicknamed "Little Foot" in 1995 when four ankle bones in a museum collection were sufficient to ascertain that the individual had been able to walk upright. The remainder of the skeleton was subsequently located in the cave from which the ankle bones had been collected.

Because the bones were completely embedded in concrete-like rock, their extremely difficult and tedious extraction took around 15 years. The bones proved to be the most complete skeleton of the early hominin lineage leading to humans, with 90% of the body being recovered.

Dating of the specimen has proved controversial, with estimates ranging from 2.2 to 3.67 million years old, and its taxonomic placement is likewise disputed.

== Discovery ==
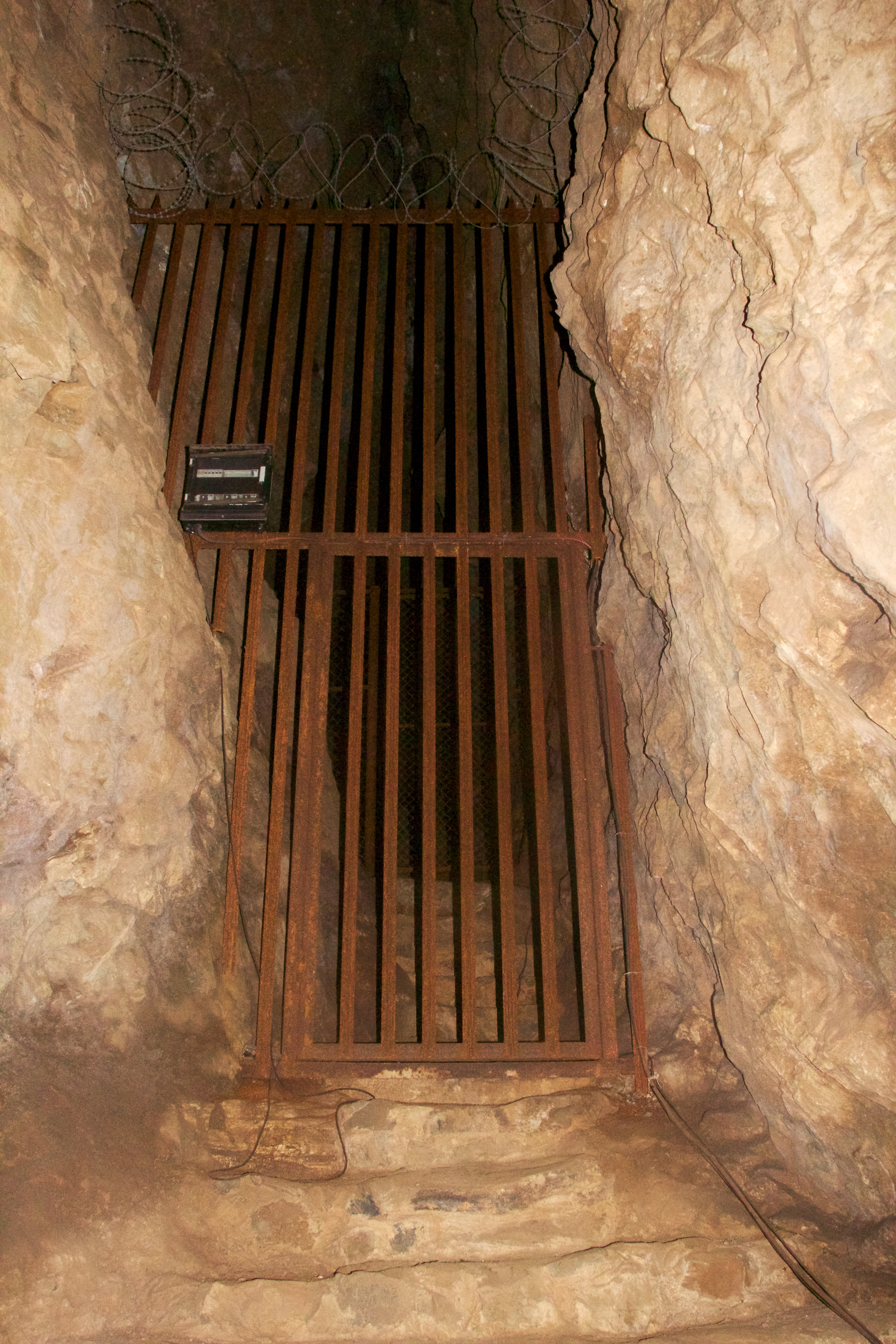
The location where the remains of Little Foot were excavated

Four ankle bones of this specimen were collected in 1980 but were unidentified among numerous other mammal bones. Only after 1992, on initiative by Phillip Tobias, a large rock was blown up in the cave that contained an unusual accumulation of fossils. The fossils recovered were taken from the cave and scrutinized thoroughly by paleoanthropologist Ronald Clarke.

In 1994 while searching through museum boxes labelled 'Cercopithecoids' containing fossil fragments, Ronald Clarke identified several that were unmistakably hominin. He spotted four left foot bones (the talus, navicular, medial cuneiform, and first metatarsal) that were most likely from the same individual. These fragments came from the Silberberg Grotto, a large cavern within the Sterkfontein cave system. They were described as belonging to the genus Australopithecus, and catalogued as Stw 573.

Due to the diminutive nature of the bones, they were dubbed "Little Foot". Clarke found further foot bones from the same individual in separate bags in 1997, including a right fragment of the distal tibia that had been clearly sheared off from the rest of the bone. Early in 1997, two fossil preparators and assistants of Clarke, Stephen Motsumi and Nkwane Molefe, were sent to the Silberberg Grotto to try to find the matching piece of tibia from which the museum specimen had been broken.

Amazingly, within two days, they found the remaining part of the bone protruding from the rock in the lower part of the grotto. Though only the bones of both legs were visible, because they were in anatomically correct arrangement the team speculated that it could be a complete skeleton that was embedded with the face downward in the limestone.

In the following months, Clarke and his two assistants with the help of a hammer and small chisel uncovered further foot bones. Stephen Motsumi discovered the first remains of the upper body, an upper arm bone on 11 September 1998, and eventually the head of the individual was seen as well. It was a skull connected with the lower jaw, which was facing up. These were announced to the press in 1998, resulting in considerable media attention around the world.

A year later, in July and August 1999, a left forearm as well as the corresponding left hand were discovered and partly uncovered. These were again in anatomically correct arrangement. Subsequent work has uncovered a relatively complete skeleton, including parts of the pelvis, ribs and vertebrae, a complete humerus and most of the lower limb bones.

At the time, it was recognized that it was likely to be far more complete than the famous Australopithecus afarensis skeleton, "Lucy", from the site of Hadar, Ethiopia. Clarke reported this discovery six months later and explained that all previous analyses indicated that the fossil's body was apparently complete and was possibly slightly moved by ground movements and also not damaged by predators. It took Clarke and his team two full decades to fully extricate, clean, and analyze the specimen, work that was finally completed in 2017.

== Characteristics ==
StW 573 (Little Foot) is a nearly complete case of an Australopithecus female specimen, including the skull, that provides plenty of information on this once obscure species that helps advance perspective on them. In the discovery of the cast, there was evidence of dental use where it shows to be prominent. Resemblances can be drawn to other cases found in South Africa, such as that of Australopithecus afarensis. The specimen is a female, 1.2-1.3 meters tall, whose lower limbs are longer than its upper limbs. Its hips are modern and capable of transmitting great force from its legs, and its hands are very large. Her body suggests a bipedal gait and, at the same time, that she had a great ability to climb trees. Morphological characteristics of StW 573's fossil are the complete limb lengths that demonstrate that StW 573 stood roughly to the height of 4 feet and that it exhibited forms of bipedalism due to the length of its legs. Although, StW 573 also prominently displays many features that other apes present such as an S-shaped curve in its collarbone along with a ventral bar. Other fragments of the cast such as the pectoral girdle and the high ridge of StW 573's shoulder blades suggest that it had a strong upper body to support its weight while it hung from branches and climbed trees. Overall this cast shows characteristics found in both human and other primates as it exhibits signs of walking upright, early bipedalism, and locomotion through the trees.

== Classification ==
First, the discovery (archive No. STW 573) was not assigned to any particular species in the genus Australopithecus. In the first description in July 1995 it was said, "The bones are probably an early member of Australopithecus africanus or another early species of hominids". After 1998, when a part of the skull had been discovered and uncovered, Clarke pointed out now that the fossils were probably associated with the genus Australopithecus, but whose 'unusual features' do not match any Australopithecus species previously described.

Clarke now suggests that Little Foot does not belong to the species Australopithecus afarensis or Australopithecus africanus, but to a unique Australopithecus species previously found at Makapansgat and Sterkfontein Member Four, Australopithecus prometheus. However, Martin et al. (2025) suggested that Little Foot does not belong to Australopithecus prometheus, and that A. prometheus represents a junior synonym of Australopithecus africanus.

Following the discovery of the around 2 million year old Australopithecus sediba, which had been discovered just 15 km away from Sterkfontein in the Malapa northern cave in 2008, the assumption was made that an ancestor of Australopithecus could be sediba. As with any new discovery, there is always an argument between the lumpers and splitters.

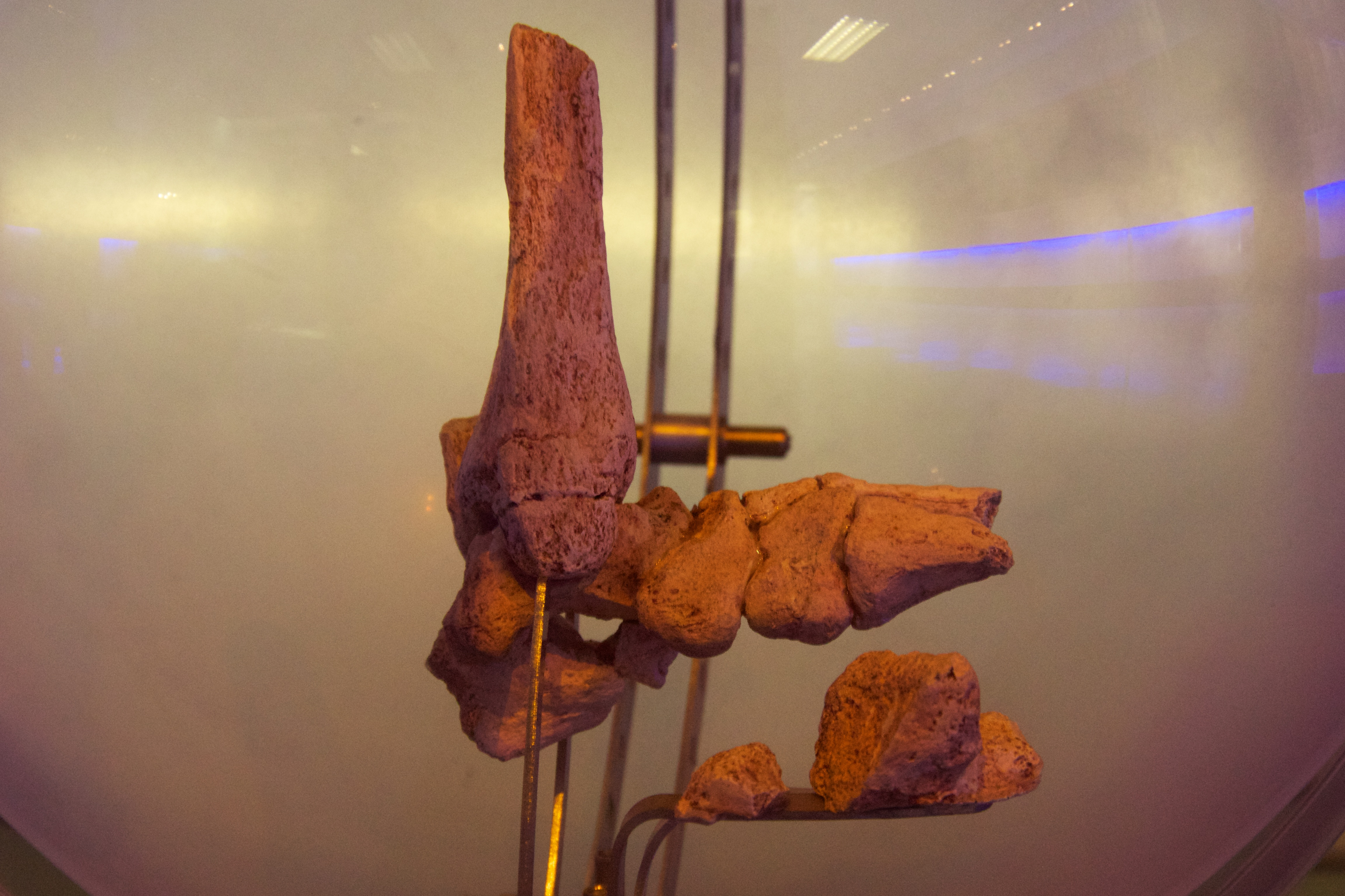
Little Foot foot bones

== Dating ==
Due to the lack of volcanic layers at the site, dating was difficult. An estimated date was published in 1995, which was based on relative dating of old world monkeys and some carnivores. The dates ranged from 3–3.5 million years old, and it was due to this that the fossils were described as the oldest known representative of hominids in South Africa.

This date was heavily criticized in 1996 and was thought to have been dated too early. A second analysis put the date around 2.5 million years old and was more widely accepted. Another study on Little Foot came to a similar conclusion in 2002, revising its age at "younger than 3 million".

The controversial dating on this fossil is primarily due to the age of formation of the rocks that surrounded its fossilized skeleton. The reason for the 2.2 million years dating is primarily caused by the age of flowstones that surrounded the skeleton. These flowstones filled voids from ancient erosion and collapse and formed around 2.2 million years ago, however the skeleton is thought to be older.

The Little Foot specimen dating made in 2015 estimates it to 3.67 million years old by means of a new radioisotopic technique. Results in 2014 estimated the specimen to be around 3.3 million years old. Earlier attempts date it 2.2 million years, or between 3.03 and 2.04 million years.

== How "Little Foot" lived ==
In 1995, the first description of the four first discovered foot bones was published. The authors explained that this Australopithecus specimen walked upright but was also able to live in trees with the help of grasping movements. This would be possible due to the still opposable big toe.

The construction of the foot differs only slightly from a chimpanzee. Clarke saw foot bones discovered in 1998 which confirmed this initial assessment. His description, according to the known Laetoli footprints of Australopithecus and the arrangement of the foot bones discovered in the Silberberg Grotto, exhibits a high degree of compliance.

In his 1999 description of the fossil bones of the hand, Clarke pointed out that the length of the palm of the hand as well as the length of the finger bone was significantly shorter than that of chimpanzees and gorillas. The hand was like that of modern humans, known as relatively unspecialized.

Referring to predator finds, who lived at the time of the Australopithecus in Africa, Clarke joined the view of Jordi Sabater who in 1997 had argued that sleeping on the ground at night was too dangerous for Australopithecus. He believed it seemed more likely that Australopithecus slept in the trees, similar to today's living chimpanzees and gorillas that make sleeping nests. Due to the features of the fossil, he also believed it likely that Australopithecus spent parts of their days searching for food in the trees.

At the end of 2008, Clarke published a reconstruction of the circumstances which allowed the fossil to remain so unusually well preserved in contrast to other bones found in the same cave, which apparently had been washed over longer periods of time in their final storage location. The fossil also shows no damage by predators so the assumption can be made that the fossils were not moved to the cave by predators to be fed on. However, individual bones are broken, which possibly can be traced back to the quarry work in the early 20th century. The opening could have become clogged with materials such as rocks, so no water could penetrate and wash away the bones of the remaining carcass.

== See also ==
- List of fossil sites (with link directory)
- List of human evolution fossils (with images)

== Bibliography ==
- Sáez, Roberto (2019). Evolución humana: Prehistoria y origen de la compasión (in Spanish). Editorial Almuzara. ISBN 978-84-18089-49-7.
