= Darren Curnoe =

Australian Paleoanthropologist

- Education: Australian National University
- Known for: Naming of Homo gautengensis and discovery of Red Deer Cave people
- Awards: Shanghai Archaeology Prize (2013)
- Scientific career
- Fields: Anthropology, archaeology
- Workplaces: University of NSW

Darren Curnoe is an Australian anthropologist working as an Associate Professor at the University of New South Wales investigating human origins.

He is known for research of human evolution, particularly in Australasia. In 2010 he proposed naming a new species Homo gautengensis; and discovered the remains of the Red Deer Cave people.

== Education and Career ==
Curnoe was educated at the Australian National University, earning a Doctorate of Philosophy in Palaeoanthropology and Geochronology in 2000 before completing a Post-Doctoral Research Fellow at the University of Witwatersrand in 2002 working with renowned paleoanthropologist Philip Tobias.

In 2002 he was appointed lecturer for the University of New South Wales.

In 2010, Curnoe proposed naming a new species of South African hominin, Homo gautengensis. However, recognition of the species has been limited.

In 2012 he and Professor Ji Xueping discovered the remains of an archaic population of Homo sapiens in southwestern China later named the 'Red Deer Cave people'. In 2013 the discovery was named the most significant archaeological finding from 2011 to 2012 at the Shanghai Archaeological Forum. The Discovery Award is made for archaeological excavations or surveys that yield major discoveries that significantly further or alter knowledge of the human past, and is considered prestigious. The discovery was the subject of the 2014 television documentary Enigma Man: A Stone Age Mystery.

Also in 2015, Curnoe was one of three finalists in the 2015 Australian Department of Industry and Science Eureka Prize for Promoting Understanding of Australian Science Research, although the award went to Emma Johnston.

In 2018 Curnoe co-lead, with members of the Sarawak Museum, an excavation team in a cave in Borneo investigating early human remains that could shed light on when Homo sapiens first arrived in South-East Asia.
