= Pelvic tilt =

Orientation of the pelvis

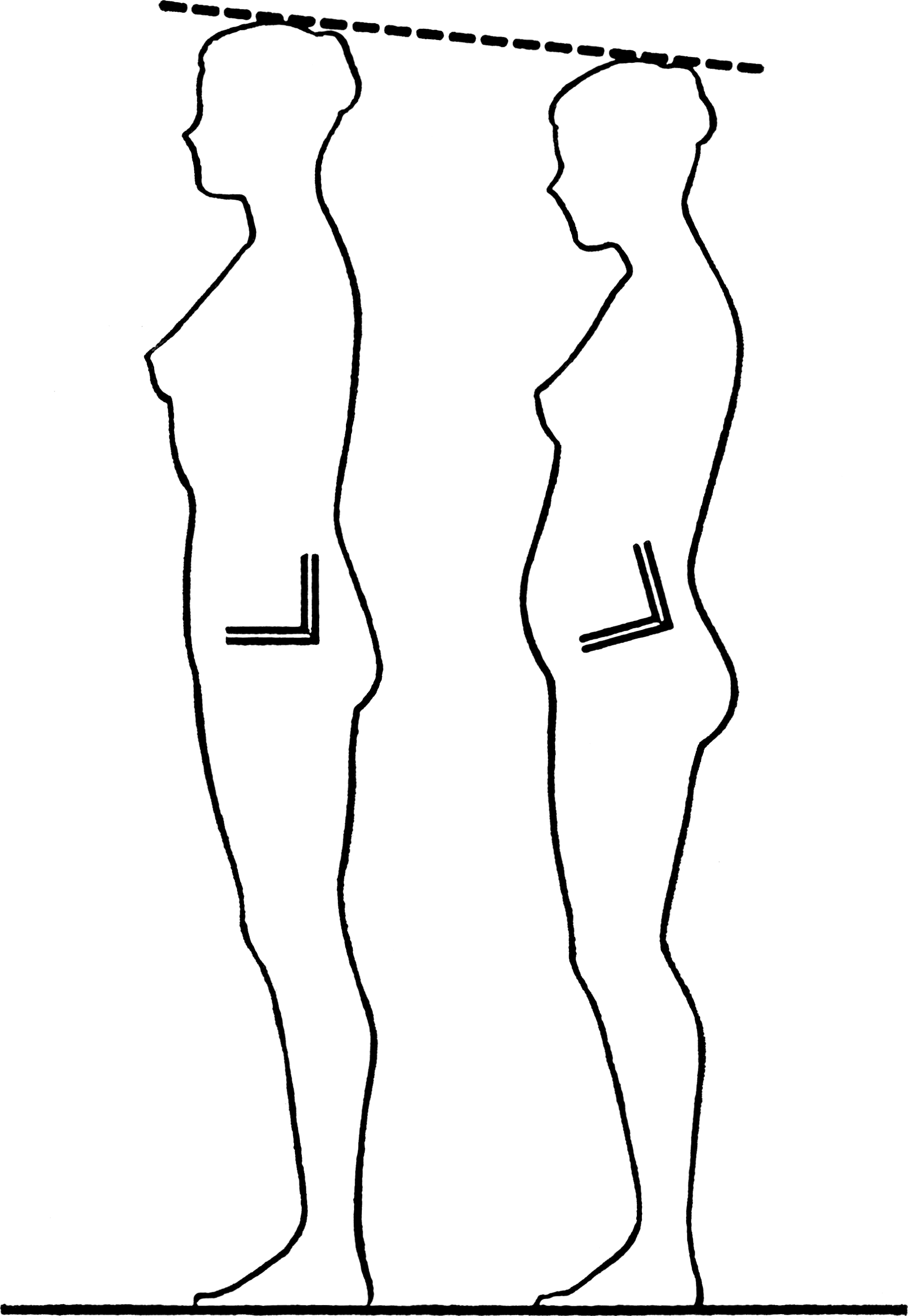
A visual comparison between a neutral and anterior pelvic tilt and how it can affect height.

Pelvic tilt is the orientation of the pelvis in respect to the thighbones and the rest of the body. The pelvis can tilt towards the front, back, or either side of the body.

Anterior pelvic tilt and posterior pelvic tilt are very common abnormalities in regard to the orientation of the pelvis.

== Forms ==
- Anterior pelvic tilt (APT) is a postural pattern in which the front of the pelvis drops in relationship to the back of the pelvis. For example, this results from the hip flexors shortening and the hip extensors lengthening. It is also called lumbar hyperlordosis, which is characterized by an exaggerated curve in the lower back.
- Posterior pelvic tilt (PPT) is the opposite: the front of the pelvis rises and the back of the pelvis drops. For example, this happens when the hip flexors lengthen and the hip extensors shorten, particularly the gluteus maximus which is the primary extensor of the hip.
- Lateral pelvic tilt (LPT) describes tilting toward either right or left and is associated with scoliosis or people who have legs of different length. It can also happen when one leg is bent while the other remains straight, in that case the bent side's hip can follow the femur as knee lowers towards the ground.
  - In left pelvic tilt, the right side of the pelvis is higher than the left side.
  - In right pelvic tilt, the left side of the pelvis is higher than the right side.

== Treatment ==
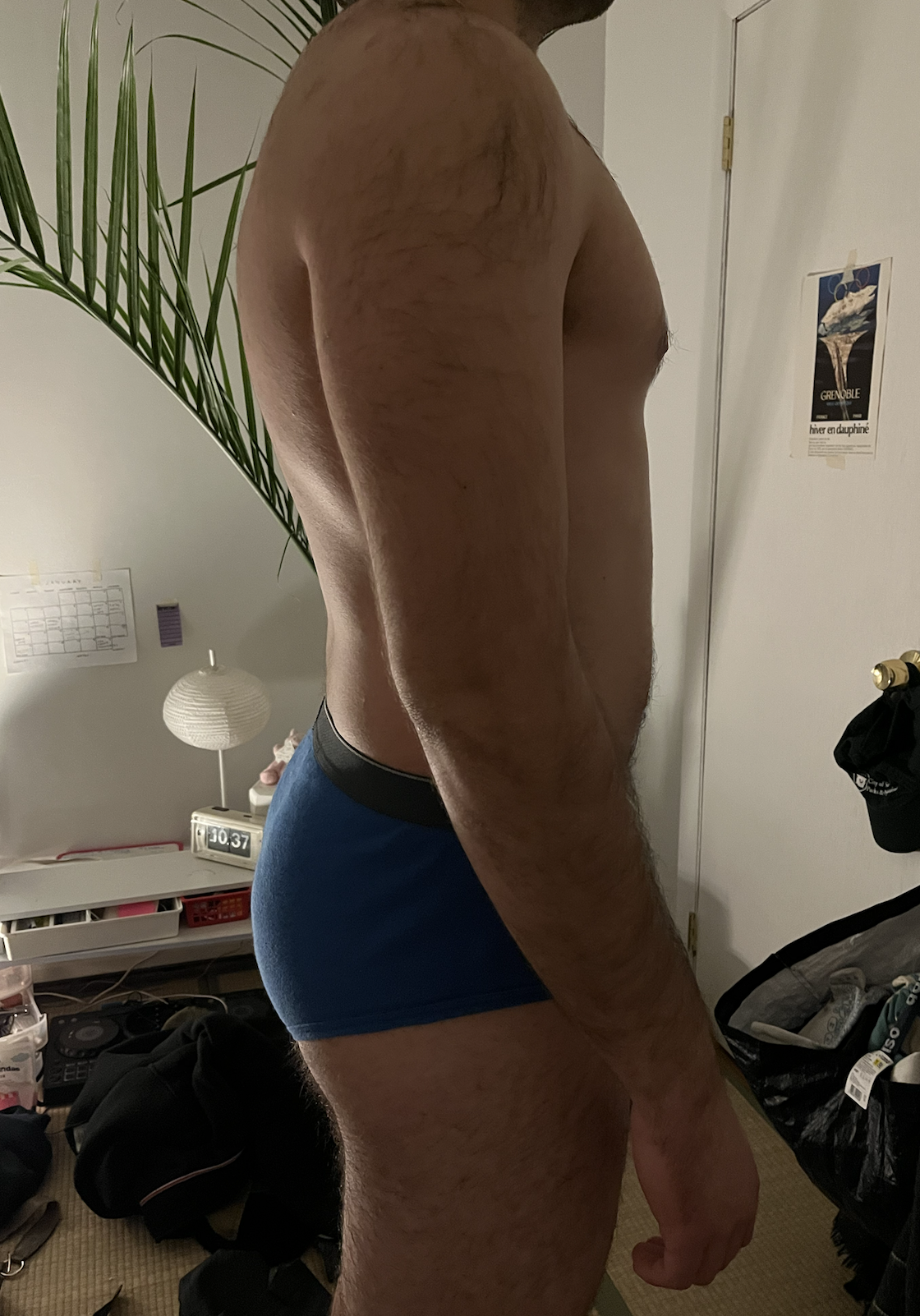
Man with anterior pelvic tilt from the side

Anterior Pelvic Tilt (APT): Treatment focuses on strengthening the glutes, core, and lower back muscles while stretching the hip flexors. Exercises such as glute bridges, planks,side planks ,dead bugs and hip thrusts help restore alignment and counteract muscle imbalances.

Posterior Pelvic Tilt (PPT): For PPT, strengthening the lower back and hip extensors is crucial, along with stretching the hip flexors and abdominal muscles. Exercises like back extensions and glute bridges are often recommended for restoring neutral pelvic alignment.

Lateral Pelvic Tilt (LPT): LPT treatment involves addressing the root cause, such as scoliosis or leg length discrepancies. Balancing exercises for the hips and improving spinal posture, along with orthotics, may help correct imbalances.

== See also ==
- Kyphosis
- Lordosis
- Scoliosis
- Spina bifida
