= Paleoanthropology =

Study of ancient humans

Paleoanthropology or paleo-anthropology is a branch of paleontology and anthropology which seeks to understand the early development of anatomically modern humans, a process known as hominization, through the reconstruction of evolutionary kinship lines within the family Hominidae, many of which are now extinct, working from biological evidence (such as petrified skeletal remains, bone fragments, footprints) and cultural evidence (such as stone tools, artifacts, and settlement localities).

The field draws from and combines primatology, paleontology, biological anthropology, and cultural anthropology. As technologies and methods advance, genetics plays an ever-increasing role, in particular to examine and compare DNA structure as a vital tool of research of the evolutionary kinship lines of related species and genera.

== Etymology ==
The term paleoanthropology derives from Greek palaiós (παλαιός) "old, ancient", ánthrōpos (ἄνθρωπος) "man, human" and the suffix -logía (-λογία) "study of".

== Hominoid taxonomies ==
Hominoids are a primate superfamily, the hominid family is currently considered to comprise both the great ape lineages and human lineages within the hominoid superfamily. The "Homininae" comprise both the human lineages and the African ape lineages. The term "African apes" refers only to chimpanzees and gorillas. The terminology of the immediate biological family is currently in flux. The term "hominin" refers to any genus in the human tribe (Hominini), of which Homo sapiens (modern humans) is the only living specimen.

Suborder Hominoids
Family Hominids
Subfamily Homininae
Tribe Gorillini	Tribe Hominini
Genus Ardipithecus (extinct)	Genus Australopithecus (extinct)	Genus Paranthropus (extinct)	Genus Kenyanthropus (extinct)	Genus Homo (extant)

== History ==
=== 18th century ===
In 1758 Carl Linnaeus introduced the name Homo sapiens as a species name in the 10th edition of his work Systema Naturae although without a scientific description of the species-specific characteristics. Since the great apes were considered the closest relatives of human beings, based on morphological similarity, in the 19th century, it was speculated that the closest living relatives to humans were chimpanzees (genus Pan) and gorilla (genus Gorilla), and based on the natural range of these creatures, it was surmised that humans shared a common ancestor with African apes and that fossils of these ancestors would ultimately be found in Africa.

=== 19th century ===
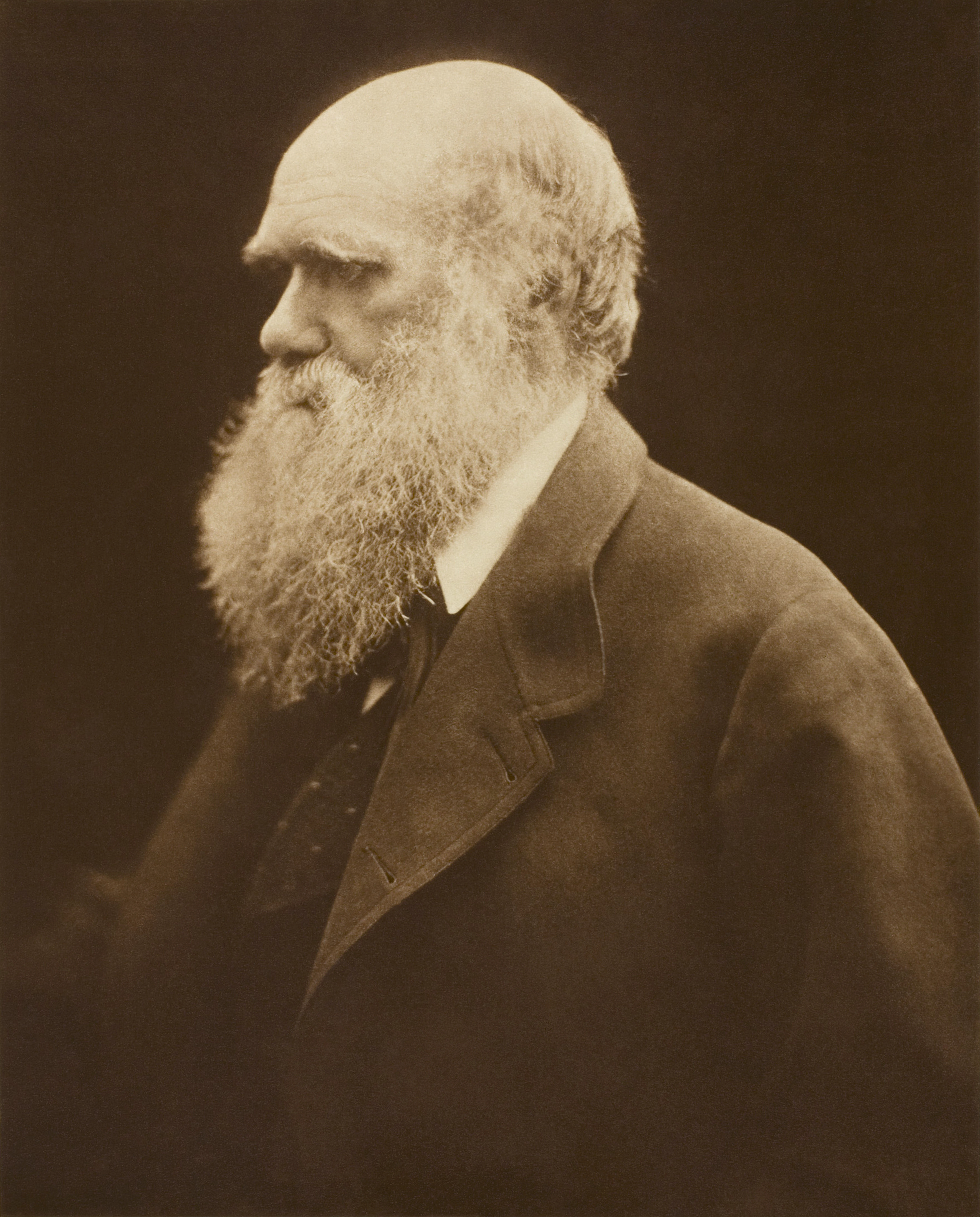
Charles Darwin

The science arguably began in the late 19th century when important discoveries occurred that led to the study of human evolution. The discovery of the Neanderthal in Germany, Thomas Huxley's Evidence as to Man's Place in Nature, and Charles Darwin's The Descent of Man were all important to early paleoanthropological research.

The modern field of paleoanthropology began in the 19th century with the discovery of "Neanderthal man" (the eponymous skeleton was found in 1856, but there had been finds elsewhere since 1830), and with evidence of so-called cave men. The idea that humans are similar to certain great apes had been obvious to people for some time, but the idea of the biological evolution of species in general was not legitimized until after Charles Darwin published On the Origin of Species in 1859.

Though Darwin's first book on evolution did not address the specific question of human evolution—"light will be thrown on the origin of man and his history," was all Darwin wrote on the subject—the implications of evolutionary theory were clear to contemporary readers.

Debates between Thomas Huxley and Richard Owen focused on the idea of human evolution. Huxley convincingly illustrated many of the similarities and differences between humans and apes in his 1863 book Evidence as to Man's Place in Nature. By the time Darwin published his own book on the subject, Descent of Man, it was already a well-known interpretation of his theory—and the interpretation which made the theory highly controversial. Even many of Darwin's original supporters (such as Alfred Russel Wallace and Charles Lyell) balked at the idea that human beings could have evolved their apparently boundless mental capacities and moral sensibilities through natural selection.

=== Asia ===
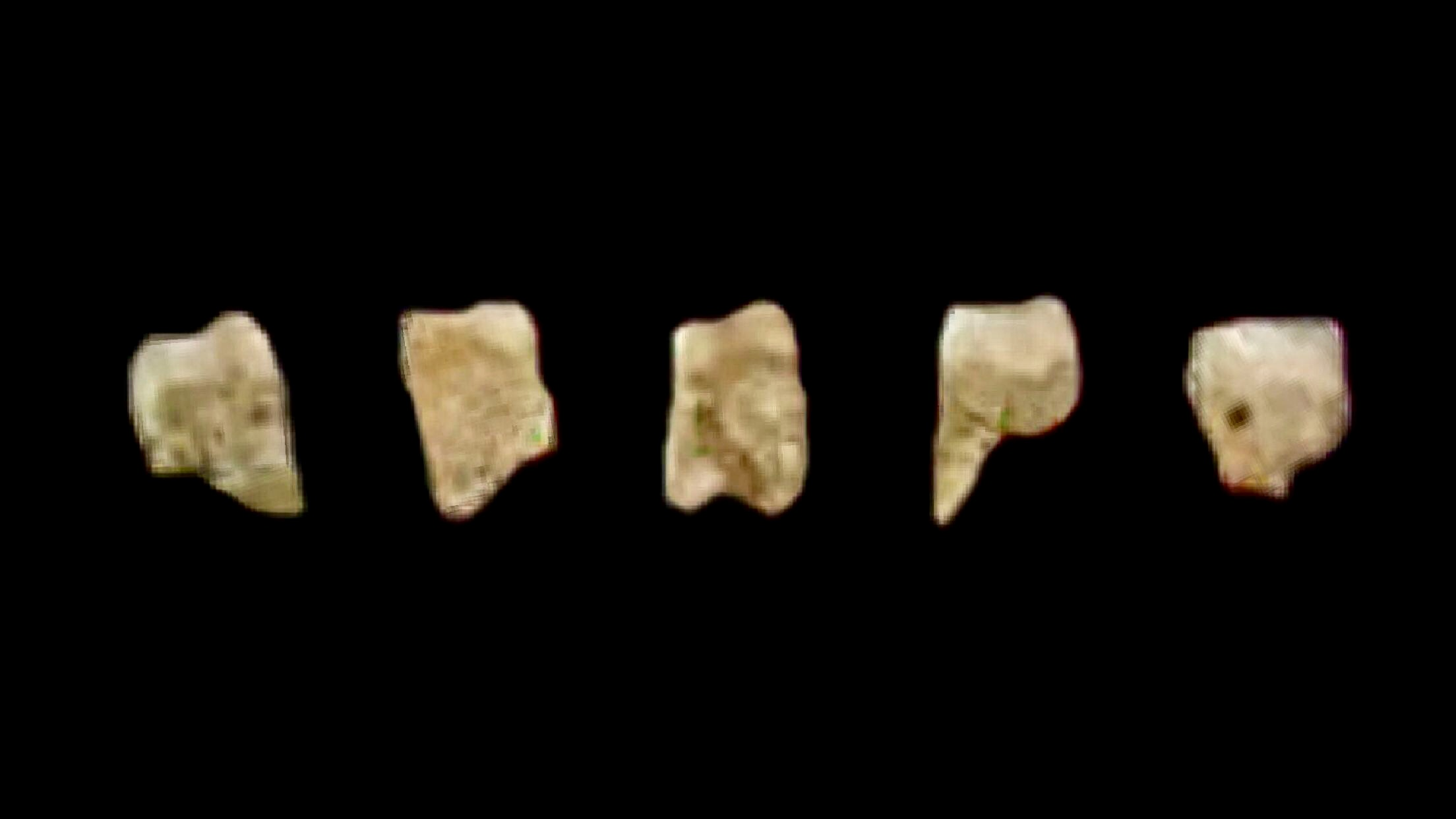
Five of the seven known fossil teeth of Homo luzonensis found in Callao Cave, the Philippines.

Prior to the general acceptance of Africa as the root of genus Homo, 19th-century naturalists sought the origin of humans in Asia. So-called "dragon bones" (fossil bones and teeth) from Chinese apothecary shops were known, but it was not until the early 20th century that German paleontologist Max Schlosser first described a single human tooth from Beijing. Although Schlosser (1903) was very cautious, identifying the tooth only as "?Anthropoide g. et sp. indet?," he was hopeful that future work would discover a new anthropoid in China.

Eleven years later, the Swedish geologist Johan Gunnar Andersson was sent to China as a mining advisor and soon developed an interest in "dragon bones". It was he who, in 1918, discovered the sites around Zhoukoudian, a village about 50 kilometers southwest of Beijing. However, because of the sparse nature of the initial finds, the site was abandoned. Work did not resume until 1921, when the Austrian paleontologist, Otto Zdansky, fresh with his doctoral degree from Vienna, came to Beijing to work for Andersson. Zdansky conducted short-term excavations at Locality 1 in 1921 and 1923, and recovered only two teeth of significance (one premolar and one molar) that he subsequently described, cautiously, as "?Homo sp." (Zdansky, 1927). With that done, Zdansky returned to Austria and suspended all fieldwork.

News of the fossil hominin teeth delighted the scientific community in Beijing, and plans for developing a larger, more systematic project at Zhoukoudian were soon formulated. At the epicenter of excitement was Davidson Black, a Canadian-born anatomist working at Peking Union Medical College. Black shared Andersson’s interest, as well as his view that central Asia was a promising home for early humankind. In late 1926, Black submitted a proposal to the Rockefeller Foundation seeking financial support for systematic excavation at Zhoukoudian and the establishment of an institute for the study of human biology in China. The Zhoukoudian Project came into existence in the spring of 1927, and two years later, the Cenozoic Research Laboratory of the Geological Survey of China was formally established. Being the first institution of its kind, the Cenozoic Laboratory opened up new avenues for the study of paleogeology and paleontology in China. The Laboratory was the precursor of the Institute of Vertebrate Paleontology and Paleoanthropology (IVPP) of the Chinese Academy of Science, which took its modern form after 1949.

The first of the major project finds are attributed to the young Swedish paleontologist, Anders Birger Bohlin, then serving as the field advisor at Zhoukoudian. He recovered a left lower molar that Black (1927) identified as unmistakably human (it compared favorably to the previous find made by Zdansky), and subsequently coined it Sinanthropus pekinensis. The news was at first met with skepticism, and many scholars had reservations that a single tooth was sufficient to justify the naming of a new type of early hominin. Yet within a little more than two years, in the winter of 1929, Pei Wenzhong, then the field director at Zhoukoudian, unearthed the first complete calvaria of Peking Man. Twenty-seven years after Schlosser’s initial description, the antiquity of early humans in East Asia was no longer a speculation, but a reality.

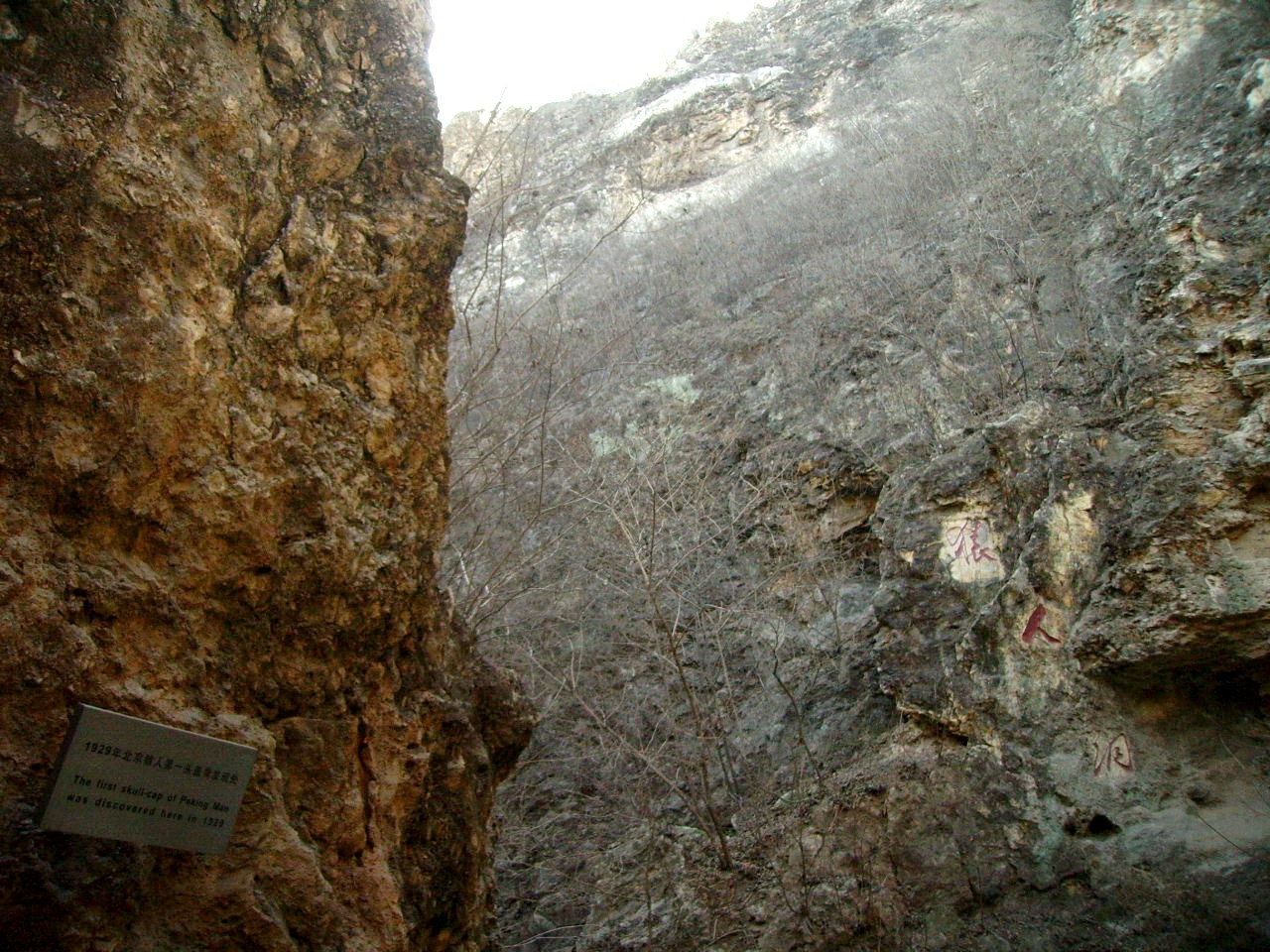
The Zhoukoudian site

Excavations continued at the site and remained fruitful until the outbreak of the Second Sino-Japanese War in 1937. The decade-long research yielded a wealth of faunal and lithic materials, as well as hominin fossils. These included 5 more complete calvaria, 9 large cranial fragments, 6 facial fragments, 14 partial mandibles, 147 isolated teeth, and 11 postcranial elements—estimated to represent as least 40 individuals. Evidence of fire, marked by ash lenses and burned bones and stones, were apparently also present, although recent studies have challenged this view. Franz Weidenreich came to Beijing soon after Black’s untimely death in 1934, and took charge of the study of the hominin specimens.

Following the loss of the Peking Man materials in late 1941, scientific endeavors at Zhoukoudian slowed, primarily because of lack of funding. Frantic search for the missing fossils took place, and continued well into the 1950s. After the establishment of the People’s Republic of China in 1949, excavations resumed at Zhoukoudian. But with political instability and social unrest brewing in China, beginning in 1966, and major discoveries at Olduvai Gorge and East Turkana (Koobi Fora), the paleoanthropological spotlight shifted westward to East Africa. Although China re-opened its doors to the West in the late 1970s, national policy calling for self-reliance, coupled with a widened language barrier, thwarted all the possibilities of renewed scientific relationships. Indeed, Harvard anthropologist K. C. Chang noted, "international collaboration (in developing nations very often a disguise for Western domination) became a thing of the past" (1977: 139).

=== Africa ===
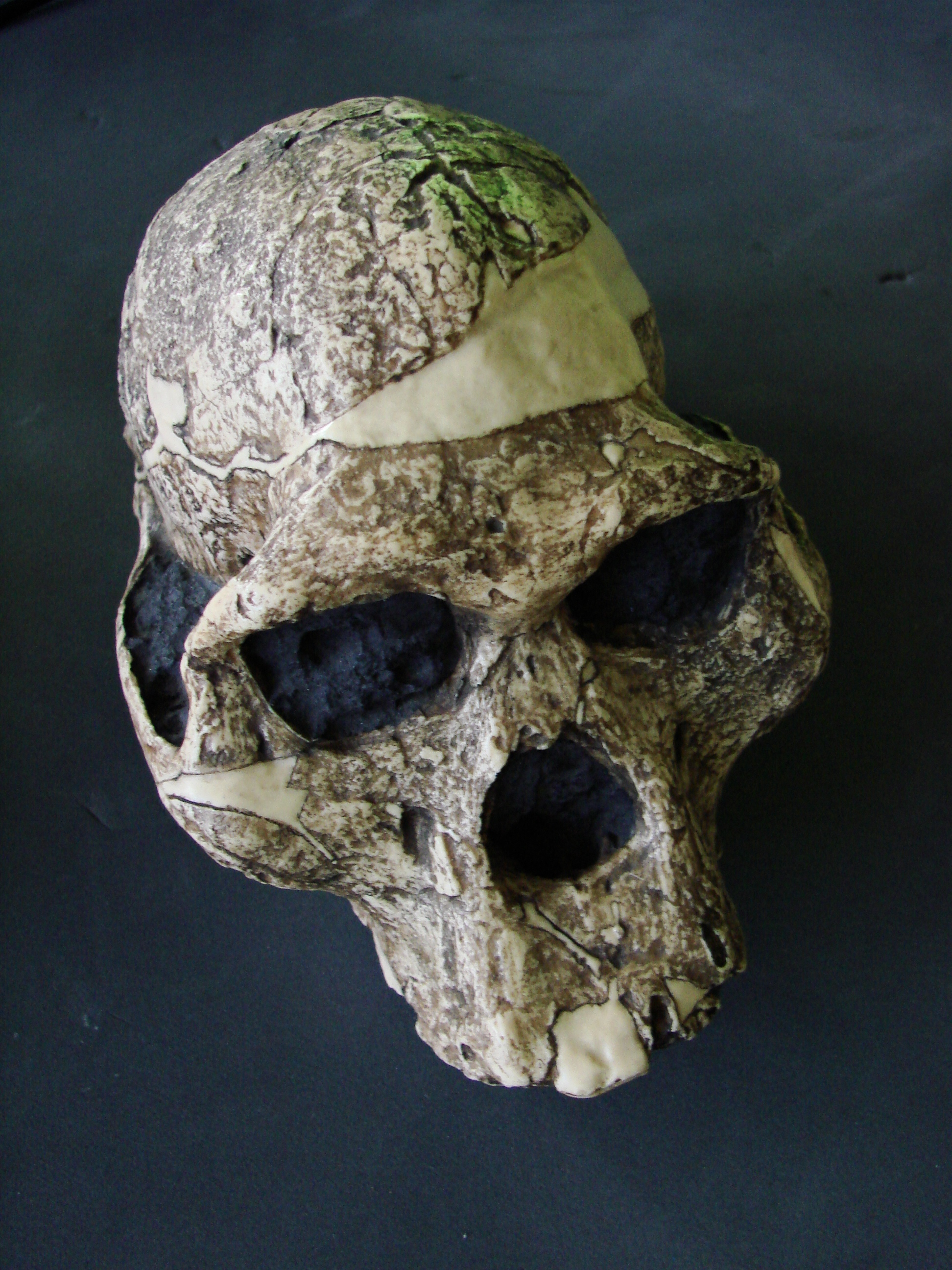
Skull of Australopithecus africanus

==== 1920s – 1940s ====
The first paleoanthropological find made in Africa was the 1921 discovery of the Kabwe 1 skull at Kabwe (Broken Hill), Zambia. Initially, this specimen was named Homo rhodesiensis; however, today it is considered part of the species Homo heidelbergensis.

In 1924 in a limestone quarry at Taung, Professor Raymond Dart discovered a remarkably well-preserved juvenile specimen (face and brain endocast), which he named Australopithecus africanus (Australopithecus meaning "Southern Ape"). Although the brain was small (410 cm^{3}), its shape was rounded, unlike the brain shape of chimpanzees and gorillas, and more like the shape seen in modern humans. In addition, the specimen exhibited short canine teeth, and the anterior placement of the foramen magnum was more like the placement seen in modern humans than the placement seen in chimpanzees and gorillas, suggesting that this species was bipedal.

All of these traits convinced Dart that the Taung child was a bipedal human ancestor, a transitional form between ape and human. However, Dart's conclusions were largely ignored for decades, as the prevailing view of the time was that a large brain evolved before bipedality. It took the discovery of additional australopith fossils in Africa that resembled his specimen, and the rejection of the Piltdown Man hoax, for Dart's claims to be taken seriously.

In the 1930s, paleontologist Robert Broom discovered and described a new species at Kromdraai, South Africa. Although similar in some ways to Dart's Australopithecus africanus, Broom's specimen had much larger cheek teeth. Because of this difference, Broom named his specimen Paranthropus robustus, using a new genus name. In doing so, he established the practice of grouping gracile australopiths in the genus Australopithecus and robust australopiths in the genus Paranthropus. During the 1960s, the robust variety was commonly moved into Australopithecus. A more recent consensus has been to return to the original classification of Paranthropus as a separate genus.

==== 1950s – 1990s ====
The second half of the twentieth century saw a significant increase in the number of paleoanthropological finds made in Africa. Many of these finds were associated with the work of the Leakey family in eastern Africa. In 1959, Mary Leakey's discovery of the Zinj fossin (OH 5) at Olduvai Gorge, Tanzania, led to the identification of a new species, Paranthropus boisei. In 1960, the Leakeys discovered the fossil OH 7, also at Olduvai Gorge, and assigned it to a new species, Homo habilis. In 1972, Bernard Ngeneo, a fieldworker working for Richard Leakey, discovered the fossil KNM-ER 1470 near Lake Turkana in Kenya. KNM-ER 1470 has been interpreted as either a distinct species, Homo rudolfensis, or alternatively as evidence of sexual dimorphism in Homo habilis. In 1967, Richard Leakey reported the earliest definitive examples of anatomically modern Homo sapiens from the site of Omo Kibish in Ethiopia, known as the Omo remains. In the late 1970s, Mary Leakey excavated the famous Laetoli footprints in Tanzania, which demonstrated the antiquity of bipedality in the human lineage. In 1985, Richard Leakey and Alan Walker discovered a specimen they called the Black Skull, found near Lake Turkana. This specimen was assigned to another species, Paranthropus aethiopicus. In 1994, a team led by Meave Leakey announced a new species, Australopithecus anamensis, based on specimens found near Lake Turkana.

Numerous other researchers have made important discoveries in eastern Africa. Possibly the most famous is the Lucy skeleton, discovered in 1973 by Donald Johanson and Maurice Taieb in Ethiopia's Afar Triangle at the site of Hadar. On the basis of this skeleton and subsequent discoveries, the researchers came up with a new species, Australopithecus afarensis. In 1975, Colin Groves and Vratislav Mazák announced a new species of human they called Homo ergaster. Homo ergaster specimens have been found at numerous sites in eastern and southern Africa. In 1994, Tim D. White announced a new species, Ardipithecus ramidus, based on fossils from Ethiopia.

In 1999, two new species were announced. Berhane Asfaw and Tim D. White named Australopithecus garhi based on specimens discovered in Ethiopia's Awash valley. Meave Leakey announced a new species, Kenyanthropus platyops, based on the cranium KNM-WT 40000 from Lake Turkana.

==== 21st century ====
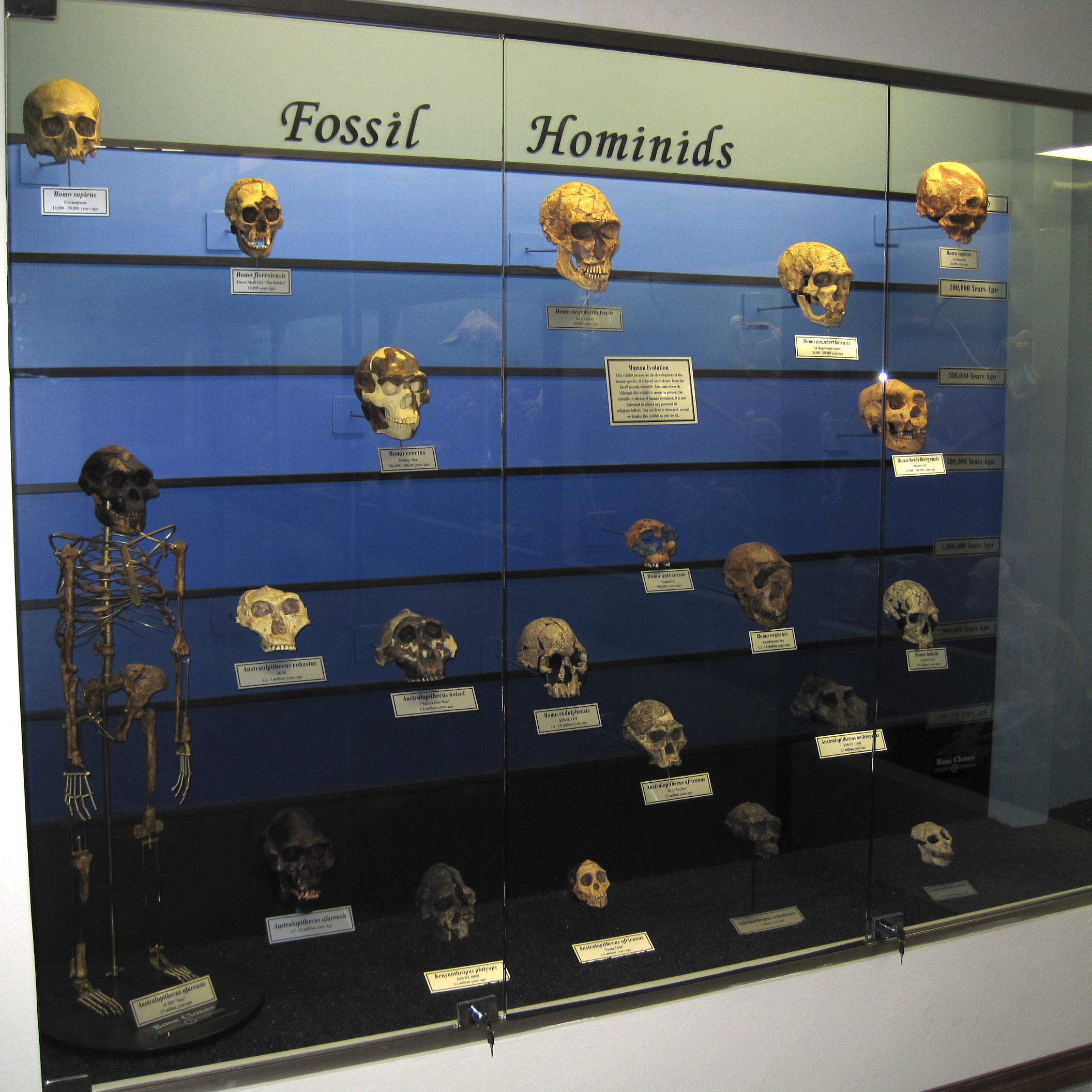
Fossil hominid skull display at The Museum of Osteology in Oklahoma City, USA

In the 21st century, numerous fossils have been found that add to current knowledge of existing species. For example, in 2001, Zeresenay Alemseged discovered an Australopithecus afarensis child fossil, called Selam, from the site of Dikika in the Afar region of Ethiopia. This find is particularly important because the fossil included a preserved hyoid bone, something rarely found in other paleoanthropological fossils but important for understanding the evolution of speech capacities.

Two new species from southern Africa have been discovered and described in recent years. In 2008, a team led by Lee Berger announced a new species, Australopithecus sediba, based on fossils they had discovered in Malapa cave in South Africa. In 2015, a team also led by Lee Berger announced another species, Homo naledi, based on fossils representing 15 individuals from the Rising Star Cave system in South Africa.

New species have also been found in eastern Africa. In 2000, Brigitte Senut and Martin Pickford described the species Orrorin tugenensis, based on fossils they found in Kenya. In 2004, Yohannes Haile-Selassie announced that some specimens previously labeled as Ardipithecus ramidus made up a different species, Ardipithecus kadabba. In 2015, Haile-Selassie announced another new species, Australopithecus deyiremeda, though some scholars are skeptical that the associated fossils truly represent a unique species.

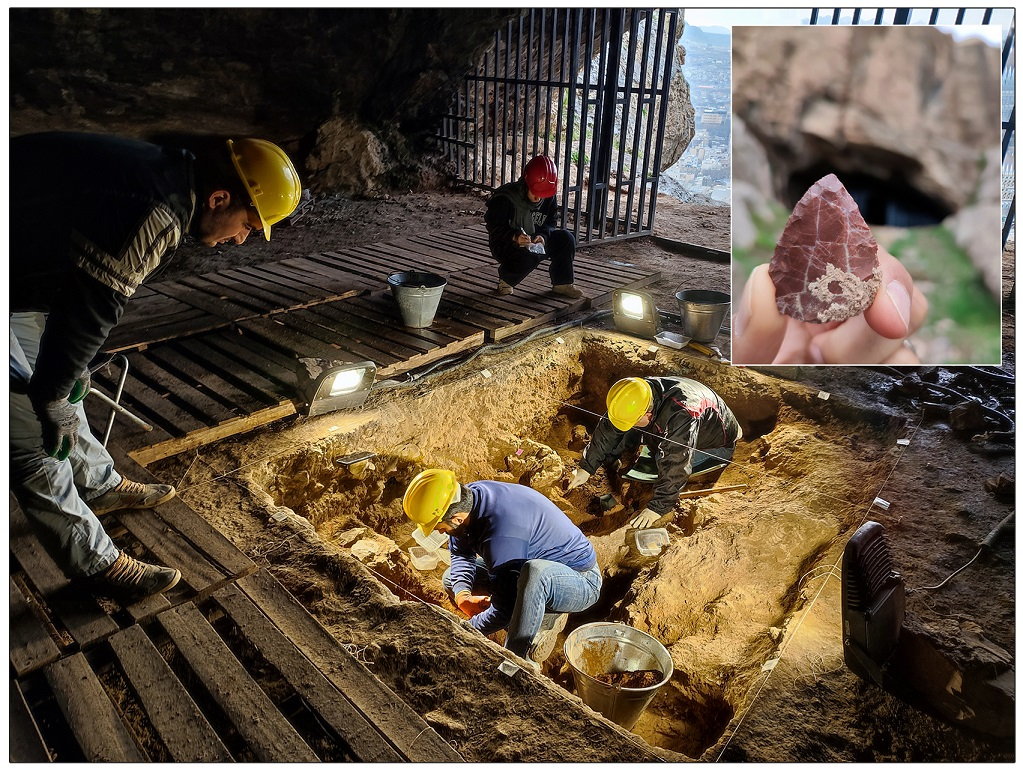
Archaeological excavations in the Middle Paleolithic cave site of the Ghamari Cave in Zagros Mountains

Although most hominin fossils from Africa have been found in eastern and southern Africa, there are a few exceptions. One is Sahelanthropus tchadensis, discovered in the central African country of Chad in 2002. This find is important because it widens the assumed geographic range of early hominins.

== Renowned paleoanthropologists ==
- Robert Ardrey (1908–1980)
- Lee Berger (1965–)
- Davidson Black (1884–1934)
- Robert Broom (1866–1951)
- Michel Brunet (1940–)
- J. Desmond Clark (1916–2002)
- Carleton S. Coon (1904–1981)
- Raymond Dart (1893–1988)
- Eugene Dubois (1858–1940)
- Johann Carl Fuhlrott (1803–1877)
- Yohannes Haile-Selassie (1961–)
- Sonia Harmand (1974–)
- John D. Hawks
- Aleš Hrdlička (1869–1943)
- Glynn Isaac (1937–1985)
- Donald C. Johanson (1943–)
- Kamoya Kimeu (1938–2022)
- Jeffrey Laitman (1951–)
- Louis Leakey (1903–1972)
- Meave Leakey (1942–)
- Mary Leakey (1913–1996)
- Richard Leakey (1944–2022)
- André Leroi-Gourhan (1911–1986)
- Peter Wilhelm Lund (1801–1880)
- Kenneth Oakley (1911–1981)
- David Pilbeam (1940–)
- Gustav Heinrich Ralph von Koenigswald (1902–1982)
- John T. Robinson (1923–2001)
- Jeffrey H. Schwartz (1948–)
- Chris Stringer (1947–)
- Ian Tattersall (1945–)
- Pierre Teilhard de Chardin (1881–1955)
- Phillip V. Tobias (1925–2012)
- Erik Trinkaus (1948–)
- Alan Walker (1938–2017)
- Franz Weidenreich (1873–1948)
- Tim D. White (1950–)
- Milford H. Wolpoff (1942–)
- Bernard Wood (1945–)

== See also ==
- Dawn of Humanity (2015 PBS film)
- Dental anthropology
- Human evolution
- The Incredible Human Journey—Television documentary film series
- List of human evolution fossils
- Timeline of human evolution
