= Timothy Bromage =

American paleoanthropologist

Timothy G. Bromage
- Timothy G. Bromage
- Born: January 2, 1954 (age 72)
- Education: University of Toronto; California State University, Sonoma
- Known for: Hominid Corridor Research Project; Havers–Halberg Oscillation; palaeometabolomics; 2010 Max Planck Research Award
- Awards: Max Planck Research Award (2010); Fellow of the American Association for the Advancement of Science (2015)
- Scientific career
- Fields: Paleoanthropology, mineralized tissue biology, chronobiology, palaeometabolomics
- Workplaces: New York University College of Dentistry
- Website: dental.nyu.edu/faculty/ft/tgb3.html

Timothy George Bromage is an American paleoanthropologist and professor of molecular pathobiology at the New York University College of Dentistry. He directs the Hard Tissue Research Unit and co-leads the long-running Hominid Corridor Research Project in Malawi with Friedemann Schrenk. His research focuses on mineralized tissue biology, chronobiology, life-history reconstruction from bone and tooth microstructure, and palaeometabolomics.

== Early life and education ==
Bromage earned a B.A. in anthropology, biology, and geology from California State University, Sonoma in 1978. He received an M.A. (1980) and Ph.D. (1986) in biological anthropology from the University of Toronto.

== Career ==
Bromage held postdoctoral positions at University College London and the Royal Veterinary College, London (NATO Postdoctoral Fellow, 1987). He was appointed a postdoctoral research fellow at the London Hospital Medical College (1988). In 1989 he joined the Department of Anthropology at Hunter College, City University of New York, where he established the Hard Tissue Research Unit. In 2004 he moved the unit to the New York University College of Dentistry, where he established his full professorship in the Department of Molecular Pathobiology.

== Research ==
Bromage has made significant contributions to paleoanthropology through his work on mineralized tissue biology and chronobiology. His research has focused on reconstructing life history parameters-such as growth rates, maturation, and body size-from the incremental microstructures in fossil bones and teeth.

A landmark 1985 study co-authored with M. Christopher Dean and published in Nature re-evaluated the age at death of immature fossil hominids by counting daily incremental lines in dental enamel. The work showed that early hominins had faster ape-like dental developmental rates previously estimated as modern humans, providing a more accurate histological method for determining chronological age in the fossil record.

Bromage later identified a longer-period biorhythm in hard tissues, which he termed the Havers–Halberg Oscillation (HHO). In a 2009 paper published in Calcified Tissue International, he proposed that lamellar bone is an incremental tissue that reconciles enamel rhythms, body size, and organismal life history, with the HHO acting as a central metabolic clock influencing tissue and organ masses across the primate life-history continuum.

Bromage co-leads the Hominid Corridor Research Project in Malawi's Chiwondo Beds since 1983. Key discoveries include the 2.4-million-year-old UR 501 mandible (one of the oldest known specimens of the genus Homo, attributed to Homo rudolfensis) recovered in 1991 at Uraha, and the ca. 2.5-million-year-old Paranthropus boisei tooth MR 1106 (evidence of temporal and geographic overlap between early Homo and Paranthropus).

=== Palaeometabolomics ===
In 2025, Bromage led an international team that published the first extraction and analysis of genuine palaeometabolomes-metabolites preserved in fossilized mammalian hard tissues-from Plio-Pleistocene fossils (approximately 1.3–3 million years old) from early human sites. The study, published in Nature, examined bone and dentine fragments from rodents, an antelope, a pig, and an elephant recovered from Olduvai Gorge (Tanzania), the Chiwondo Beds (Malawi), and Makapansgat (South Africa).

Using mass spectrometry on small bone fragments, the team identified thousands of metabolites that provided insights into physiology, health, diet, palaeoecology and disease (for example, evidence of the parasite causing sleeping sickness in a 1.8-million-year-old ground squirrel). The work establishes palaeometabolomics as a new tool for studying ancient health, diet, disease, and environments at fossil sites.

== Awards and honors ==
- 2010 Max Planck Research Award (Life Sciences – Human Evolution), awarded jointly by the Max Planck Society and Alexander von Humboldt Foundation.
- 2015 Elected Fellow of the American Association for the Advancement of Science (AAAS).

== Selected publications ==
- Bromage, T.G. & Dean, M.C. (1985). Re-evaluation of the age at death of immature fossil hominids. Nature, 317, 525–527.
- Bromage, T.G. et al. (2009). Lamellar bone is an incremental tissue reconciling enamel rhythms, body size, and organismal life history. Calcified Tissue International, 84(5), 388–404.
- Schrenk, F. et al. (1993). Oldest Homo and Pliocene biogeography of the Malawi Rift. Nature, 365, 833–836.
- Bromage, T.G. et al. (2026). Palaeometabolomes yield biological and ecological profiles at early human sites. Nature, 649, 1197–1205.
