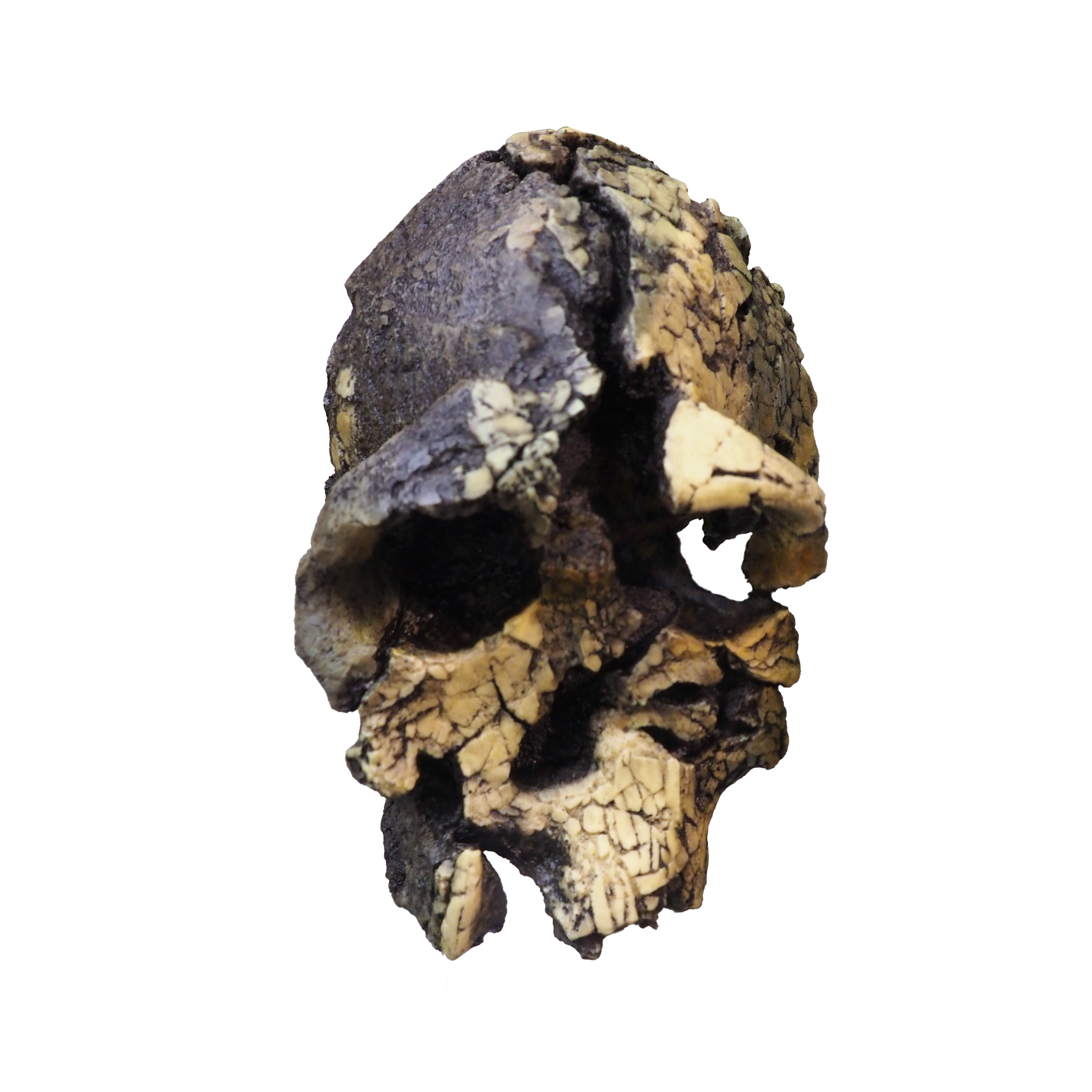
- Cast of KNM-WT 40000 at the Cantonal Museum of Geology, Lausanne

Scientific classification
- Kingdom: Animalia
- Phylum: Chordata
- Class: Mammalia
- Infraclass: Placentalia
- Order: Primates
- Superfamily: Hominoidea
- Family: Hominidae
- Tribe: Hominini
- Genus: †Kenyanthropus; Leakey et al., 2001

Type species
- †Kenyanthropus platyops Leakey et al., 2001

Other species
- †K.? rudolfensis (Cameron, 2003)

Synonyms
- Homo rudolfensis? (Alekseyev, 1986)

= Kenyanthropus =

Kenyanthropus Temporal range: Middle Pliocene, 3.3–3.2 Ma Possible Middle and Late Pleistocene records

Oldest-known tool-making hominin

Kenyanthropus ('man from Kenya') is a genus of extinct hominin identified from the Lomekwi site by Lake Turkana, Kenya, dated to 3.3 to 3.2 million years ago during the Middle Pliocene. It contains one species, K. platyops, but may also include the two-million-year-old Homo rudolfensis, or K. rudolfensis. Before its naming in 2001, Australopithecus afarensis was widely regarded as the only australopithecine to exist during the Middle Pliocene, but Kenyanthropus evinces a greater diversity than once acknowledged. Kenyanthropus is most recognisable by an unusually flat face and small teeth for such an early hominin, with values on the extremes or beyond the range of variation for australopithecines in regard to these features. Multiple australopithecine species may have coexisted by foraging for different food items (niche partitioning), which may be the reason why these apes anatomically differ in features related to chewing.

The Lomekwi site also yielded the earliest stone tool industry, the Lomekwian, characterised by the rudimentary production of simple flakes by pounding a core against an anvil or with a hammerstone. It may have been manufactured by Kenyanthropus, but it is unclear if multiple species were present at the site or not. The knappers were using volcanic rocks collected no more than 100 m (330 ft) from the site. Kenyanthropus seems to have lived on a lakeside or floodplain environment featuring forests and grasslands.

== Taxonomy ==
=== Discovery ===
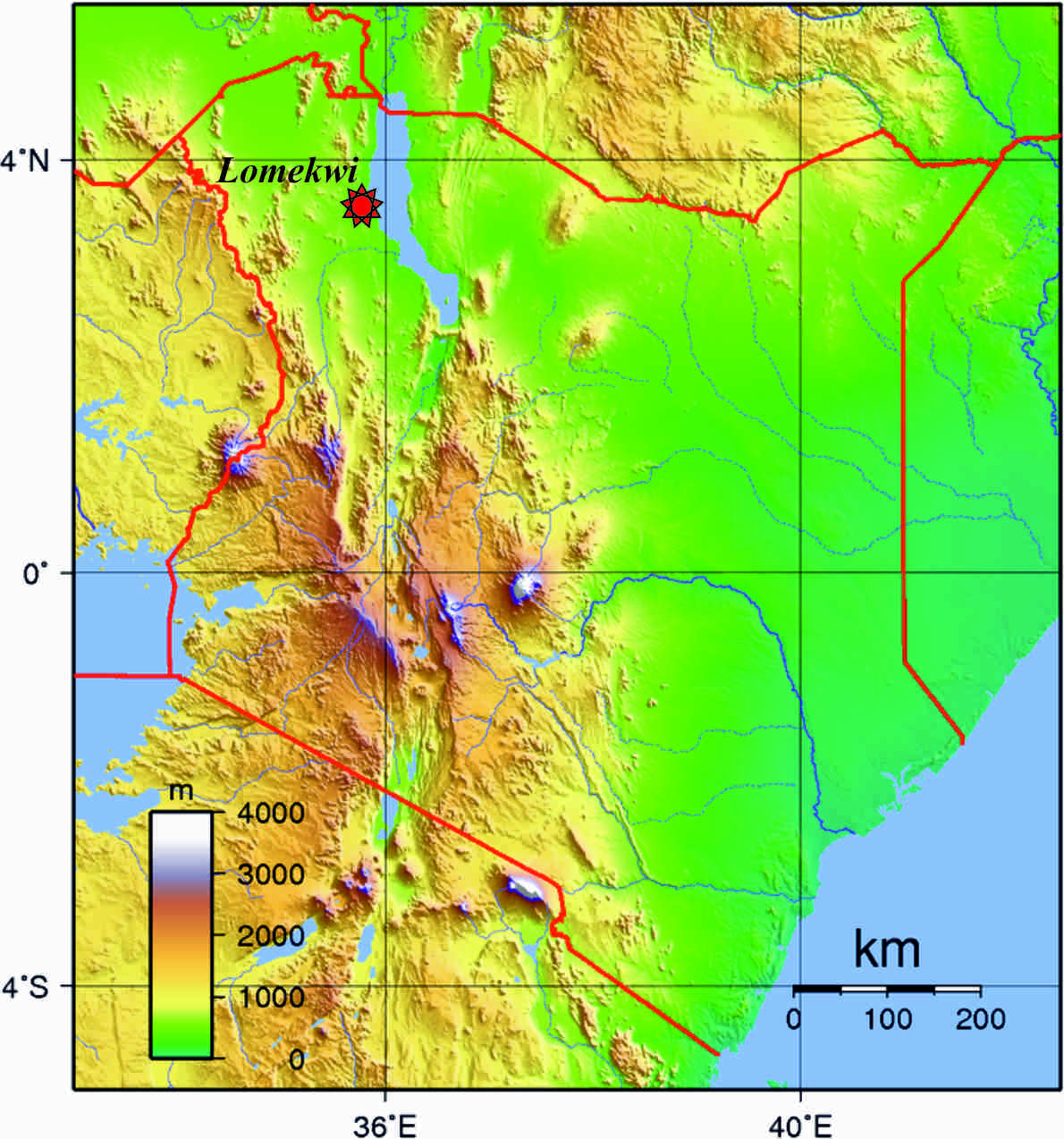
Location of Lomekwi, on the western shore of Lake Turkana, Kenya

In August 1998, field technician Blasto Onyango discovered a hominin partial left maxilla (upper jaw), specimen KNM-WT 38350, on the Kenyan Lomekwi dig site by Lake Turkana, overseen by prominent paleoanthropologists Louise and Meave Leakey. In August 1999 at the Lomekwi site, research assistant Justus Erus discovered an uncharacteristically flat-faced australopithecine skull, specimen KNM-WT 40000. The 1998–1999 field season subsequently uncovered 34 more craniodental hominin specimens, but the research team was unable to determine if these can be placed into the same species as the former two specimens (that is, if multiple species were present at the site).

=== Age ===
The specimens were recovered near the Nabetili tributary of the Lomekwi river in a mudstone layer of the Nachukui Formation. KNM-WT 40000 was recovered from the Kataboi Member, 8 m (26 ft) below the 3.4-million-year-old Tulu Bor Tuff, and 12 m (39 ft) above the 3.57-million-year-old Lokochot Tuff. By linear interpolation, KNM-WT 40000 is approximately 3.5 million years old, dating back to the Middle Pliocene. Only three more specimens were recovered from the Kataboi Member at around the same level, the deepest KNM-WT 38341 probably sitting on 3.53-million-year-old sediments. KNM-WT 38350 was recovered from the Lomekwi Member 17 m (56 ft) above Tulu Bor, and is approximately 3.3 million years old. The other specimens from this member sit 16 to 24 m (52 to 79 ft) above Tulu Bor, roughly 3.3 million years old as well. The highest specimens—KNM-WT 38344, -55 and -56—may be around 3.2 million years old.

=== Classification ===
In 2001, Meave Leakey and colleagues assigned the Lomekwi remains to a new genus and species, Kenyanthropus platyops, with KNM-WT 40000 the holotype, and KNM-WT 38350 a paratype. The genus name honours Kenya where Lomekwi and a slew of other major human-ancestor sites have been identified. The species name derives from Ancient Greek platus "flat" and opsis "face" in reference to the unusually flat face for such an early hominin.

The classification of early hominins with their widely varying anatomy has been a difficult subject matter. The 20th century generated an overabundance of hominin genera plunging the field into taxonomic turmoil, until German evolutionary biologist Ernst Mayr, surveying a "bewildering diversity of names", decided to recognise only a single genus, Homo, containing a few species. Though other genera and species have since become popular, his more conservative view of hominin diversity has become the mainstay, and the acceptance of further genera is usually met with great resistance. Since Mayr, hominins are classified into Australopithecus which gave rise to Homo (which includes modern humans) and the robust Paranthropus (which is sometimes not recognised as its own genus), which by definition leaves Australopithecus polyphyletic (a non-natural group which does not comprise a common ancestor and all of its descendants). In addition to Kenyanthropus, the 1990s saw the introduction of A. bahrelghazali, Ardipithecus, Orrorin and Sahelanthropus, which has complicated discussions of hominin diversity, though the latter three have not been met with much resistance on account of their greater age (all predating Australopithecus).

At the time Kenyanthropus was discovered, Australopithecus afarensis was the only recognised australopithecine to have existed between 4 and 3 million years ago, aside from its probable ancestor A. anamensis, making A. afarensis the likely progenitor of all other australopithecines as they diversified in the late Pliocene and into the Pleistocene. Leakey and colleagues considered Kenyanthropus to be evidence of a greater diversity of Pliocene australopithecines than previously acknowledged. In 2015, Ethiopian palaeoanthropologist Yohannes Haile-Selassie and colleagues erected a new species, A. deyiremeda, which lived in the same time and region as Kenyanthropus and A. afarensis.

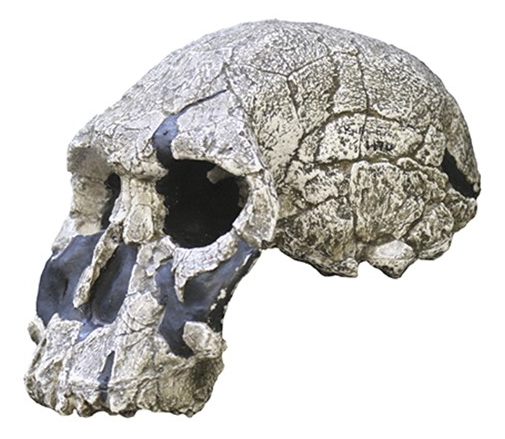
Reconstruction of H. rudolfensis KNM-ER 1470, which resembles Kenyanthropus KNM-WT 40000

Meave Leakey and colleagues drew attention to namely the flat face and small cheek teeth, in addition to several other traits, to distinguish the genus from earlier Ardipithecus, contemporary and later Australopithecus, and later Paranthropus. Kenyanthropus lacks any of the derived traits seen in Homo. They conceded Kenyanthropus could be subsumed into Australopithecus if the widest definition of the latter is used, but this conservative approach to hominin diversity leaves Australopithecus a grade taxon, a non-natural grouping of similar-looking species whereby it effectively encompasses all hominins not classifiable into Ardipithecus or Homo regardless of how they may be related to each other. Leakey and colleagues further drew parallels with KNM-WT 40000 and the two-million-year-old KNM-ER 1470 assigned to Homo rudolfensis, attributing differences in braincase and nasal anatomy to archaicness. They suggested H. rudolfensis may be better classified as K. rudolfensis.

- - - K. platyops
    - "K." rudolfensis (formerly Homo rudolfensis)
  - - H. habilis
    - - H. ergaster
      - - H. erectus
        - - H. antecessor
          - H. heidelbergensis
          - - H. neanderthalensis
            - H. sapiens

In 2003, American palaeoanthropologist Tim D. White was concerned that KNM-WT 40000 was far too distorted to obtain any accurate metrics for classification purposes, especially because the skull was splintered into over 1,100 pieces often measuring less than 1 cm (0.39 in) across. Because such damage is rarely even seen, he argues that it cannot be reliably reconstructed. Because the skulls of modern ape species vary widely, he suggested further fossil discoveries in the region may prove the Lomekwi hominins to be a local variant of A. afarensis rather than a distinct genus or species. In response, anthropologist Fred Spoor and Meave and Louise Leakey produced much more detailed digital topographical scans of the KNM-WT 40000 maxilla in 2010, permitting the comparison of many more anatomical landmarks on the maxillae of all other early hominins, modern humans, chimpanzees and gorillas, in order to more accurately correct the distortion. The new reconstruction more convincingly verifies the distinctness of Kenyanthropus.

In 2003, Spanish writer Camilo José Cela Conde and evolutionary biologist Francisco J. Ayala proposed resurrecting the genus "Praeanthropus" to house all australopithecines which are not Ardipithecus, Paranthropus, or A. africanus, though they opted to synonymise Kenyanthropus with Homo as "H. platyops". Their recommendations have been largely rejected.

African Hominin timeline

== Anatomy ==
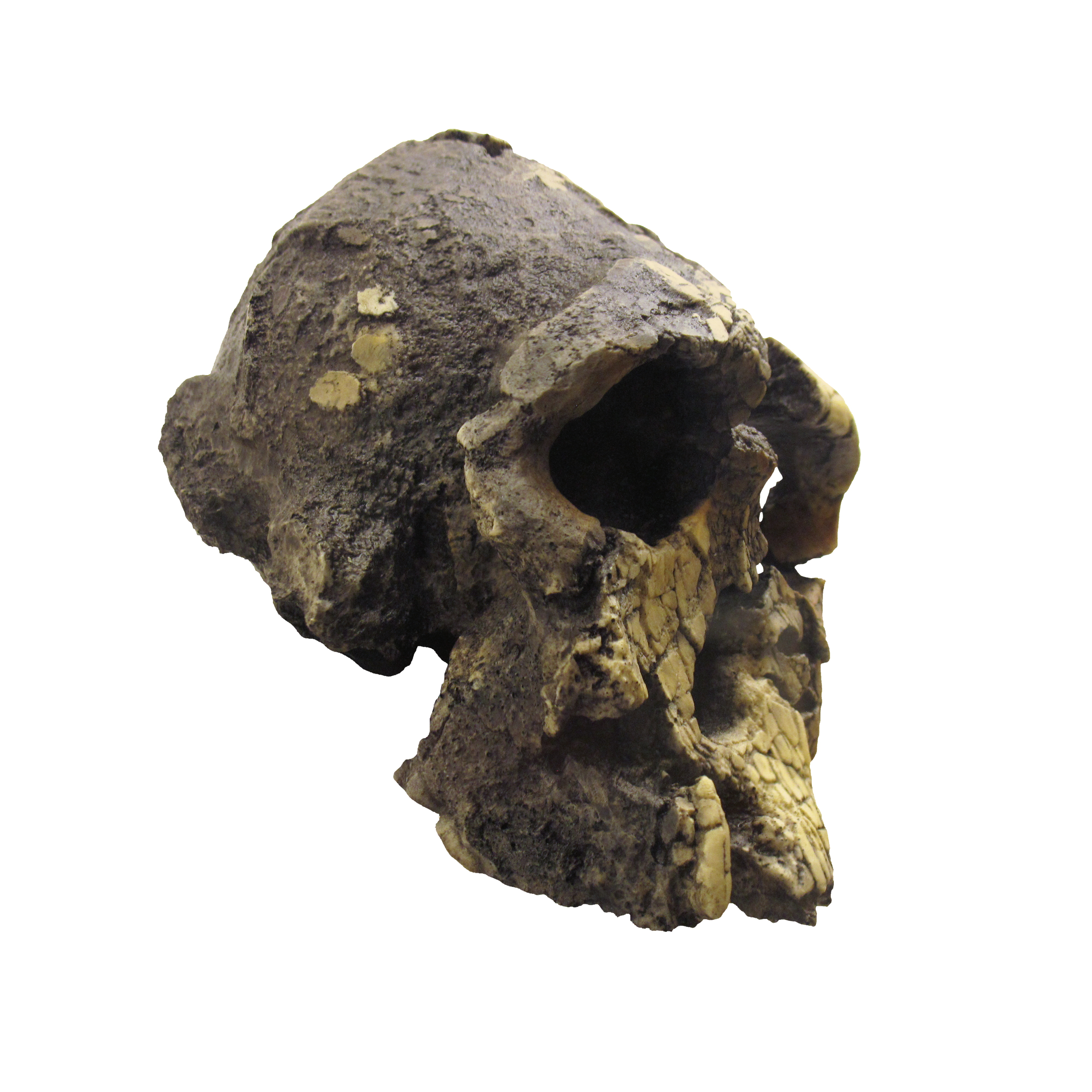
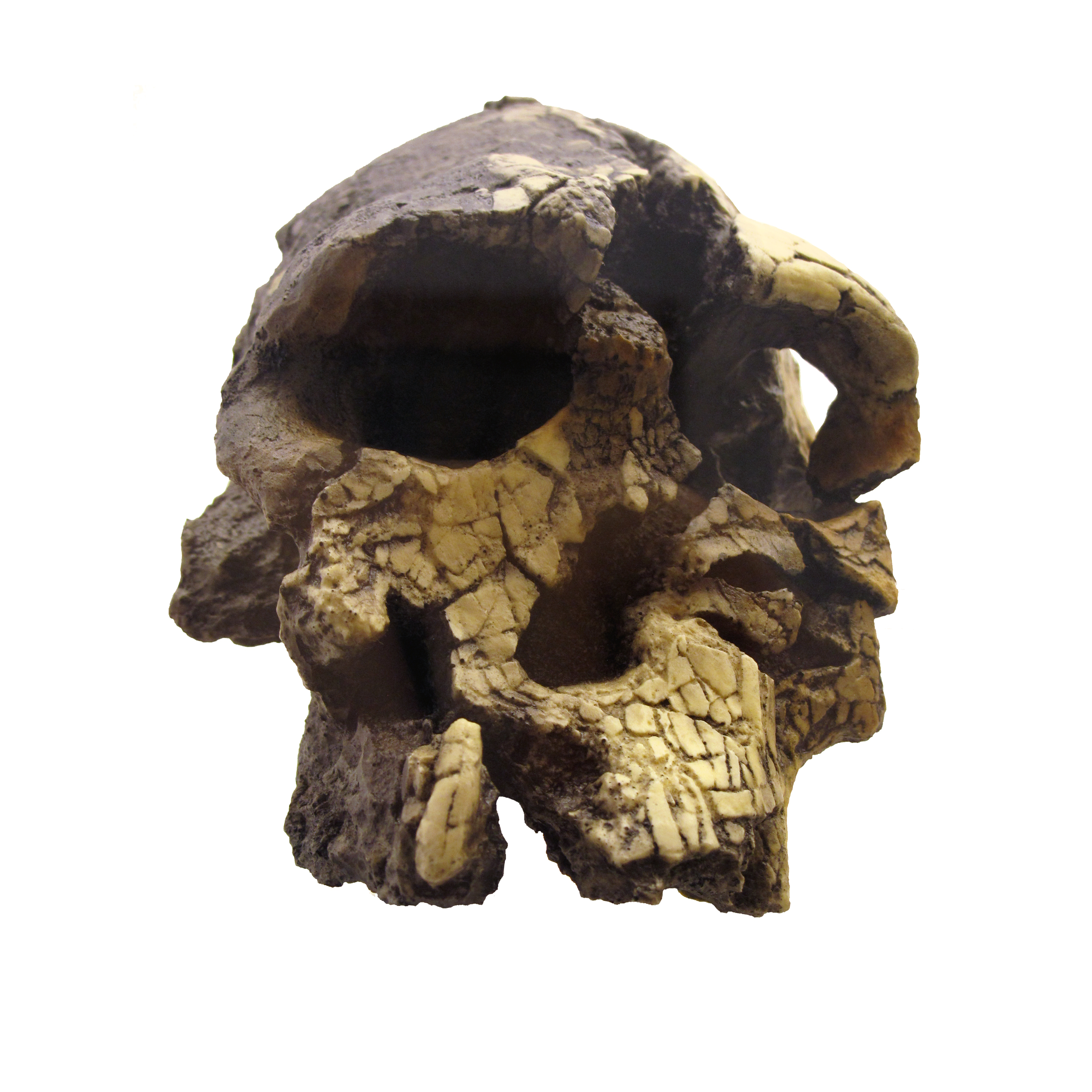
KNM-WT 40000 from different angles

KNM-WT 40000 has been heavily distorted during the fossilisation process, the braincase shifted downwards and backwards, the nasal region to the right, and the mouth and cheek region forward. It is unclear if the specimen represents a male or a female.

Kenyanthropus has a relatively flat face, including subnasally, between the nose and the mouth (the nasoalveolar clivus). The clivus inclines at 45° (there is relaxed sub-nasal prognathism), steeper than almost all other australopithecine specimens (on the upper end of variation for Paranthropus), more comparable to H. rudolfensis and H. habilis. This is the earliest example of a flat face in the hominin fossil record. Unlike A. afarensis, Kenyanthropus lacks the anterior pillars, bony columns running down from the nasal aperture (nose hole). It is also one of the longest early hominin clivi discovered at 32 mm (1.3 in). The nasal aperture (nose hole) is narrow compared to that of Australopithecus and Paranthropus. The cheekbones are tall and steep, and the anterior surface (where the cheeks juts out the most) is positioned above the premolars, more frequently seen in Paranthropus than other hominins. The zygomaticoalveolar crest (stretching between the cheek and the teeth) is low and curved. Overall, the face resembles H. rudolfensis, though has longer nasal bones, a narrower nasal aperture, a shorter postcanine (the molars and premolars) tooth row, and a less steeply inclined (less flat, more prognathic) midfacial region. Much later Paranthropus are also characterised by relatively flat faces, but this is generally considered to be an adaptation to maximise bite force through enormous teeth, which Kenyanthropus enigmatically does not have.

Among all the specimens, only the M^{2} (2nd upper left molar) and the tooth sockets of the left side of the mouth of KNM-WT 40000 are preserved well enough to measure and study. With dimensions of 11.4 mm^{2} × 12.4 mm^{2} (0.0177 sq in × 0.0192 sq in), a surface area of 141.4 mm (5.57 in), it is the smallest M^{2} ever discovered for an early hominin. For comparison, those of A. afarensis in the comparative sample Leakey and colleagues used ranged from about 160 to 225 mm^{2} (0.248 to 0.349 sq in), H. habilis and H. rudolfensis 165 to 250 mm^{2} (0.256 to 0.388 sq in), and the robust P. boisei (with the largest molars among hominins) about 240 to 380 mm^{2} (0.37 to 0.59 sq in). The reconstructed dimensions of KNM-WT 38350's M^{1} are 10.5 mm × 12 mm (0.41 in × 0.47 in) for a surface area of 126 mm^{2} (0.195 sq in), which is on the lower end of variation for A. anamensis, A. afarensis and H. habilis. The thick molar enamel is on par with that of A. anamensis and A. afarensis. KNM-WT40000 retains the ancestral ape premolar tooth root morphology, with a single lingual root (on the tongue side) and two buccal roots (towards the cheeks), though the P^{4} of KNM-WT 38350 may only have a single buccal root; the ancestral pattern is frequent in Paranthropus and variable in Australopithecus. Individuals of more derived species typically have single-rooted premolars. The canine jugum is not visible (a line of bone in the maxilla corresponding to the canine tooth root), which may mean the canines were not that large. The cross-sectional area of the I^{2} (2nd upper incisor) is 90% the size of that of I^{1}, whereas it is usually 50 to 70% in other great apes. The tooth roots of the incisors do not appear to be orientated out (there was probably no alveolar prognathism, the front teeth did not jut forward).

Brain volume is uncalculable due to distortion of the braincase, but it was probably similar to that of Australopithecus and Paranthropus. A sample of five A. afarensis averaged 445 cc. Like Paranthropus, there is no frontal trigon (a triangle formed by the conjunction of the temporal lines behind the brow ridge). Unlike H. habilis but like H. rudolfensis, there is no sulcus (trench) behind the brow ridge. The degree of postorbital constriction, the narrowing of the braincase in the frontal lobe region, is on par with that of Australopithecus, H. rudolfensis and H. habilis, but less than P. boisei. Like the earlier A. anamensis and Ar. ramidus, the tympanic bone retains the ancestral hominin ear morphology, lacking the petrous crest, and bearing a narrow ear canal with a small opening. The foramen magnum, where the skull connects to the spine, was probably oval shaped as opposed to the heart-shaped one of P. boisei.

== Technology ==
In 2015, French archaeologist Sonia Harmand and colleagues identified the Lomekwian stone-tool industry at the Lomekwi site. The tools are attributed to Kenyanthropus as it is the only hominin identified at the site, but in 2015, anthropologist Fred Spoor suggested that at least some of the indeterminate specimens may be assignable to A. deyiremeda as the two species have somewhat similar maxillary anatomy. At 3.3 million years old, it is the oldest proposed industry. The assemblage comprises 83 cores, 35 flakes, 7 possible anvils, 7 possible hammerstones, 5 pebbles (which may have also been used as hammers), and 12 indeterminant fragments, of which 52 were sourced from basalt, 51 from phonolite, 35 from trachyphonolite (intermediate composition of phonolite and trachyte), 3 from vesicular basalt, 2 from trachyte, and 6 indeterminant. These materials could have originated at a conglomerate only 100 m (330 ft) from the site.

The cores are large and heavy, averaging 167 mm × 147.8 mm × 108.8 mm (6.57 in × 5.82 in × 4.28 in) and 3.1 kg (6.8 lb). Flakes ranged 19 to 205 mm (0.75 to 8.07 in) in length, normally shorter than later Oldowan industry flakes. Anvils were heavy, up to 15 kg (33 lb). Flakes seem to have been cleaved off primarily using the passive hammer technique (directly striking the core on the anvil) and/or the bipolar method (placing the core on the anvil and striking it with a hammerstone). They produced both unifaces (the flake was worked on one side) and bifaces (both sides were worked). Though they may have been shaping cores beforehand to make them easier to work, the knappers more often than not poorly executed the technique, producing incomplete fractures and fissures on several cores, or requiring multiple blows to flake off a piece. Harmand and colleagues suggested such rudimentary skills may place the Lomekwian as an intermediate industry between simple pounding techniques probably used by earlier hominins, and the flaking Oldowan industry developed by Homo.

It is typically assumed that early hominins were using stone tools to cut meat in addition to other organic materials. Wild chimpanzees and black-striped capuchins have been observed to make flakes by accident while using hammerstones to crack nuts on anvils, but the Lomekwi knappers were producing multiple flakes from the same core, and flipped over flakes to work the other side, which speak to the intentionality of their production. In 2016, Spanish archaeologists Manuel Domínguez-Rodrigo and Luis Alcalá argued Harmand and colleagues did not convincingly justify that the tools were discovered in situ, that is, the tools may be much younger and were reworked into an older layer. If the date of 3.3 million years is accepted, then there is a 700,000-year gap between the next solid evidence of stone tools, at Ledi-Geraru associated with the earliest Homo LD 350-1, the Oldowan industry, reported by American palaeoanthropologist David Braun and colleagues in 2019. This gap can either be interpreted as the loss and reinvention of stone tool technology, or preservation bias (that tools from this time gap either did not preserve for whatever reason, or sit undiscovered), the latter implying the Lomekwian evolved into the Oldowan.

== Palaeoecology ==
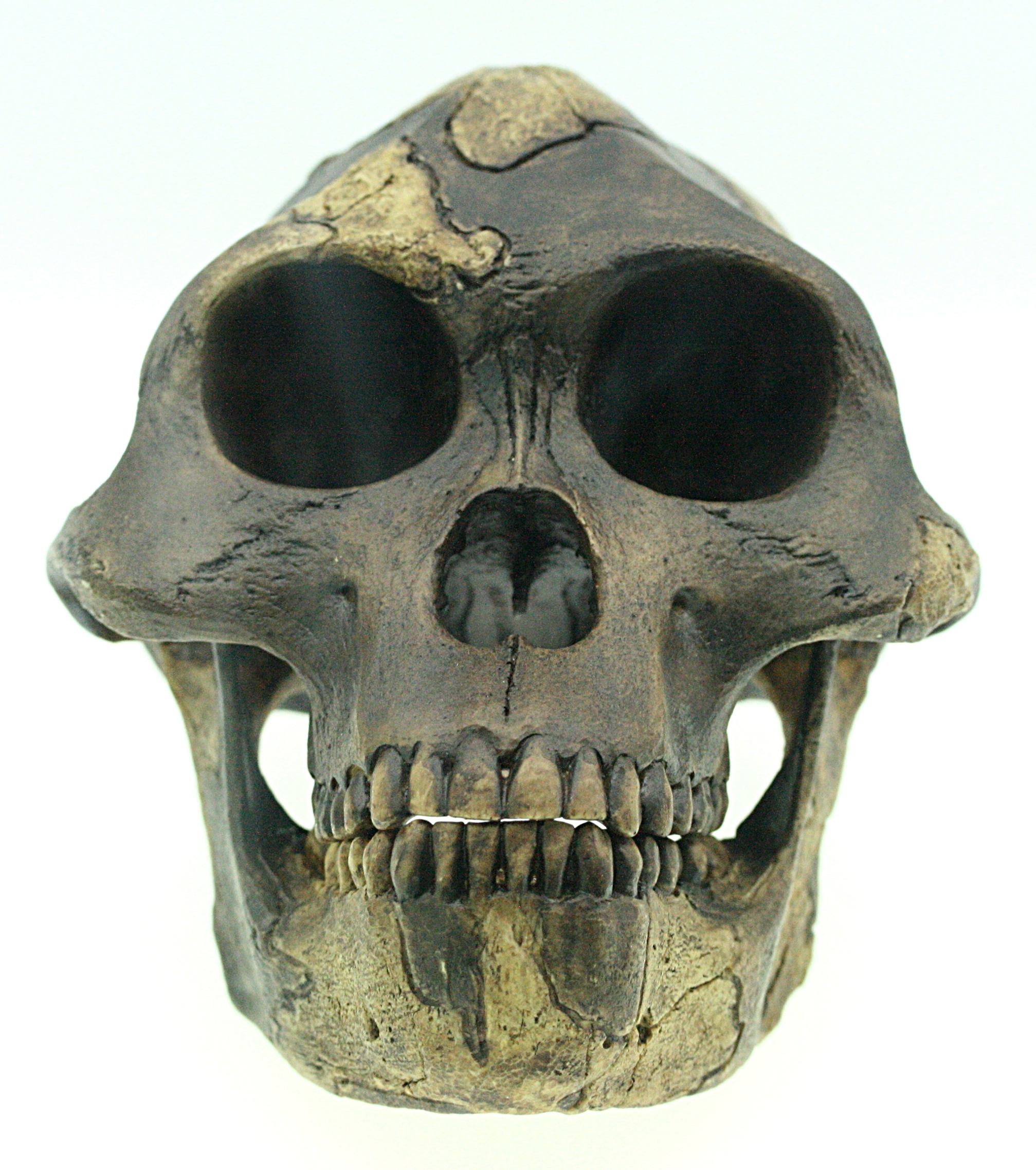
Kenyanthropus was contemporary with A. afarensis ("Lucy" above)

From 4.5 to 4 million years ago, Lake Turkana may have swelled to upwards of 28,000 km^{2} (11,000 sq mi), in comparison to today's 6,400 km^{2} (2,500 sq mi); the lake at what is now the Koobi Fora site possibly sat at minimum 36 m (118 ft) below the surface. Volcanic hills by Lomekwi pushed basalt into the lake sediments. The lake broke up and from 3.6 to 3.2 million years ago, the region was probably characterised by a series of much smaller lakes, each covering no more than 2,500 km^{2} (970 sq mi). Similarly, the bovid remains at Lomekwi are suggestive of a wet mosaic environment featuring both grasslands and forests on a lakeside or floodplain. Theropithecus brumpti is the most common monkey at the site as well as the rest of the Turkana Basin at this time; this species tends to live in more forested and closed environments. At the fossiliferous A. afarensis Hadar site in Ethiopia, Theropithecus darti is the most common monkey, which tends to prefer drier conditions conducive to wood- or grassland environments. Leakey and colleagues argued this distribution means Kenyanthropus was living in somewhat more forested environments than more northerly A. afarensis.

Kenyanthropus, A. afarensis and A. deyiremeda all coexisted in the same time and region, and, because their anatomy largely diverges in areas relevant to chewing, they may have practised niche partitioning and foraged for different food items.

== See also ==
- List of fossil sites
- List of human evolution fossils
