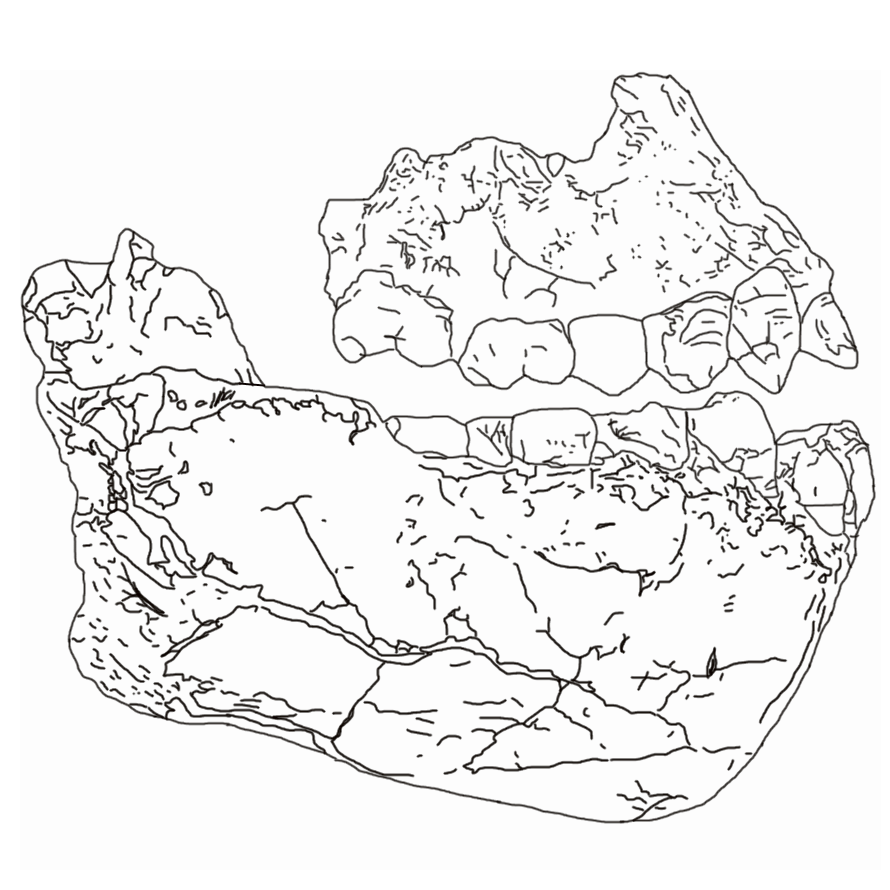
- Jaw reconstruction of A. deyiremeda. At the top, the holotype maxilla BRT-VP-3/1 (shown reversed), while at the bottom is the paratype mandible BRT-VP-3/14.

Scientific classification
- Kingdom: Animalia
- Phylum: Chordata
- Class: Mammalia
- Order: Primates
- Family: Hominidae
- Genus: †Australopithecus
- Species: †A. deyiremeda

Binomial name
- †Australopithecus deyiremeda Haile-Selassie et al., 2015

Synonyms
- Paranthropus deyiremeda Nygren, 2018

= Australopithecus deyiremeda =

Australopithecus deyiremeda Temporal range: Pliocene, 3.5–3.3 Ma

Proposed extinct species of hominin of Ethiopia from 3.5 to 3.3 mya

Australopithecus deyiremeda is an extinct species of australopithecine from Woranso–Mille, Afar Region, Ethiopia, about 3.5 to 3.3 million years ago during the Pliocene. Because it is known only from three partial jawbones, it is unclear if these specimens indeed represent a unique species or belong to the much better-known A. afarensis. A. deyiremeda is distinguished by its forward-facing cheek bones and small cheek teeth compared to those of other early hominins. It is unclear if a partial foot specimen exhibiting a dextrous big toe (a characteristic unknown in any australopithecine) can be assigned to A. deyiremeda. A. deyiremeda lived in a mosaic environment featuring both open grasslands and lake- or riverside forests, and anthropologist Fred Spoor suggests it may have been involved in the Kenyan Lomekwi stone-tool industry typically assigned to Kenyanthropus. A. deyiremeda coexisted with A. afarensis, and they may have exhibited niche partitioning to avoid competing with each other for the same resources, such as by relying on different fallback foods during leaner times.

== Taxonomy ==
Australopithecus deyiremeda was first proposed in 2015 by Ethiopian palaeoanthropologist Yohannes Haile-Selassie and colleagues based on jawbone fossils from the Burtele and Waytaleyta areas of Woranso–Mille, Afar Region, Ethiopia. The holotype specimen, a young adult left maxilla with all teeth except the first incisor and third molar BRT-VP-3/1, was discovered on 4 March 2011 by local resident Mohammed Barao. The paratype specimens are a complete adult body of the mandible with all incisors BRT-VP-3/14, and an adult right toothless jawbone WYT-VP-2/10, which were discovered by Ethiopian fossil hunter Ato Alemayehu Asfaw [es]. A right maxilla fragment with the fourth premolar BRT-VP-3/37 was found 5 m (16 ft) east of BRT-VP-3/14, and it is unclear if these belonged to the same individual. The sediments were radiometrically dated to 3.5–3.3 million years ago, the Middle Pliocene.

The describers believed the remains were distinct enough from the contemporary and well-known A. afarensis to warrant species distinction, and A. deyiremeda is counted among a growing diversity of Late Pliocene australopithecines alongside A. afarensis, A. bahrelghazali and Kenyanthropus platyops. The name deyiremeda derives from the Afar language meaning "close relative" because, existing so early in time, the discoverers considered A. deyiremeda to have been closely related to future australopiths. However, though the proposed distinguishing characteristics are apparently statistically significant, given how few specimens of A. deyiremeda exist, it is unclear if this indeed warrants species distinction or if these specimens simply add to the normal range of variation for A. afarensis. If it is a valid species, then it could possibly indicate some A. afarensis specimens are currently classified into the wrong species.

Haile-Selassie and colleagues noted that, though it shares many similarities with the robust Paranthropus, it may not have been closely related because it lacked enlarged molars which are characteristic of Paranthropus.

African Hominin timeline

== Anatomy ==
Despite being so early, the jaws of A. deyiremeda show some similarities to those of the later Homo and Paranthropus. The jaw jutted out somewhat (prognathism) at perhaps a 39-degree angle, similar to most other early hominins. The cheekbone is positioned more forward than most A. afarensis specimens. Unlike Australopithecus afarensis but like Paranthropus, the walls of the cheek teeth are inclined rather than coming straight up. The upper canines are proportionally smaller than those of other Australopithecus, but are otherwise morphologically similar to those of A. anamensis. The cheek teeth are quite small for an early hominin, and the first molar is the smallest reported for an adult Pliocene hominin. A. deyiremeda follows a typical Australopithecus pattern of postcanine tooth size proportions, with its second and third molars being significantly lager than its first molar. Nonetheless, the enamel was still thick as other early hominins, and the enamel on the second molar is quite high and more similar to P. robustus. The jawbone, though small, is robust and more similar to that of Paranthropus.

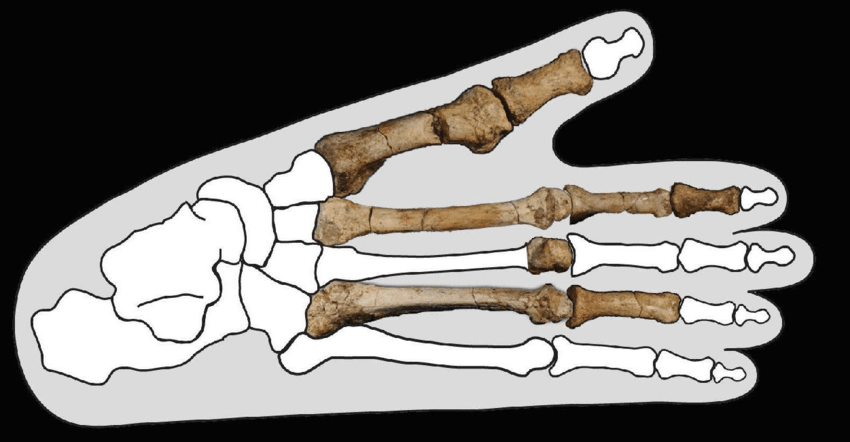
Reconstruction of BRT-VP-2/73

In 2012, a 3.4-million-year-old partial foot, BRT-VP-2/73, was recovered from Burtele (Woranso–Mille). It strongly diverges from contemporary and later hominins by having a dextrous big toe like the earlier Ardipithecus ramidus, and consequently has not been assigned to a species. Though more diagnostic facial elements have since been discovered in the area, they are not clearly associated with the foot. In 2025, Haile-Selassie and colleagues described new fossil material of A. deyiremeda that directly overlap with the holotype from the same stratigraphical unit where BRT-VP-2/73 was discovered, and suggested that BRT-VP-2/73 can also be confidently assigned to the same species. They reported that A. deyiremeda had a more primitive dental and postcranial morphology than A. afarensis, that its feet had greater ability for grasping than modern most fossil hominins, and that it had a diet dominated by C_{3} foods, similar to the earlier A. anamensis.

== Palaeoecology ==
A. deyiremeda features a strong jawbone and thick enamel, consistent with a diet of tough sedges and similar foods which australopiths are generally thought to have primarily subsisted upon. The enamel on the upper incisor, canine and first premolar exhibits hypoplasia, probably caused by a period of malnutrition or illness during enamel growth in infancy while the teeth were still growing. A. deyiremeda was likely a generalist feeder. A. deyiremeda and A. afarensis may have exhibited niche partitioning given they cohabited the same area. That is, given dental and chewing differences, they may have had different dietary and/or habitat preferences, unless these differences were simply a product of genetic drift. Much like chimpanzees and gorillas which have more or less the same diet and inhabit the same areas, A. deyiremeda and A. afarensis may have shared typical foods when in abundance, and resorted to different fallback foods in times of food scarcity.

The Lomekwi stone-tool industry from northern Kenya is loosely associated with the Middle Pliocene Kenyanthropus based on an upper jaw fragment assigned to Kenyanthropus based on forward cheekbones, three-rooted premolars, and a small first molar. Since these features are also exhibited in A. deyiremeda, anthropologist Fred Spoor suggested that A. deyiremeda was actually present at the site. Identified at 3.3 million years old, the Lomekwian is the earliest culture. These knappers flaked off pieces of cores made of basalt, phonolite and trachyphonolite. They held the core with one hand and struck it vertically with a hammerstone, which is a simple process, though more complex than the tool-making behaviours of non-human primates.

The Middle Pliocene of Woranso–Mille features grazing impalas, alcelaphins, and elephants, as well as browsing giraffes, tragelaphins, and forest-dwelling monkeys. The feet of the bovid species do not seem to be specialised for any particular type of ground (such as wet, pliable, or hard), and the teeth of hoofed species indicates an equal abundance of grazers, browsers and mixed feeders. These suggest a mixed environment which features both open grasslands as well as forests probably growing on a lake- or riverside. Similar mosaic landscapes were inhabited by A. anamensis and A. afarensis who seem to have had no preferred environment.

== See also ==
- African archaeology
- Little Foot
- List of fossil sites (with link directory)
- List of human evolution fossils (with images)
