= Valery Alekseyev (anthropologist) =

Soviet anthropologist

Valery Pavlovich Alekseyev, sometimes Alexeev (Russian: Вале́рий Па́влович Алексе́ев; 22 August 1929 – 7 November 1991) was a Soviet anthropologist, director of the Institute of Archaeology in Moscow (1987–1991) and member of the Soviet Academy of Sciences, exceptionally without having been a member of the Communist Party.

The Moscow-born Alekseyev proposed Homo rudolfensis in 1986. In 2006, the Russian Academy of Sciences established the Valery Alekseyev Award for Outstanding Achievements in Anthropology and Archaeology. Alekseyev died suddenly from thromboses in Moscow on 7 November 1991, aged 62.

The award-winning popular science book on human evolution Who Asked the First Question? Origins of Human Choral Singing, Intelligence, Language and Speech (2006) is dedicated to the memory of Alekseyev and his lifelong friend, Georgian anthropologist Malkhaz Abdushelishvili.

== Scientific activity ==
Alekseev (together with A.I. Pershits) authored such university textbooks as The History of primitive society, which has already passed six editions (the last in 2007). In the division of humans into races, he distinguished Caucasians, Negroids and Mongoloids. Moreover, he connected Caucasians with Negroids. In the characteristic of the first, V.P. Alekseev has seen the Neanderthal addition. The peculiarity of the Mongoloids was the influence by synanthropes. He divided the Caucasians into northern (Baltic) and southern (Mediterranean, Armenoid and Indo-Afghan). Alekseev also singled out "mixed" or "transitional" races, for example, the Ural race.

== Bibliography ==
Alekseyev published 20 books and some 500 articles, including:

- Историческая антропология и этногенез (Historical anthropology and ethnogenesis) (1989)
- География человеческих рас (Geography of the human race) (1974)
- The Origin of the Human Race. Progress Publishers (1986), ISBN 978-0-8285-3325-6.
- Палеоантропология земного шара и формирование человеческих рас (Global paleoanthropology and the formation of the human races)
- Происхождение народов Восточной Европы (Origin of the peoples of Eastern Europe)
- Происхождение народов Кавказа (Origin of the peoples of the Caucasus) (1974)
