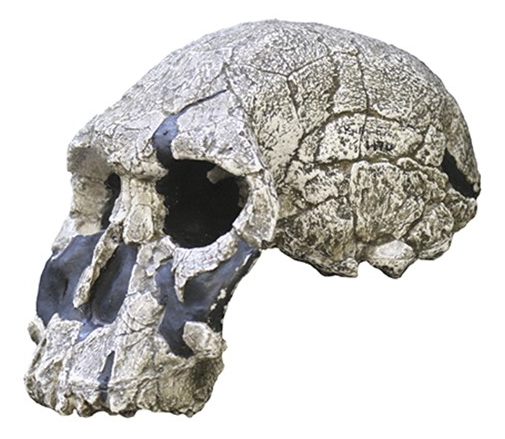
- Reconstruction of the KNM-ER 1470 skull

Scientific classification
- Kingdom: Animalia
- Phylum: Chordata
- Class: Mammalia
- Order: Primates
- Superfamily: Hominoidea
- Family: Hominidae
- Genus: Homo (?)
- Species: †H. rudolfensis

Binomial name
- †Homo rudolfensis (Alekseyev, 1986)

Synonyms
- Pithecanthropus rudolfensis Alekseyev, 1986; Australopithecus rudolfensis (Alekseyev, 1986); Kenyanthropus rudolfensis (Cameron, 2003)

= Homo rudolfensis =

Homo rudolfensis Temporal range: Pleistocene, 2.5/1.9–1.85/1.55 Ma

Extinct hominin from the Early Pleistocene of East Africa

Homo rudolfensis is an extinct species of archaic human from the Early Pleistocene of East Africa about 2 million years ago (mya). Because H. rudolfensis coexisted with several other hominins, it is debated what specimens can be confidently assigned to this species beyond the lectotype skull KNM-ER 1470 and other partial skull aspects. No bodily remains are definitively assigned to H. rudolfensis. Consequently, both its generic classification and validity are debated without any wide consensus, with some recommending the species to actually belong to the genus Australopithecus as A. rudolfensis or Kenyanthropus as K. rudolfensis, or that it is synonymous with the contemporaneous and anatomically similar H. habilis.

H. rudolfensis is distinguished from H. habilis by larger size, but it is also argued that this species actually consists of male H. habilis specimens, assuming that H. habilis was sexually dimorphic and males were much larger than females. Because no bodily remains are definitely identified, body size estimates are largely based on the stature of H. habilis. Using this, male H. rudolfensis may have averaged about 160 cm (5 ft 3 in) in height and 60 kg (130 lb) in weight, and females 150 cm (4 ft 11 in) and 51 kg (112 lb). KNM-ER 1470 had a brain volume of about 750 cc (46 cu in). Like other early Homo, H. rudolfensis had large cheek teeth and thick enamel.

Early Homo species exhibit marked brain growth compared to Australopithecus predecessors, which is typically explained as a change in diet with a calorie-rich food source, namely meat. Though not associated with tools, dental anatomy suggests some processing of plant or meat fiber before consumption, though the mouth could still effectively chew through mechanically challenging food, indicating tool use did not greatly affect diet.

== Research history ==
The first fossils were discovered in 1972 along Lake Turkana (at the time called Lake Rudolf) in Kenya, and were detailed by Kenyan palaeoanthropologist Richard Leakey the following year. The specimens were: a large and nearly complete skull (KNM-ER 1470, the lectotype) discovered by Bernard Ngeneo, a local; a right femur (KNM-ER 1472) discovered by J. Harris; an upper femur (proximal) fragment (KNM-ER 1475) discovered by fossil collector Kamoya Kimeu; and a complete left femur (KNM-ER 1481) discovered by Harris. However, it is unclear if the femora belong to the same species as the skull. Leakey classified them under the genus Homo because he had reconstructed the skull fragments so that it had a large brain volume and a flat face, but did not assign them to a species. Because the horizon they were discovered in was, at the time, dated to 2.9–2.6 million years ago (mya), Leakey thought these specimens were a very early human ancestor. This challenged the major model of human evolution at the time where Australopithecus africanus gave rise to Homo about 2.5 mya, but if Homo had already existed at this time, it would call for serious revisions. However, the area was redated to about 2 mya in 1977 (the same time period as H. habilis and H. ergaster/H. erectus), and more precisely to 2.1–1.95 mya in 2012. They were first assigned to the species habilis in 1975 by anthropologists Colin Groves and Vratislav Mazák. In 1978, in a joint paper with Leakey and English anthropologist Alan Walker, Walker suggested the remains belong in Australopithecus (and that the skull was incorrectly reconstructed), but Leakey still believed they belonged to Homo, though they both agreed that the remains could belong to habilis.

Homo family tree showing H. rudolfensis and H. habilis at the base as offshoots of the human line:

- - - H. habilis
    - H. rudolfensis
  - - H. ergaster
    - - H. erectus
      - - H. antecessor
        - - - H. heidelbergensis
            - H. neanderthalensis
          - H. sapiens

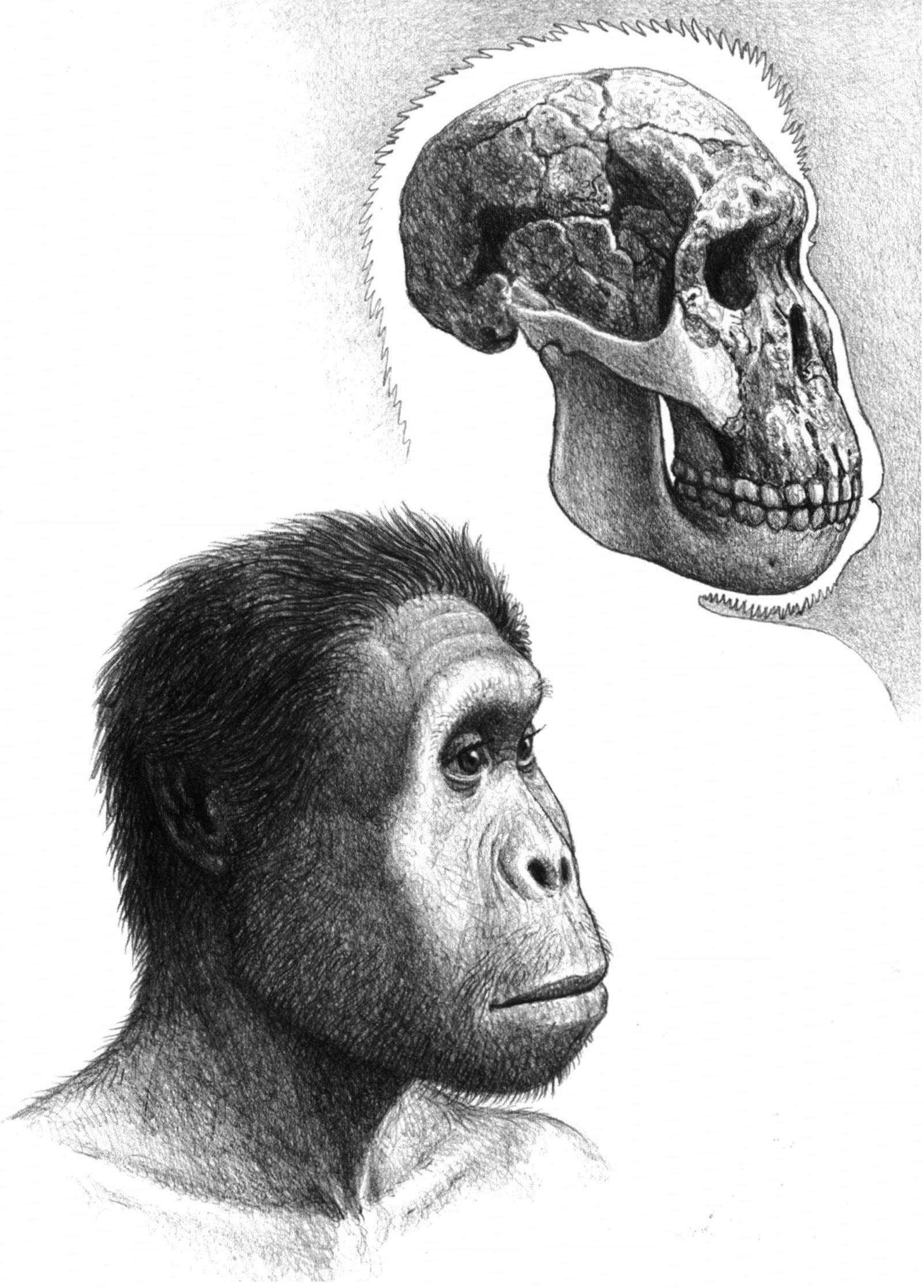
Reconstruction of H. rudolfensis by Mauricio Antón

KNM-ER 1470 was much larger than the Olduvai remains, so the terms H. habilis sensu lato ("in the broad sense") and H. habilis sensu stricto ("in the strict sense") were used to include or exclude the larger morph, respectively. In 1986, English palaeoanthropologist Bernard Wood first suggested these remains represent a different Homo species, which coexisted with H. habilis and H. ergaster/H. erectus. Coexisting Homo species conflicted with the predominant model of human evolution at the time which was that modern humans evolved in a straight line directly from H. ergaster/H. erectus which evolved directly from H. habilis. In 1986, the remains were placed into a new species, rudolfensis, by Russian anthropologist Valery Alekseyev (but he used the genus Pithecanthropus, which was changed to Homo three years later by Groves). In 1999, Kennedy argued that the name was invalid because Alekseyev had not assigned a holotype. Pointing out that this is in fact not mandatory, Wood the same year nevertheless designated KNM-ER 1470 as the lectotype. However, the validity of this species has also been debated on material grounds, with some arguing that H. habilis was highly sexually dimorphic like modern non-human apes, with the larger skulls classified as "H. rudolfensis" actually representing male H. habilis. In 1999, Wood and biological anthropologist Mark Collard recommended moving rudolfensis and habilis to Australopithecus based on the similarity of dental adaptations. However, they conceded that dental anatomy is highly variable among hominins and not always reliable when formulating family trees.

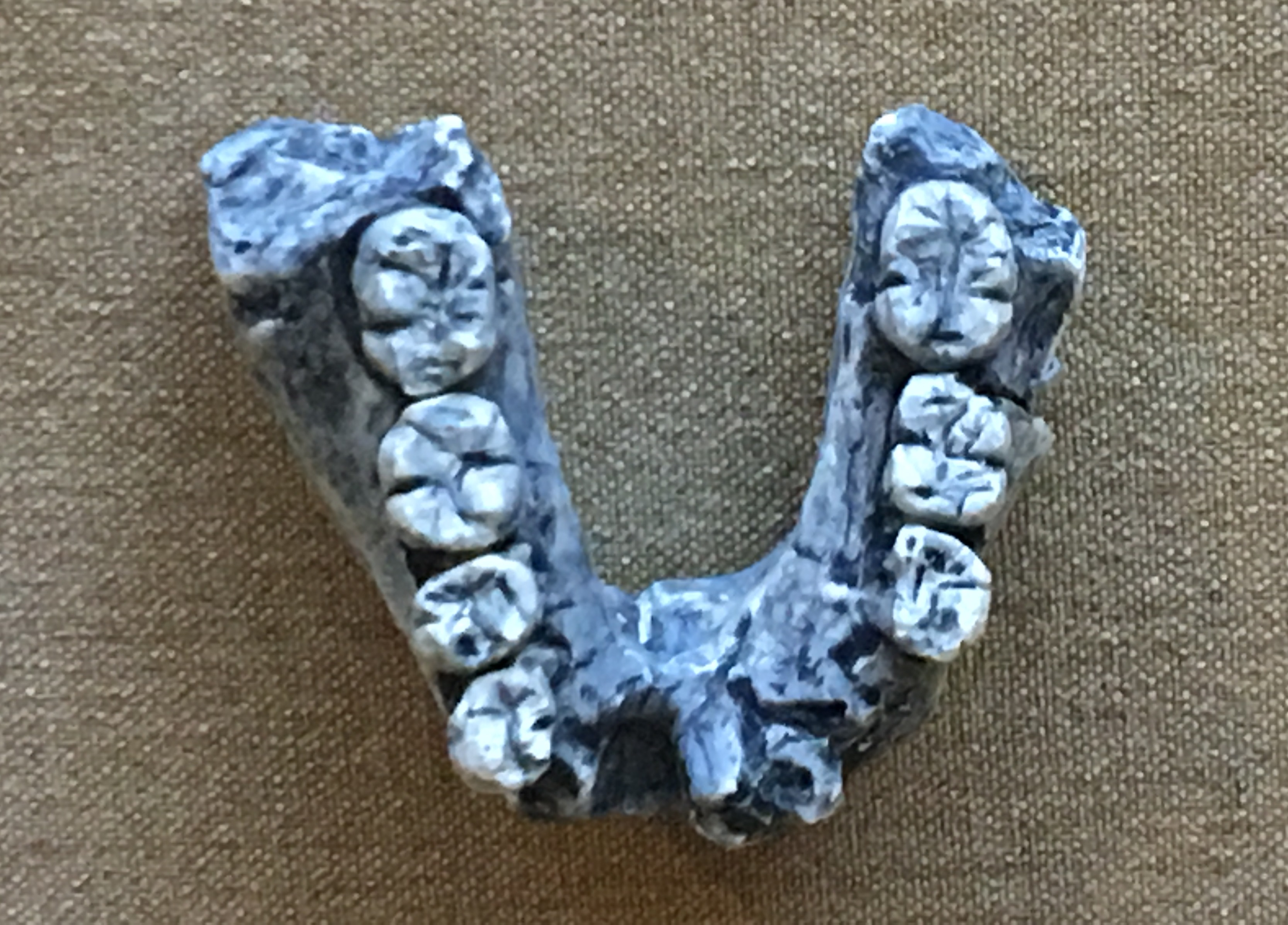
KNM-ER 1802

In 2003, Australian anthropologist David Cameron concluded that the earlier australopithecine Kenyanthropus platyops was the ancestor of rudolfensis, and reclassified it as K. rudolfensis. He also believed that Kenyanthropus was more closely related to Paranthropus than Homo. In 2008, a re-reconstruction of the skull concluded it was incorrectly restored originally, though agreed with the classification as H. rudolfensis. In 2012, British palaeoanthropologist Meave Leakey described the juvenile partial face KNM-ER 62000 discovered in Koobi Fora, Kenya; noting it shares several similarities to KNM-ER 1470 and is smaller, she assigned it to H. rudolfensis, and, because prepubescent male and female bones should be indistinguishable, differences between juvenile H. rudolfensis and adult H. habilis specimens support species distinction. She also concluded that the jawbone KNM-ER 1802, an important specimen often used in classifying other specimens as H. rudolfensis, actually belongs to a different (possibly undescribed) species, but American palaeoanthropologist Tim D. White believes this to be premature because it is unclear how wide the range of variation is in early hominins. The 2013 discovery of the 1.8 Ma Georgian Dmanisi skulls which exhibit several similarities with early Homo have led to suggestions that all contemporary groups of early Homo in Africa, including H. habilis and H. rudolfensis, are the same species and should be assigned to H. erectus. There is still no wide consensus on how rudolfensis and habilis relate to H. ergaster and descendent species.

Beyond KNM-ER 1470, there is disagreement on which specimens actually belong in H. rudolfensis as it is difficult to assign with accuracy remains that do not preserve the face and jaw. No H. rudolfensis bodily elements have been definitively associated with a skull and thus to the species. Most proposed H. rudolfensis fossils come from Koobi Fora and date to 1.9–1.85 mya. Remains from the Shungura Formation, Ethiopia, and Uraha, Malawi, are dated as far back as 2.5–2.4 mya, which would make it the earliest identified species of Homo. The latest potential specimen is KNM-ER 819 dating to 1.65–1.55 mya.

Nonetheless, H. rudolfensis and H. habilis generally are recognised members of the genus at the base of the family tree, with arguments for synonymisation or removal from the genus not widely adopted. Though it is now largely agreed upon that Homo evolved from Australopithecus, the timing and placement of this split has been much debated, with many Australopithecus species having been proposed as the ancestor. The discovery of LD 350-1, the oldest Homo specimen, dating to 2.8 mya, in the Afar Region of Ethiopia may indicate that the genus evolved from A. afarensis around this time. The species LD 350-1 belongs to could be the ancestor of H. rudolfensis and H. habilis, but this is unclear. Based on 2.1 million year old stone tools from Shangchen, China, possibly an ancestral species to H. rudolfensis and H. habilis dispersed across Asia.

African Hominin timeline

== Anatomy ==
=== Skull ===
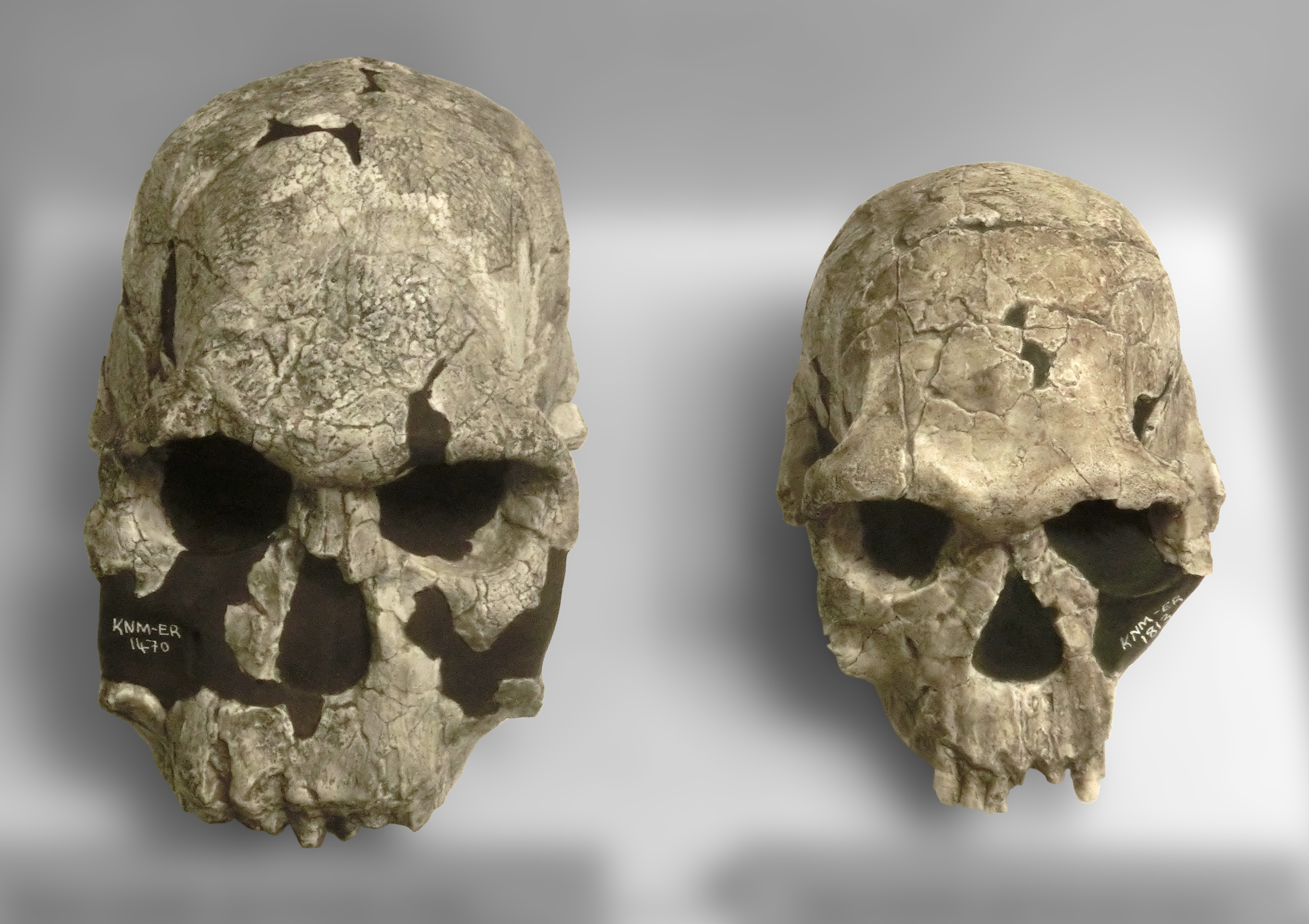
KNM-ER 1470 H. rudolfensis (left) vs KNM-ER 1813 H. habilis (right)

In 1973, Richard Leakey had reconstructed the skull KNM-ER 1470 with a flat face and a brain volume of 800 cc (49 cu in). In 1983, American physical anthropologist Ralph Holloway revised the base of the skull and calculated a brain volume of 752–753 cc (45.9–46.0 cu in). For comparison, H. habilis specimens average about 600 cc (37 cu in), and H. ergaster 850 cc (52 cu in). Anthropologist Timothy Bromage and colleagues revised the face again at a 5° incline (slightly prognathic) instead of completely flat, but pushed the nasal bone back directly beneath the frontal bones. He then said it was possible to predict brain size based on just the face and (disregarding the braincase) calculated 526 cc (32.1 cu in), and chalked up the errors of Leakey's reconstruction to a lack of research of the biological principles of facial anatomy at the time as well as confirmation bias, as a flat-faced reconstruction of the skull aligned with the predominant model of human evolution at the time. This was refuted by American palaeoanthropologist John D. Hawks because the skull remained more or less unchanged except for the 5° rotation outwards. Bromage and colleagues returned in 2008 with a revised skull reconstruction and brain volume estimate of 700 cc (43 cu in).

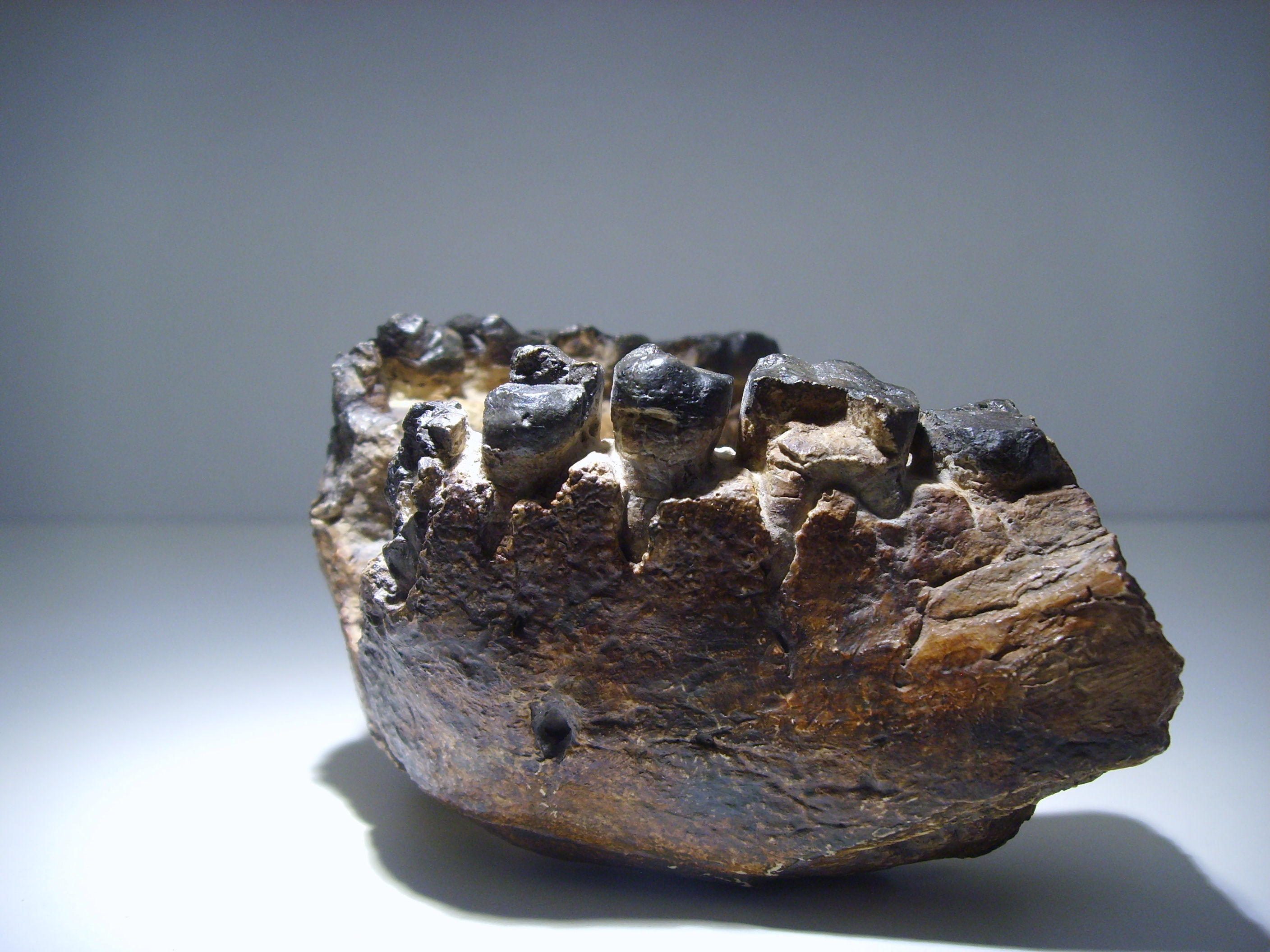
UR 501, the oldest H. rudolfensis specimen

Fossils have generally been classified into H. rudolfensis due to large skull size, flatter and broader face, broader cheek teeth, more complex tooth crowns and roots, and thicker enamel compared to H. habilis. Early Homo are characterised by larger teeth compared to later Homo. The cheek teeth of KNM-ER 60000, a jawbone, in terms of size are on the lower end for early Homo, except for the third molar which is within range. The molars increase in size towards the back of the mouth. The tooth rows of KNM-ER 1470, KNM-ER 60000, and KNM-ER 62000 are rectangular, whereas the tooth row of KNM-ER 1802 is U-shaped, which may indicate that these two morphs represent different species, or demonstrate the normal range of variation for H. rudolfensis jaws. In UR 501 from Uraha, Malawi—the oldest H. rudolfensis specimen dating to 2.5–2.3 mya—the tooth enamel thickness is the same as in other early Homo, but the enamel on the molars is almost as thick as Paranthropus molars (which have some of the thickest enamel of any hominin). Such a wide variation in enamel thickness across the cheek teeth is not exhibited in KNM-ER 1802, which may indicate regional differences among H. rudolfensis populations.

=== Build ===
Body size estimates of H. rudolfensis and H. habilis typically conclude a small size comparable to australopithecines. These largely depend on the H. habilis partial skeleton OH 62 estimated at 100–120 cm (3 ft 3 in – 3 ft 11 in) in height and 20–37 kg (44–82 lb) in weight. H. rudolfensis is thought to be bigger than H. habilis, but it is unclear how big this species was as no bodily elements have been definitively associated with a skull. Based on just the KNM-ER 1470 skull, male H. rudolfensis were estimated to have been 160 cm (5 ft 3 in) in height and 60 kg (130 lb) in weight, and females 150 cm (4 ft 11 in) and 51 kg (112 lb).

For specimens that might be H. rudolfensis: the femur KNM-ER 1472 which may also be H. habilis or H. ergaster was estimated at 155.9 cm (5 ft 1 in) and 41.8 kg (92 lb), the humerus KNM-ER 1473 162.9 cm (5 ft 4 in) and 47.1 kg (104 lb), the partial leg KNM-ER 1481 which may also be H. ergaster 156.7 cm (5 ft 2 in) and 41.8 kg (92 lb), the pelvis KNM-ER 3228 which may also be H. ergaster 165.8 cm (5 ft 5 in) and 47.2 kg (104 lb), and the femur KNM-ER 3728 which may be H. habilis or P. boisei 153.3 cm (5 ft) and 40.3 kg (89 lb). It is generally assumed that pre-H. ergaster hominins, including H. rudolfensis and H. habilis, exhibited sexual dimorphism with males markedly bigger than females. However, relative female body mass is unknown in either species.

Early hominins, including H. rudolfensis, are thought to have had thick body hair coverage like modern non-human apes because they appear to have inhabited cooler regions and are thought to have had a less active lifestyle than (presumed hairless) post-ergaster species, and so probably required thick body hair to stay warm. The juvenile specimen KNM-ER 62000, a partial face, has the same age landmarks as a 13 to 14 year old modern human, but more likely died at around 8 years of age due to the presumed faster growth rate among early hominins based on dental development rate.

== Culture ==
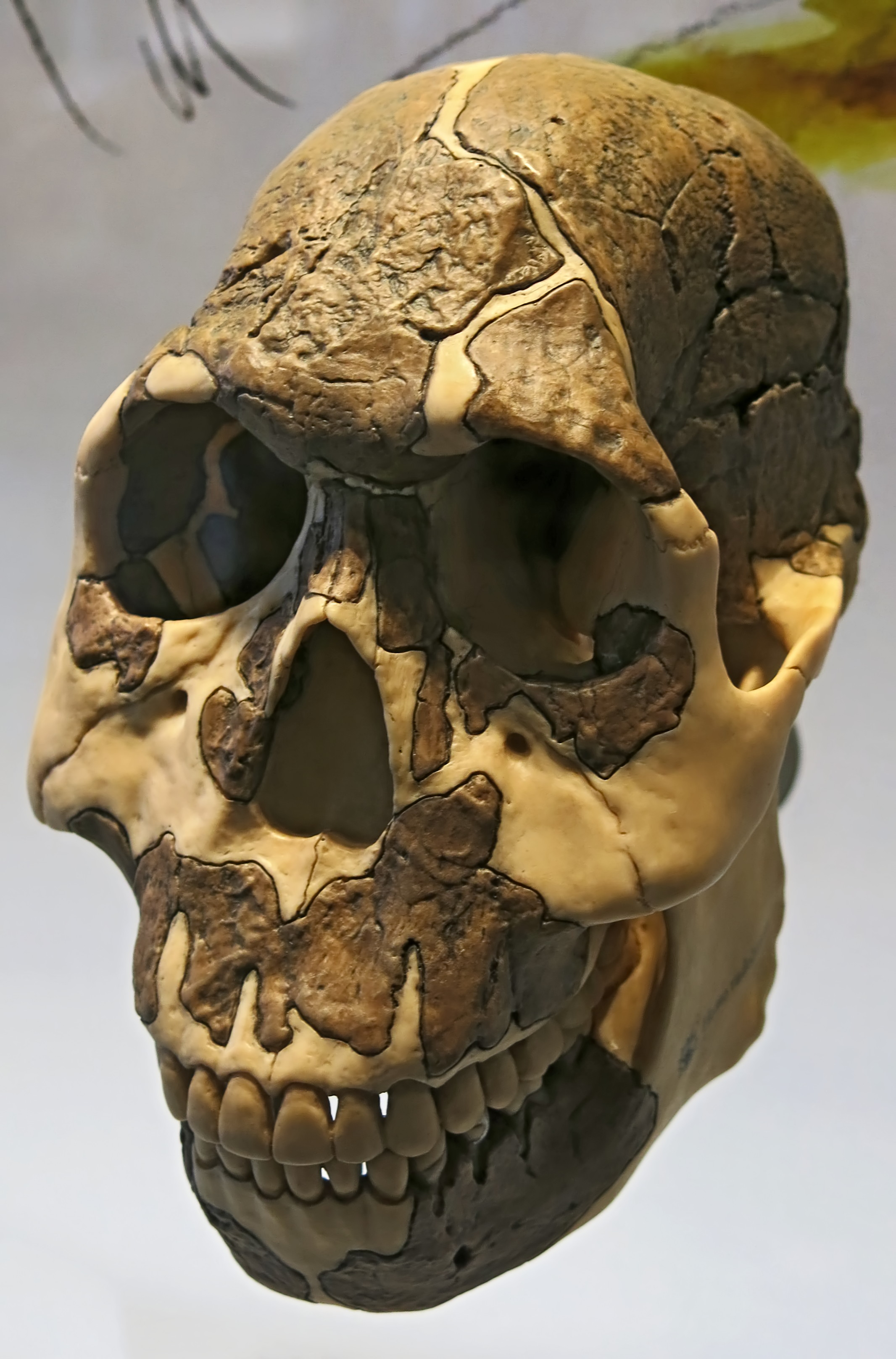
Reconstruction of KNM-ER 1470 skull and jaw

It is typically thought that the diets of early Homo had a greater proportion of meat than Australopithecus, and that this led to brain growth. The main hypotheses regarding this are: meat is energy- and nutrient-rich and put evolutionary pressure on developing enhanced cognitive skills to facilitate strategic scavenging and monopolise fresh carcasses, or meat allowed the large and calorie-expensive ape gut to decrease in size allowing this energy to be diverted to brain growth. Alternatively, it is also suggested that early Homo, in a drying climate with scarcer food options, relied primarily on underground storage organs (such as tubers) and food sharing, which facilitated social bonding among both male and female group members. However, unlike what is presumed for H. ergaster and later Homo, short-statured early Homo were likely incapable of endurance running and hunting, and the long and Australopithecus-like forearm of H. habilis could indicate early Homo were still arboreal to a degree. Also, organised hunting and gathering is thought to have emerged in H. ergaster. Nonetheless, the proposed food-gathering models to explain large brain growth necessitate increased daily travel distance. Large incisor size in H. rudolfensis and H. habilis compared to Australopithecus predecessors implies these two species relied on incisors more. The large, Australopithecus-like molars could indicate more mechanically challenging food compared to later Homo. The bodies of the mandibles of H. rudolfensis and other early Homo are thicker than those of modern humans and all living apes, more comparable to Australopithecus. The mandibular body resists torsion from the bite force or chewing, meaning their jaws could produce unusually powerful stresses while eating.

H. rudolfensis is not associated with any tools. However, the greater molar cusp relief in H. rudolfensis and H. habilis compared to Australopithecus suggests the former two used tools to fracture tough foods (such as pliable plant parts or meat), otherwise the cusps would have been more worn down. Nonetheless, the jaw adaptations for processing mechanically challenging food indicates technological advancement did not greatly affect their diet. Large concentrations of stone tools are known from Koobi Fora. Because these aggregations are coincident with the emergence of H. ergaster, it is probable H. ergaster manufactured them, though it is not possible to definitively attribute the tools to a species because H. rudolfensis, H. habilis, and P. boisei are also well known from the area. The oldest specimen of Homo, LD 350-1, is associated with the Oldowan stone tool industry, meaning this tradition had been in use by the genus since near its emergence.

Early H. rudolfensis and Paranthropus have exceptionally thick molars for hominins, and the emergence of these two coincides with a cooling and aridity trend in Africa about 2.5 mya. This could mean they evolved due to climate change. Nonetheless, in East Africa, tropical forests and woodlands still persisted through periods of drought. H. rudolfensis coexisted with H. habilis, H. ergaster, and P. boisei.

== See also ==
- African archaeology
- Australopithecus africanus – Extinct hominid from South Africa
- Australopithecus sediba – Two-million-year-old hominin from the Cradle of Humankind
- Homo ergaster – Extinct species or subspecies of archaic human
- Homo gautengensis – Name proposed for an extinct species of hominin from South Africa
- Homo habilis – Archaic human species from 2.4 to 1.65 mya
- LD 350-1 – Earliest known specimen of the genus Homo
- Paranthropus boisei – Extinct species of hominin of East Africa
- Paranthropus robustus – Extinct species of hominin of South Africa
