= Lomekwi =

Kenyan archaeological site dated to 3.3 million years ago

- LOM3
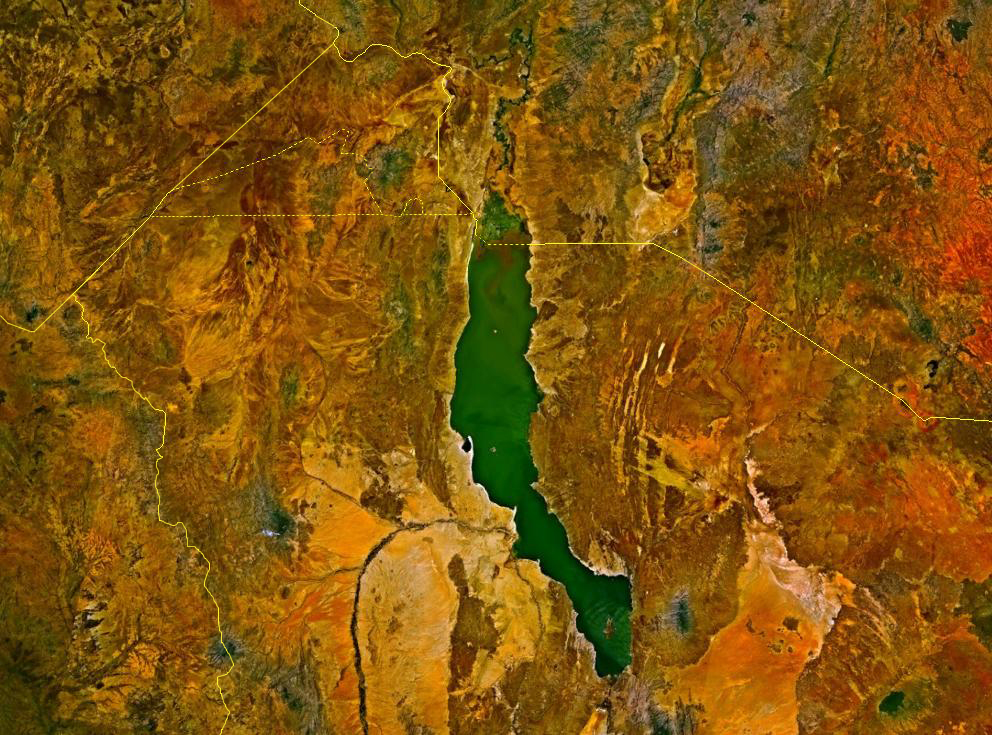
- Lomekwi is near the west bank of Lake Turkana, which is pictured in green on this satellite image.

- Location within Kenya
- 3°52′27″N 35°45′3″E
- Type: Ancient campsite
- Periods: 3.3 million years ago
- Cultures: Australopithecus or Kenyanthropus
- Location: Turkana County, Kenya
- Region: Rift Valley Province

Site notes
- Excavation dates: 2011–present
- Archaeologists: Sonia Harmand, Stony Brook University, US
- Public access: Limited

Lomekwi is an archaeological site located on the west bank of Lake Turkana in Kenya. It is an important milestone in the history of human archaeology. An archaeological team from Stony Brook University in the United States discovered traces of Lomekwi by chance in July 2011, and made substantial progress with four years of in-depth excavations.

Artifacts excavated from Lomekwi date back to 3.3 million years ago, extending the history of human ancestral use and tool making about 500,000 years further than previously known. The most conspicuous among these cultural relics is a large stone tool with obvious traces of processing by human forebears. It looks like a cutting board, but its exact purpose is not clear.

The artifacts from Lomekwi have a unique production method and are of independent production style. The archaeological team calls it Lomekwian. The Lomekwi 3 tools suggest that early hominins possessed basic perceptual, motor and problem-solving abilities involved in selecting and manipulating stone materials. Some Lomekwian techniques may have required greater cognitive control than simple stone-pounding behaviours observed in non-human primates. However, early stone-tool production does not necessarily imply modern human-like cognition or high-fidelity cultural transmission, as simple knapping techniques may also be individually rediscovered.

== Discovery ==
In July 2011, a team of archeologists led by Sonia Harmand and Jason Lewis of Stony Brook University, United States, were heading to a site near Lake Turkana, Kenya near where Kenyanthropus platyops fossils had previously been found. The group made a wrong turn on the way and ended up in a previously unexplored region and decided to do some surveying. They quickly found some stone artifacts on the site, which they named Lomekwi 3. A year later, they returned to the site for a full excavation. Harmand presented her findings at the annual meeting of the Paleoanthropology Society on April 14, 2015 and published the full announcement and results on the cover of Nature on May 21, 2015.

== Artifacts ==
Around 20 well preserved artifacts have been dug up at Lomekwi 3, including anvils, cores, and flakes. An additional 130 artifacts were found on the surface. In one instance, Harmand's team was able to match a flake to its core, suggesting a hominin had made and discarded the tool at the site. The tools were generally quite large – larger than the oldest known stone tools, recovered in the Gona area of the Afar Region of Ethiopia, in 1992. The largest weighs 15 kg, and may have been used as an anvil. According to Harmand, it appeared that the tool makers had purposely selected large, heavy blocks of strong stone, ignoring smaller blocks of the same material found in the area. She ruled out the possibility that the tools were actually natural rock formations, saying "The artifacts were clearly knapped and not the result of accidental fracture of rocks". Analysis suggested the cores had been rotated as flakes were struck off. The purpose of the tools found at Lomekwi 3 is unclear, as animal bones found at the site do not bear any sign of hominin activity. This is the greatest expression of late Neogene technology known to the archaeological record.

Based on the buried artifacts' stratigraphic position (in undisturbed sediment) relative to two layers of volcanic ash and known magnetic reversals, Harmand and her team dated the tools to 3.3 million years ago. The finds at Lomekwi therefore represent the oldest stone tools ever discovered, predating the Gona tools, dated to 2.6 mya, by 700,000 years.

== Hominin evolution ==
The date predates the genus Homo by 500,000 years, suggesting this tool making was undertaken by Australopithecus or Kenyanthropus (which was found near Lomekwi 3). Previously, evidence of stone tool use by Australopithecus has been suggested on the basis of cut-marks on animal bones, but those findings have been debated, with no scientific consensus forming on either side of the debate.

Harmand said the Lomekwi 3 artifacts do not fit into the Oldowan tool making tradition and should be considered part of a distinct tradition, which she termed Lomekwian. It has been hypothesized that tool making may have aided in the evolution of Homo into a distinct genus. However, it is unclear whether the Lomekwian tools are related to those made by Homo species – it is possible the technology was forgotten and later rediscovered. Comparative primate research also suggests that stone technology was probably preceded by a much older, archaeologically largely “invisible” phase of tool use, including percussive stone use and especially perishable plant tools. Because organic tool use occurs across living great apes, an “organic tool age” may have preceded the archaeological Stone Age.

Independent researchers who have seen the tools are generally supportive of Harmand's conclusions. George Washington University anthropologist Alison Brooks said the tools "could not have been created by natural forces ... the dating evidence is fairly solid." Rick Potts, head of the Human Origins Program at the Smithsonian Institution, said the tools represented a more primitive style than known human-made tools, but something more sophisticated than what modern chimpanzees do. "There's no doubt it's purposeful" toolmaking, he remarked. A Paleoanthropologist Zeresenay Alemseged, who was responsible for the earlier research suggesting Australopithecus had made tools, also backed Harmand's conclusions.
