= Sonia Harmand =

French archaeologist (born 1974)

Sonia Harmand (born in 1974) is a French archaeologist who studies Early Stone Age archaeology and the evolution of stone tool making. She received her undergraduate degree from the University of Paris where she was associated with the "Prehistory and Technology" research unit, which was well known in the field of stone tool analysis. Harmand earned a PhD from Paris Nanterre University, and is a research associate at CNRS, which is the largest French governmental research organization, and Europe's largest fundamental science agency. She worked as a Research Scientist at CNRS for four years before joining Stony Brook University in New York as an associate professor. In 2016 she was named one of the '50 Most Influential French' by the French edition of Vanity Fair magazine, ranked 32nd place.

== Early stone age archaeology ==
=== Lomekwi 3 stone tools ===
In 2011, Harmand discovered the Lomekwi 3 stone tools in the Turkana Basin of Kenya near the town of Lomekwi. This discovery was made while Harmand was leading the West Turkana Archaeological Project team along with Jason Lewis. They were both working with Stony Brook University's Turkana Basin Institute at the time.

At the Lomekwi 3 site, between 2011 and 2012, there were 149 stone artifacts recovered in total. These artifacts were found at the Lomekwi 3 site which sits above the Toroto Tuff, dated at about 3.32 Ma. The 149 artifacts range from small broken flakes weighing less than 1 kg to anvils and passive elements weighing about 12 kg. All of these tools are evidence of knapped stone tools. Stone tool knapping was previously associated with the genus Homo. The discovery of stone tools from the Olduvai Gorge in Tanzania dating to about 2.6 Ma brought forth a theory of non-Homo hominins usage of stone tools since there is only fossil evidence of Homo from 2.4-2.3 Ma. The tools found at Lomekwi 3 are dated to ≈3.3 Ma which pushes back the evidence of stone tool use by nearly 700,000 years, and further expands the overall archaeological record. Furthermore, these discoveries support the theory of usage of stone tools by non-homo hominids. Harmand and other archaeologists and paleoanthropologists suspect Australophithecines including: A. Africanus, A. Sediba, A. Garhi, A. Aethiopicus, and A. Robustus to be possible non-homo stone tool knappers. The Lomekwi 3 site is still currently under excavation and the West Turkana Archaeological Project team continues fieldwork in the Turkana Basin every summer.

=== Acheulean tools ===
Harmand additionally worked along the northwest shore of Lake Turkana in Kenya in 2011, recovering and studying acheulean tools. The stone tools found at the Kokiselei 4 site are dated to about 1.76 Ma which pushes the evidence for acheulean tool use back an extra ≈300,000 years. Acheulean tools are thought to be connected to Homo Erectus because there were H. erectus fossils found in the same area which are dated at a similar age.

== Work at Stony Brook University ==
Sonia Harmand is currently an associate professor at New York's Stony Brook University teaching in the Anthropology Department. Along with professorial work, Harmand is an associate research scientist at the Centre national de la recherche scientifique (CNRS), and the head of the West Turkana Archeological Project (WTAP) as of 2012. Harmand's research utilizes the chaîne opératoire method to aid in her analysis of stone tools, which places emphasis on the interactions between tool-makers and their environment. The central focus of her research at Stony Brook is on the origins of hominin technology and the role of biomechanics in stone tool production.

== Honors and publications ==
Harmand has received many awards for her work with Early Stone Age archaeology. In 2015, Harmand won both the Stone Age Institute Award for Outstanding Research into Human Origins, and the Field Discovery Award from the Shanghai Archaeology Forum(世界考古论坛·上海) for her work with the Lomekwi 3 tools. The following year, in 2016, she earned the Prix La Recherche archaeology award in Paris, France. In 2017, the Tübingen research prize for Early Prehistory and Quaternary Ecology was awarded to Harmand from the University of Tübingen, Germany.
