= Calcified Tissue International =

- Discipline: Biochemistry
- Language: English
- Edited by: Roberto Civitelli, Stuart H. Ralston

Publication details
- Former name: Calcified Tissue Research
- History: 1967-present
- Publisher: Springer Science+Business Media
- Frequency: Monthly
- Impact factor: 4.333 (2020)

Standard abbreviations
- ISO 4: Calcif. Tissue Int.

Indexing
- CODEN: CTINDZ
- ISSN: 0171-967X (print); 1432-0827 (web)
- LCCN: 79649796
- OCLC no.: 42787226

Links
- Journal homepage

Calcified Tissue International is a peer-reviewed medical journal published by Springer Science+Business Media and first launched in 1967. From 1967 to 1978, the journal was published under the name Calcified Tissue Research. It is an official journal of the International Osteoporosis Foundation. The journal is published monthly and includes original research on the structure and function of bone and other mineralized systems in living organisms, as well as reviews and special reports.

The co-editors are Roberto Civitelli and Stuart H. Ralston. According to the Journal Citation Reports, the journal has a 2020 impact factor of 4.333.
