= OH 24 =

Homo habilis fossil

Twiggy
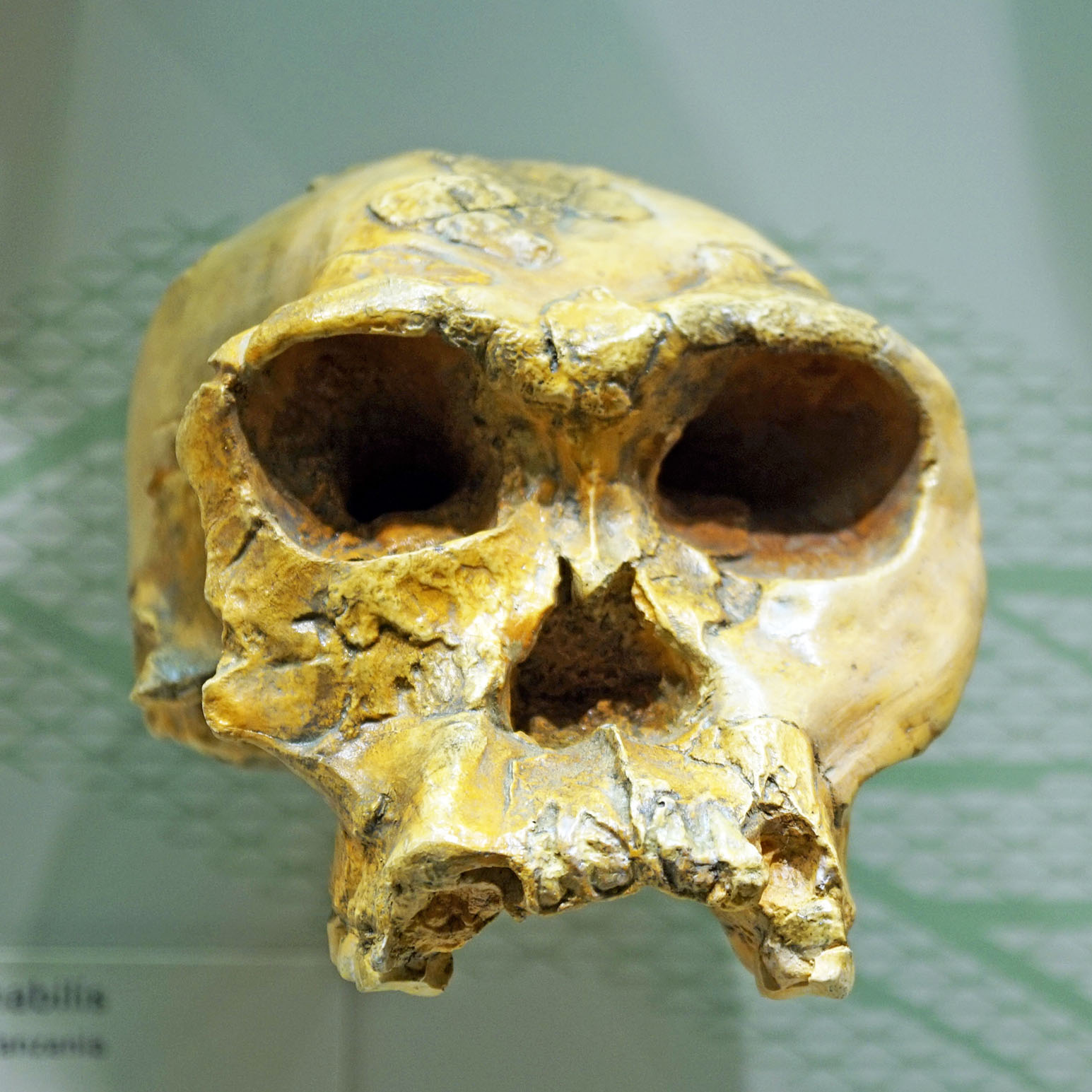
- Catalog no.: OH 24
- Common name: Twiggy
- Species: Homo habilis
- Age: 1.8 mya
- Place discovered: Olduvai Gorge, Tanzania
- Date discovered: 1968
- Discovered by: Peter Nzube

OH 24 (Olduvai Hominid No. 24) or Twiggy is a fossilized skull of the species Homo habilis. It was discovered in Olduvai Gorge, Tanzania by Peter Nzube in 1968. The skull was found crushed almost flat and was therefore named after the famously skinny model of the time Twiggy. Estimated at 1.8 mya (million years old), the cranium was found crushed flat and cemented together with a mass coating of limestone. It is now a Smithsonian exhibit item.

== Remnants ==
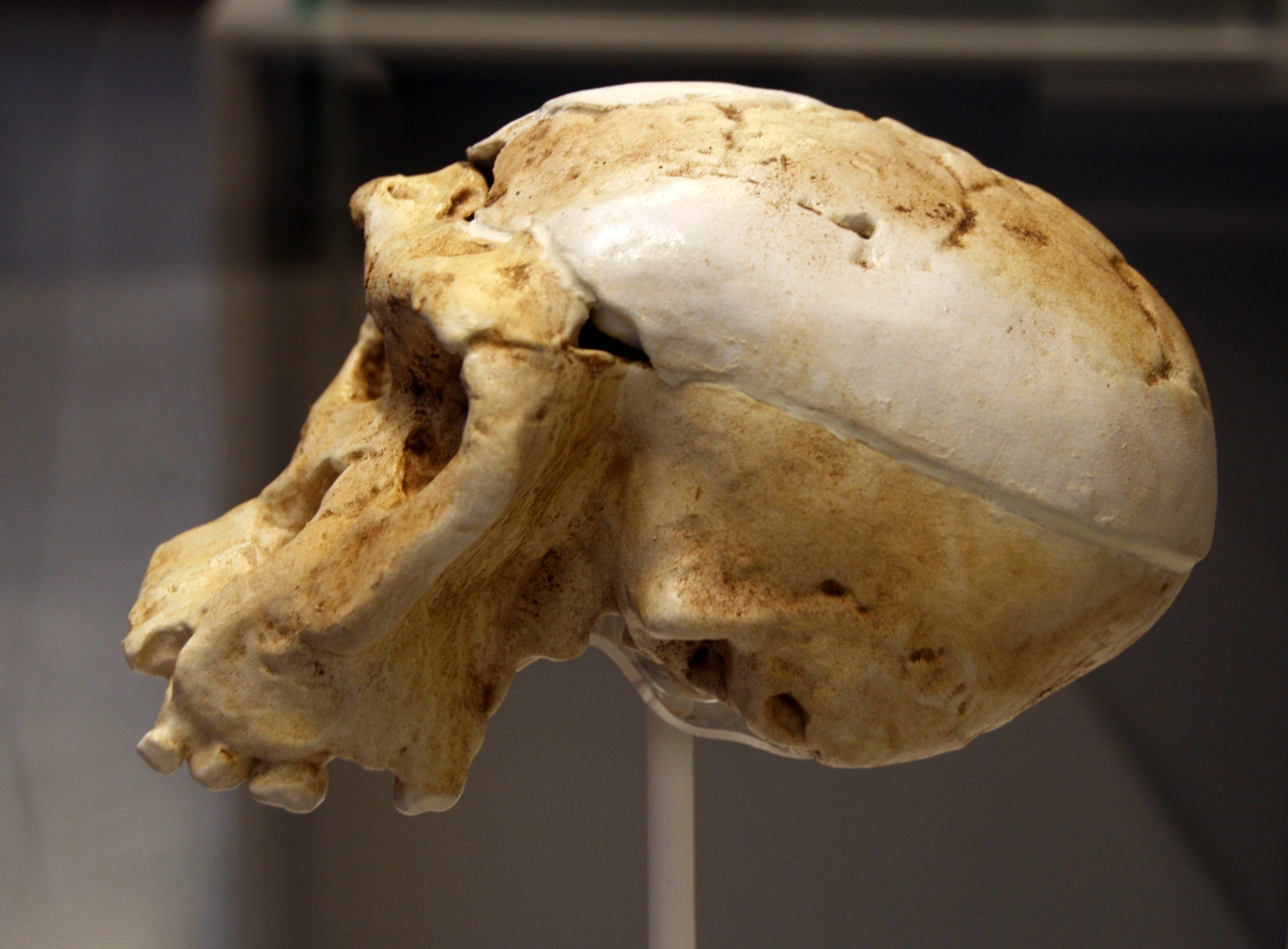
"Twiggy", a fossilized cranium at Olduvai Gorge, Tanzania

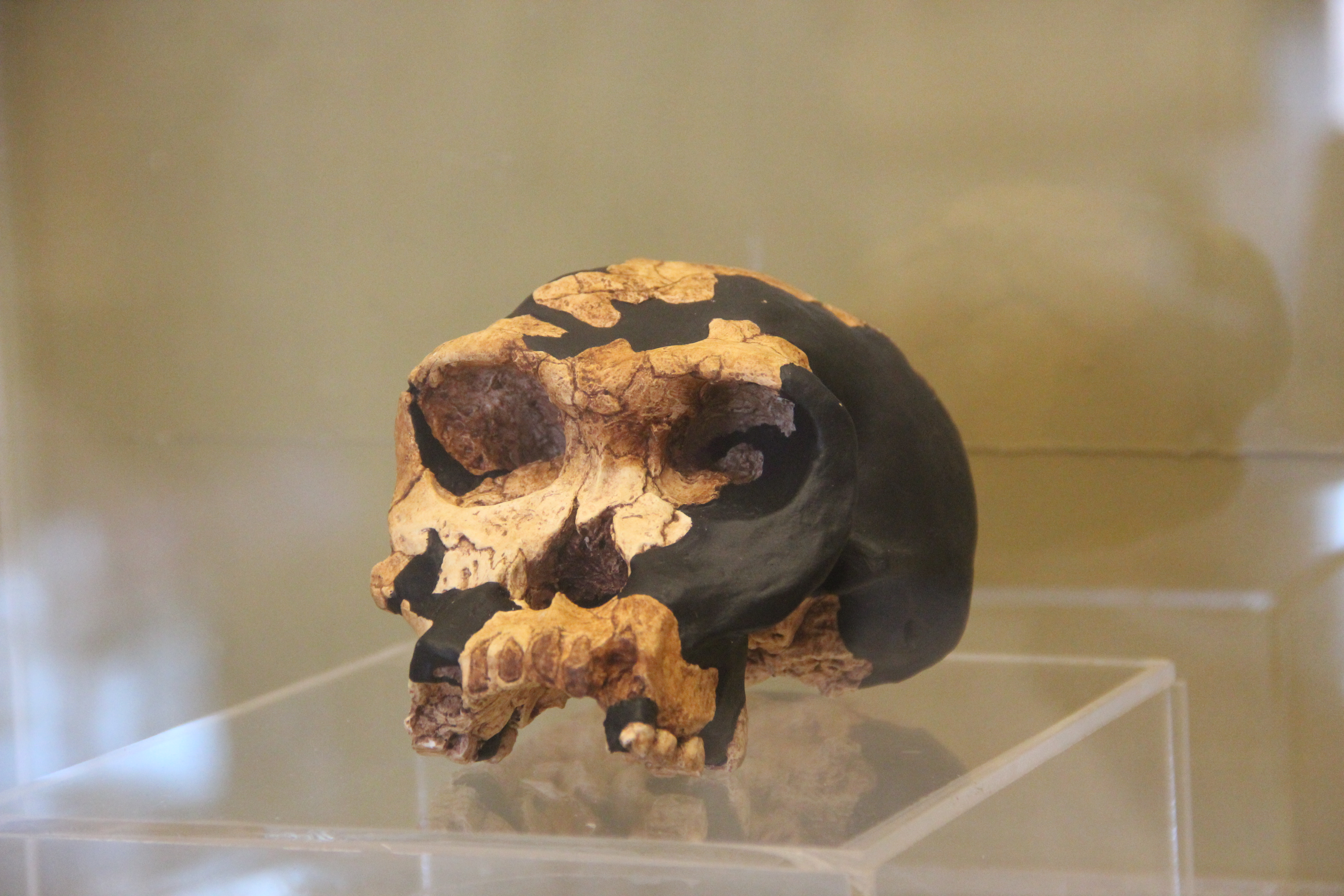
Fossilized skull "Twiggy"

Originally, there was very little interest placed on the discovery of the skull, but after much effort by scientist Ron Clarke, the skull was finally reconstructed and examined thoroughly. Despite this effort, there still is a good deal of distortion from the fossilization processes that took place. The small cranial capacity estimated at 590-600 cc (cubic centimeters) is in part attributed to this cranial distortion. OH 24's face is described as being prognathic (projecting forward under the nose), as in other fossils from the Homo habilis family, but not quite to the extent of earlier Australopithecus species. Besides manifesting lesser prognathism than the australopithecines, OH 24 also portrays a larger cranial vault, indicating an expansion in brain size from its ancestor, and the reduction of facial prognathisim typical of the evolution of early Homo.

The individual's third molars had erupted, which indicates that OH 24- "Twiggy" was an adult at death. Yet, these molars show no sign of wear (the points on the crowns of the teeth are still sharp, and show little sign of abrasion by rough food matter), indicating that this individual died soon after the eruption of these molars. Like the other fossils of Homo habilis, OH 24 also manifests the slightly small teeth set in a U-shaped arch.

== Dispute ==
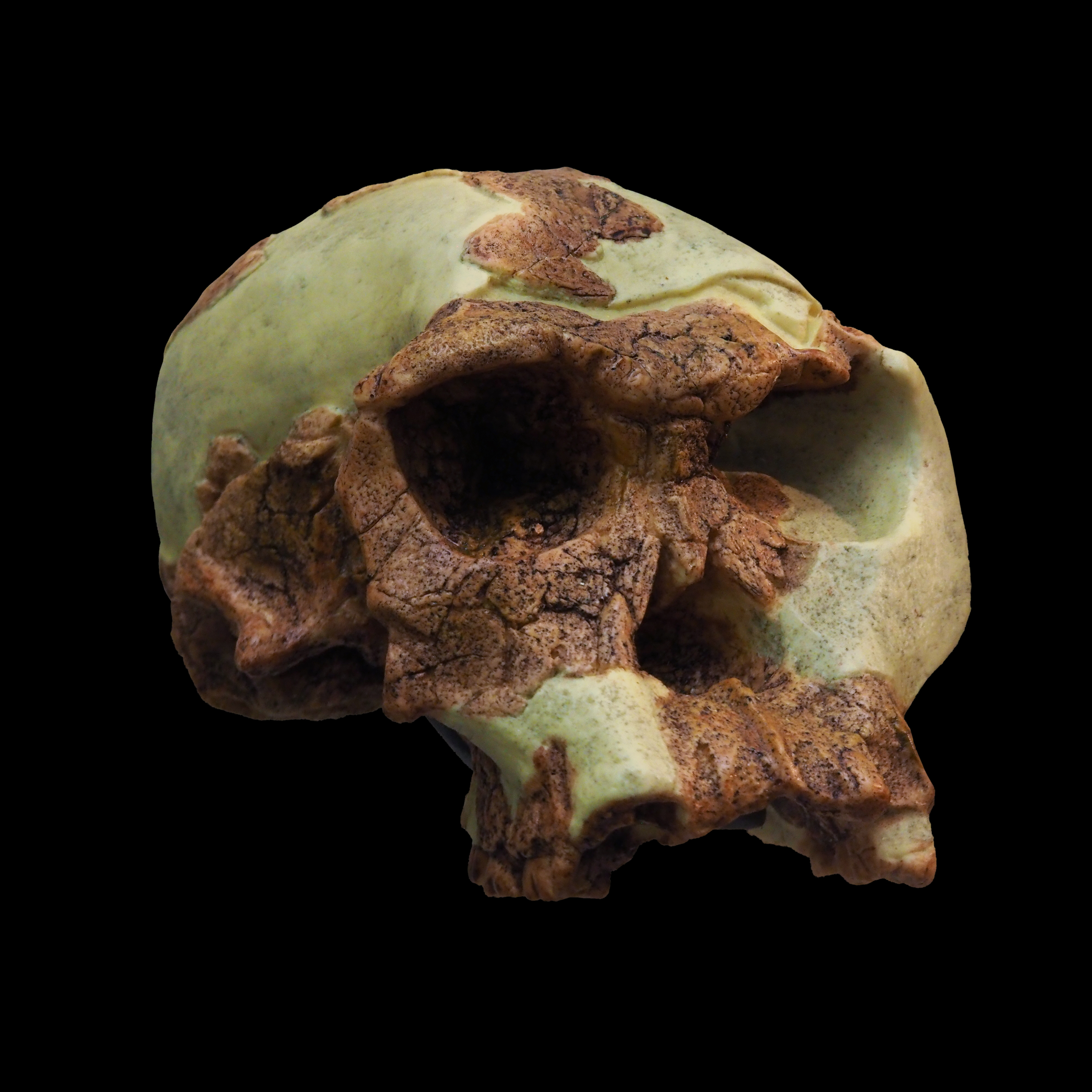
Twiggy was used to settle disputes

Being one of the oldest fossils of Homo habilis, OH 24 has been used to settle many disputes about splitting some of the early Homo fossils that have been found into Homo rudolfensis and Homo habilis, or lumping them together into one single species, Homo habilis. Some of the highly disputed fossils are KNM-ER 1813 which most agree is a female Homo habilis and KNM-ER 1470 which many argue has various anatomical differences to the previously known Homo habilis fossils that should make it be classified into the Homo rudolfensis species.

== Gallery ==
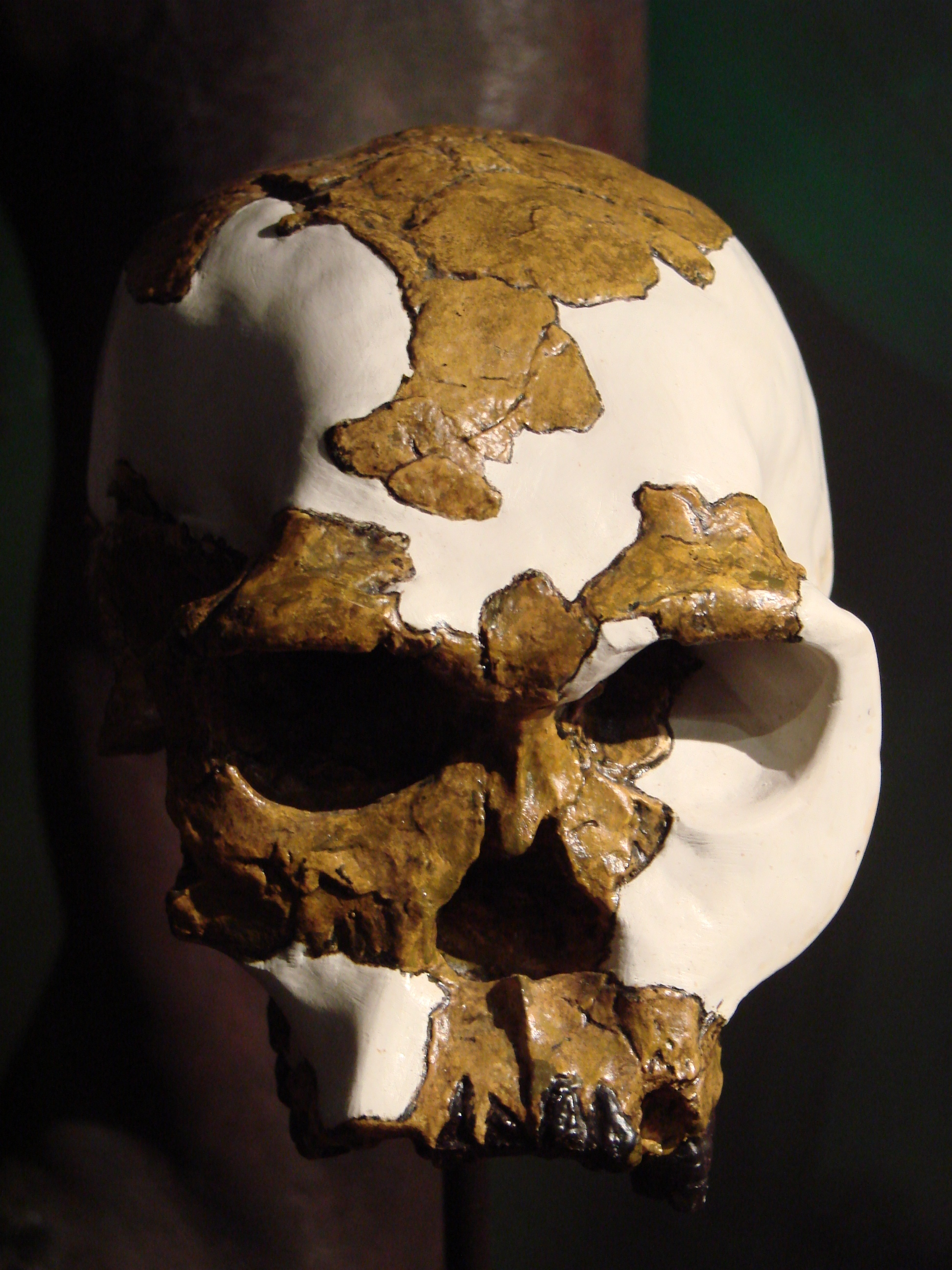
OH 24 features a cranium and some parts of the skull

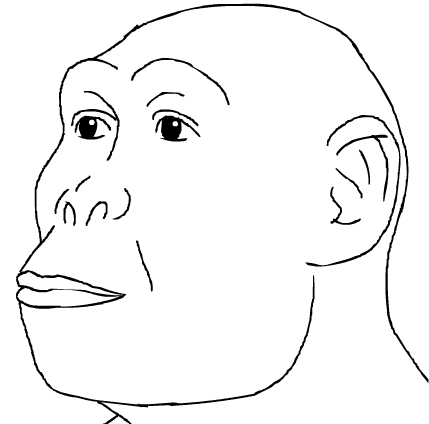
Possible appearance of Twiggy, in sketch.

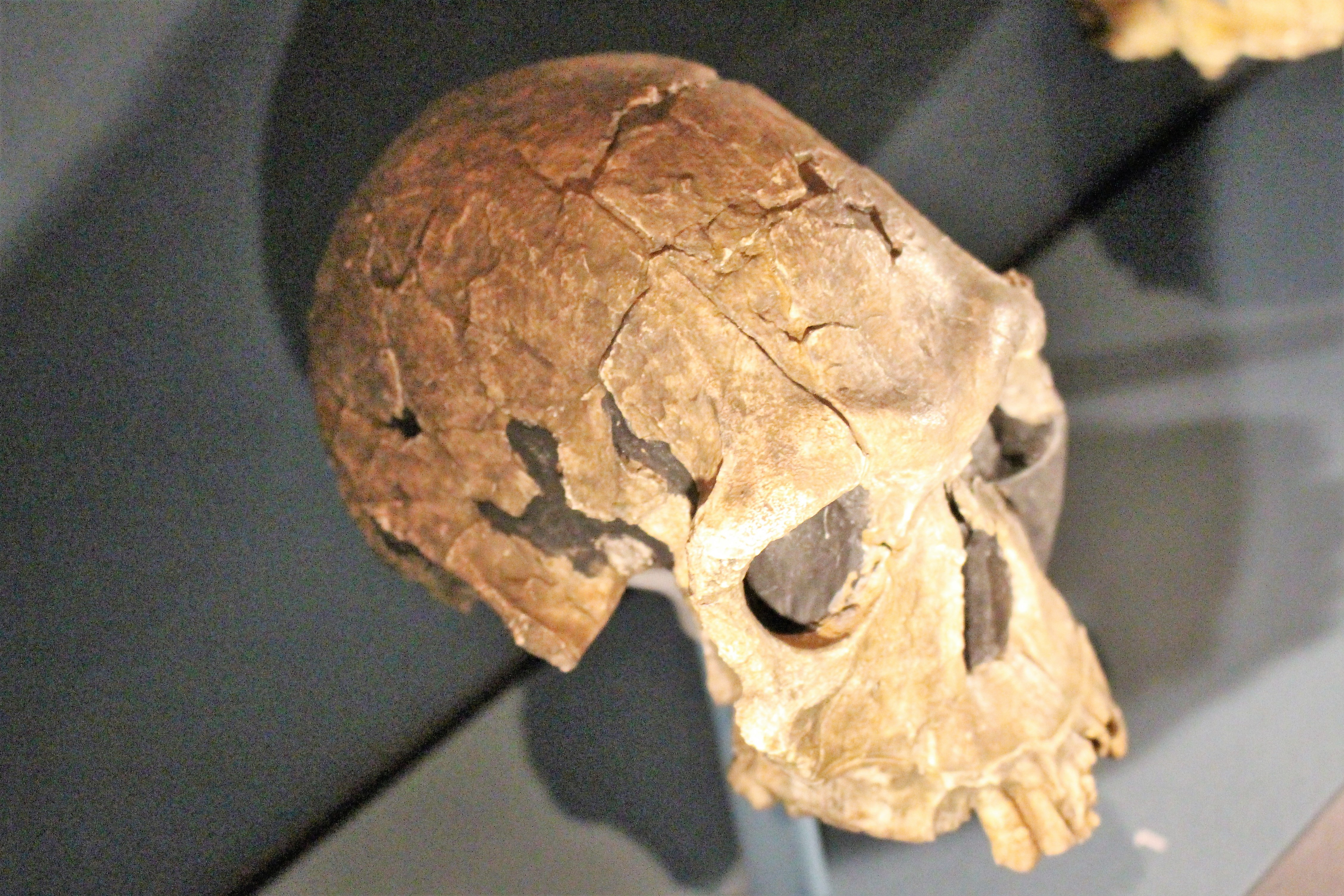
The skull of A Homo habilis

== See also ==
- List of fossil sites (with link directory)
- List of hominina (hominid) fossils (with images)
- KNM-ER 1813
- KNM-ER 1470
- OH 7
