= LD 350-1 =

Earliest known specimen of the genus Homo

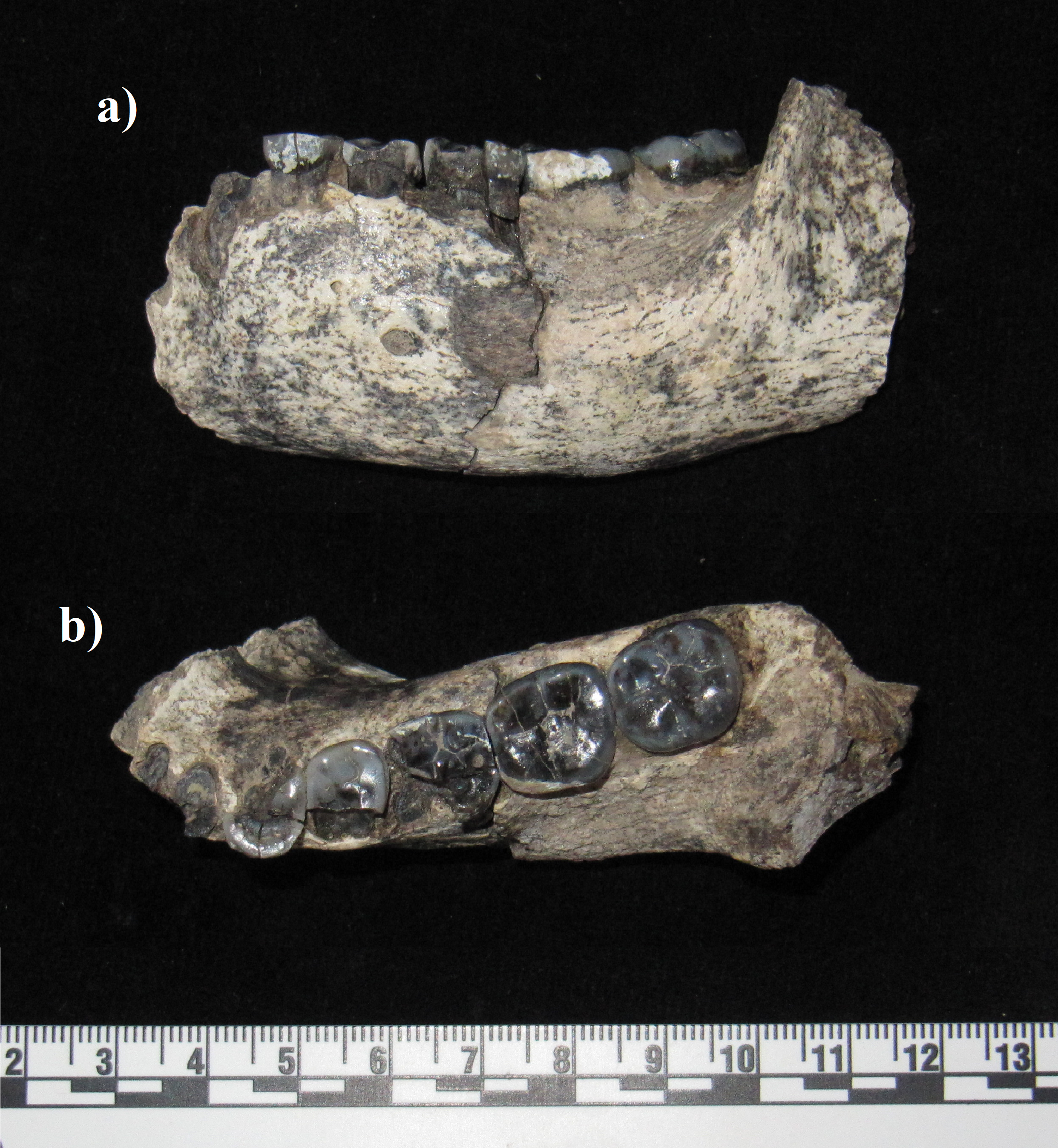
- LD-350-1 mandible
- Common name: LD 350-1
- Species: Homo, species uncertain
- Age: c. 2.775 million years
- Place discovered: Afar, Ethiopia
- Date discovered: 29 January 2013
- Discovered by: Chalachew Seyoum

LD 350-1 is the earliest known specimen of the genus Homo, dating to 2.75–2.8 million years ago (mya), found in the Ledi-Geraru site in the Afar Region of Ethiopia. The specimen was discovered in fossiliferous silts 10 m (33 ft) above the Gurumaha Tuff (Note: Light grey lapilli tuff dated to 2.782 ± 0.006 Ma) section of the site by Ethiopian palaeoanthropologist Chalachew Seyoum on 29 January 2013. It is currently unassigned to a species, and it is unclear if it represents the ancestor to H. habilis and H. rudolfensis which appear in the fossil record around 2.4 mya.

== Description ==
LD 350-1 is a partial adult left mandible including the canine, both premolars, and all three molars. In terms of overall size, the specimen is within the range of what is seen in small Australopithecus afarensis specimens, and LD 350-1 seems to be a transitional form between Australopithecus and Homo. However, the specimen's anatomy strongly diverges from australopithecines and more closely aligns with Homo: the mental foramina are not located on a depression, it has a symphyseal keel (a line of bone jutting out at the midline of the jaws), the jawbone maintains a more or less constant depth whereas it is deepest under the premolars in some Australopithecus, and there are several differences regarding the tooth crowns. This specimen confirms that Homo dental and jaw anatomy diverged from those of Australopithecus very early on. LD 350-1, like other archaic humans, seems to have lacked a distinct chin.

== Classification ==
The origin of Homo 2.8–2.5 mya is accompanied by climatic changes, but because other Homo specimens are not known from this time period, it is unclear if this was indeed the causal factor. Because of the strong dental divergence exhibited in LD 350-1, it may be that the initial split was caused by a change in diet. The KNM-ER 5431 specimen (comprising left and right premolars and the first two molars) from Koobi Fora, Kenya, dating to 3–2.7 mya could represent the same species as LD 350-1. The discovery of such an early Homo specimen discredits some past hypotheses on the timing of the Australopithecus/Homo transition, including deriving 2.6 mya from A. garhi. It is unclear if A. afarensis, which is known from the same region until 3 mya, was an ancestor of LD 350-1. However, subsequent studies have suggested that the specimen also shares characteristics with Australopithecus and that it is clearly distinct from H. habilis.

== Culture ==
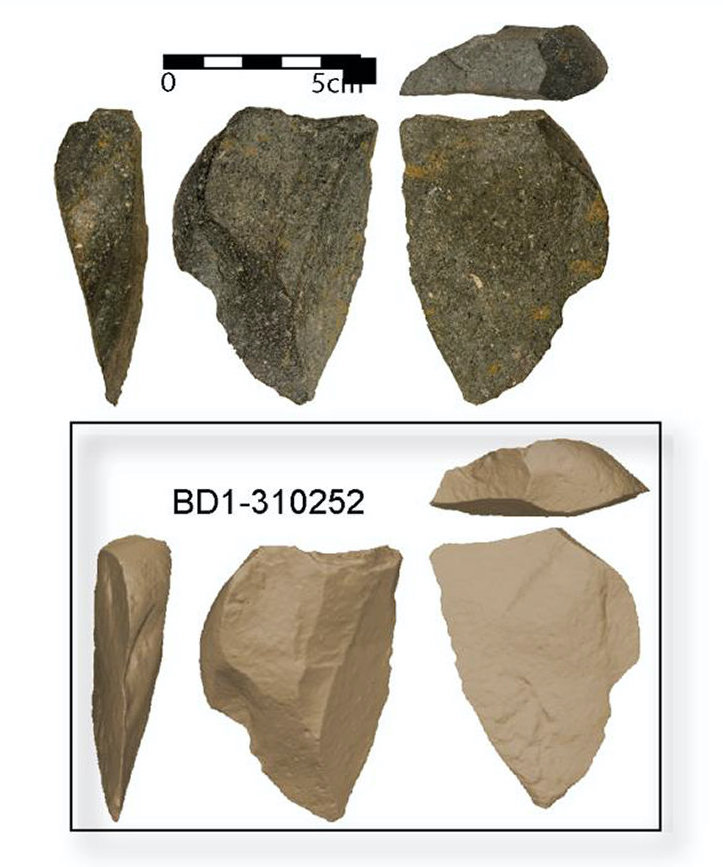
2.6 Ma Oldowan tools from Ledi-Geraru, Afar Region, Ethiopia

In 2019, the earliest Oldowan stone tools were discovered in Ledi-Geraru dating to 2.6 mya and may have been manufactured by the same species as LD 350-1. The invention of the sharp-edged Oldowan may be tied to unique biological changes in Homo. It is unclear if the Oldowan developed independently or from earlier, simpler australopithecine stone traditions (the only one identified is the Lomekwi industry). In either case, the transition to sharper tools would have allowed different feeding strategies and the ability to process a wider range of foods than australopithecine technology permitted, which would have been advantageous in the changing climate of the time.

LD 350-1 lived in a much drier and more open environment than A. afarensis typically inhabited. Given the abundance of grazing animals the area was likely similar to modern day African open grasslands, such as the Serengeti or the Kalahari; but the presence of Deinotherium bozasi (a browser) may indicate gallery forests; and Hippopotamus afarensis, crocodiles and fish indicate river and lake systems.

== See also ==
- List of human evolution fossils
- OH 7
