= KFRP =

KFRP may refer to:

- KFRP (FM), a defunct radio station (90.7 FM) formerly licensed to Coalinga, California, United States
- Koobi Fora Research Project, an archaeological project centered on the Koobi Fora Ridge near Lake Turkana in Kenya
