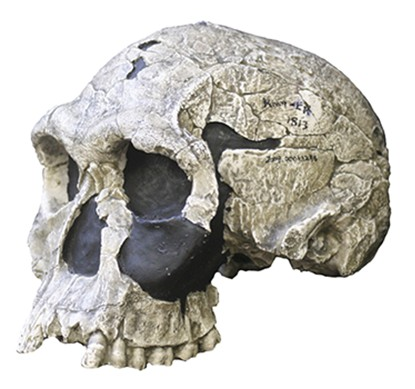
- Reconstruction of KNM-ER 1813 at the Naturmuseum Senckenberg, Germany

Scientific classification
- Kingdom: Animalia
- Phylum: Chordata
- Class: Mammalia
- Order: Primates
- Superfamily: Hominoidea
- Family: Hominidae
- Genus: Homo
- Species: †H. habilis

Binomial name
- †Homo habilis Leakey et al., 1964

Synonyms
- Australopithecus habilis Wood and Collard, 1999; Homo microcranous Ferguson, 1995; Homo gautengensis? Curnoe, 2010; Homo rudolfensis? Alexeev, 1986

= Homo habilis =

Homo habilis Temporal range: 2.3–1.65 Ma

Archaic human species from 2.4 to 1.65 mya

Homo habilis (lit. 'handy man') is an extinct species of archaic human from the Early Pleistocene of East and South Africa about 2.4 million years ago to 1.65 million years ago (mya). It is among the oldest species of archaic humans. Suggestions for pushing back the age to 2.8 Mya were made in 2015 based on the discovery of a jawbone. Upon species description in 1964, H. habilis was highly contested, with many researchers recommending it be synonymised with Australopithecus africanus, the only other early hominin known at the time, but H. habilis received more recognition as time went on and more relevant discoveries were made. By the 1980s, H. habilis was proposed to have been a human ancestor, directly evolving into Homo erectus, which directly led to modern humans. This viewpoint is now debated. Several specimens with insecure species identification were assigned to H. habilis, leading to arguments for splitting, namely into "H. rudolfensis" and "H. gautengensis" of which only the former has received wide support.

H. habilis brain size generally varied from 500 to 900 cm^{3} (31–55 cu in). The body proportions of H. habilis are only known from two highly fragmentary skeletons, and is based largely on assuming a similar anatomy to the earlier australopithecines. Because of this, it has also been proposed H. habilis be moved to the genus Australopithecus as Australopithecus habilis. However, the interpretation of H. habilis as a small-statured human with inefficient long-distance travel capabilities has been challenged. The presumed female specimen OH 62 is traditionally interpreted as having been 100–120 cm (3 ft 3 in – 3 ft 11 in) in height and 20–37 kg (44–82 lb) in weight assuming australopithecine-like proportions, but assuming humanlike proportions she would have been about 148 cm (4 ft 10 in) and 35 kg (77 lb). Nonetheless, Homo habilis may have been at least partially arboreal like what is postulated for australopithecines. Early hominins are typically reconstructed as having thick hair and marked sexual dimorphism with males much larger than females, though relative male and female size is not definitively known.

H. habilis manufactured the Oldowan stone tool industry and mainly used tools in butchering. Early Homo, compared to australopithecines, are generally thought to have consumed high quantities of meat and, in the case of H. habilis, scavenged meat. Typically, early hominins are interpreted as having lived in polygynous societies, though this is highly speculative. Assuming H. habilis society was similar to that of modern savanna chimpanzees and baboons, groups may have numbered 70–85 members. This configuration would be advantageous with multiple males to defend against open savanna predators, such as big cats, hyenas and crocodiles. H. habilis coexisted with H. rudolfensis, H. ergaster / H. erectus and Paranthropus boisei.

== Taxonomy ==
=== Research history ===
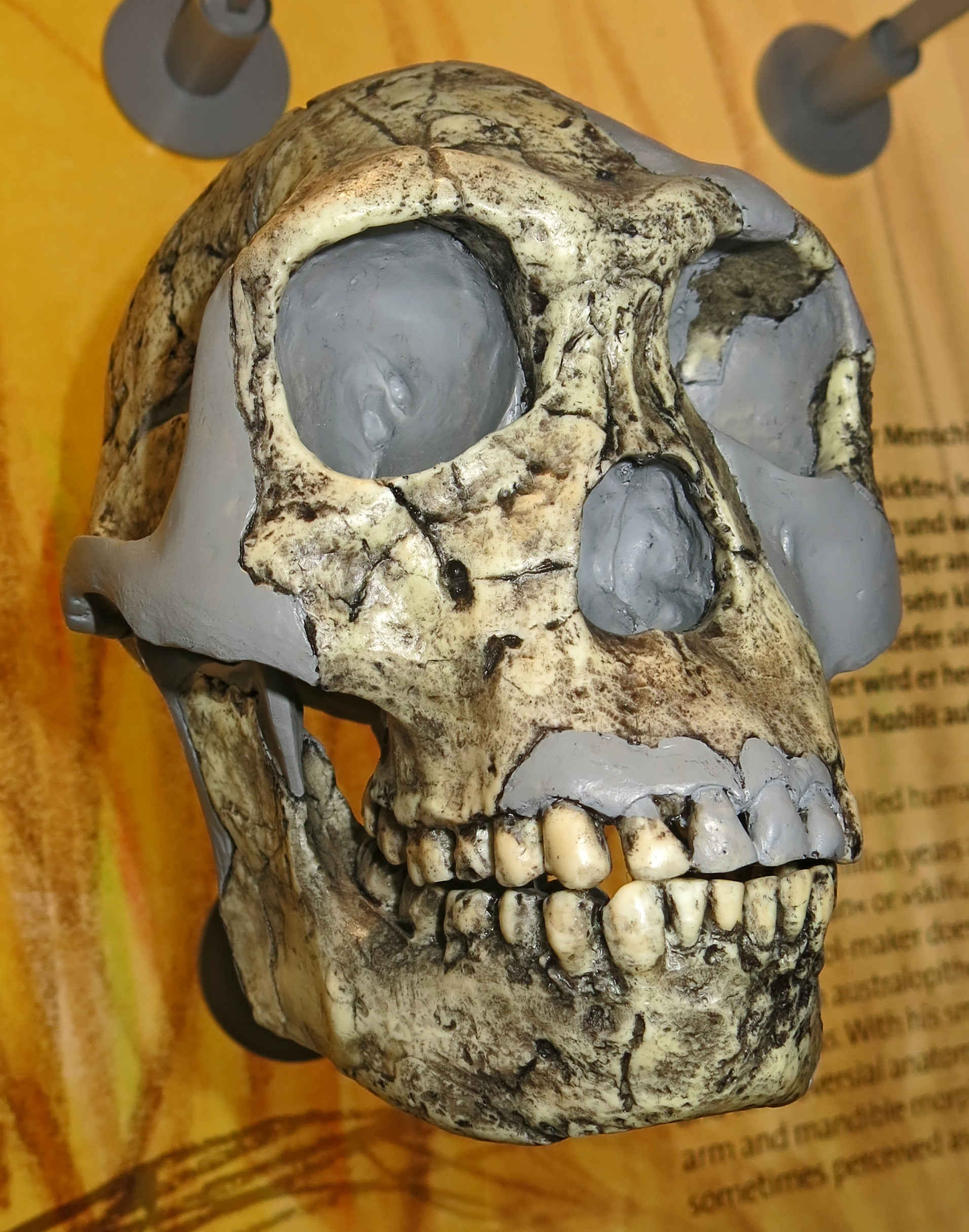
KNM-ER 1813 reconstructed skull and jaw

The first recognised remains—OH 7, partial juvenile skull, hand, and foot bones dating to 1.75 million years ago (mya)—were discovered in Olduvai Gorge, Tanzania, in 1960 by Jonathan Leakey, with other native Africans who dug into Olduvai Gorge, and who worked for Jonathan Leakey. However, the actual first remains—OH 4, a molar—were discovered by the senior assistant of Louis and Mary Leakey (Jonathan's parents), Heselon Mukiri, other native Africans, in 1959, but this was not realised at the time. By this time, the Leakeys had spent 29 years excavating in Olduvai Gorge for early hominin remains, but had instead recovered mainly other animal remains as well as the Oldowan stone-tool industry. The industry had been ascribed to Paranthropus boisei (at the time "Zinjanthropus") in 1959 as it was the first and only hominin recovered in the area, but this was revised upon OH 7's discovery. In 1964, Louis, South African palaeoanthropologist Phillip V. Tobias, and British primatologist John R. Napier officially assigned the remains into the genus Homo, and, on recommendation by Australian anthropologist Raymond Dart, the specific name H. habilis, meaning "able, handy, mentally skillful, vigorous" in Latin. The specimen's association with the Oldowan (then considered evidence of advanced cognitive ability) was also used as justification for classifying it into Homo. OH 7 was designated the holotype specimen.

After description, it was hotly debated if H. habilis should be reclassified into Australopithecus africanus (the only other early hominin known at the time), in part because the remains were so old and at the time Homo was presumed to have evolved in Asia (with the australopithecines having no living descendants). Also, the brain size was smaller than what Wilfrid Le Gros Clark proposed in 1955 when considering Homo. The classification H. habilis began to receive wider acceptance as more fossil elements and species were unearthed. In 1983, Tobias proposed that A. africanus was a direct ancestor of Paranthropus and Homo (the two were sister taxa), and that A. africanus evolved into H. habilis which evolved into H. erectus which evolved into modern humans (by a process of cladogenesis). He further said that there was a major evolutionary leap between A. africanus and H. habilis, and thereupon human evolution progressed gradually because H. habilis brain size had nearly doubled compared to australopithecine predecessors.

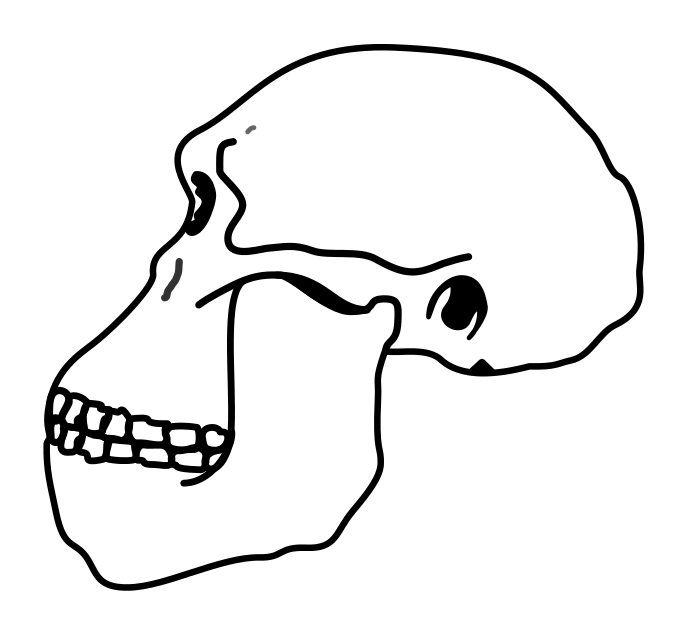
Australopithecus

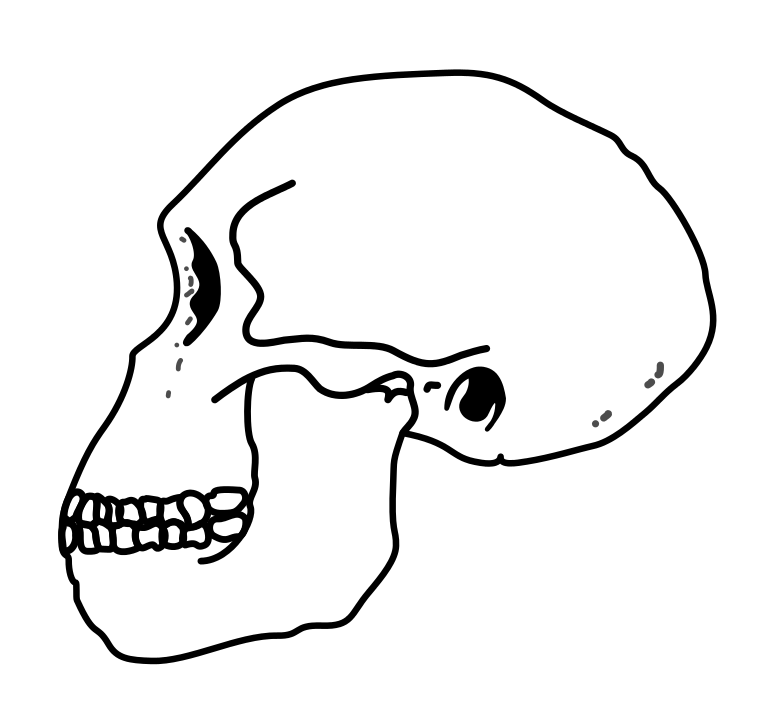
H. habilis

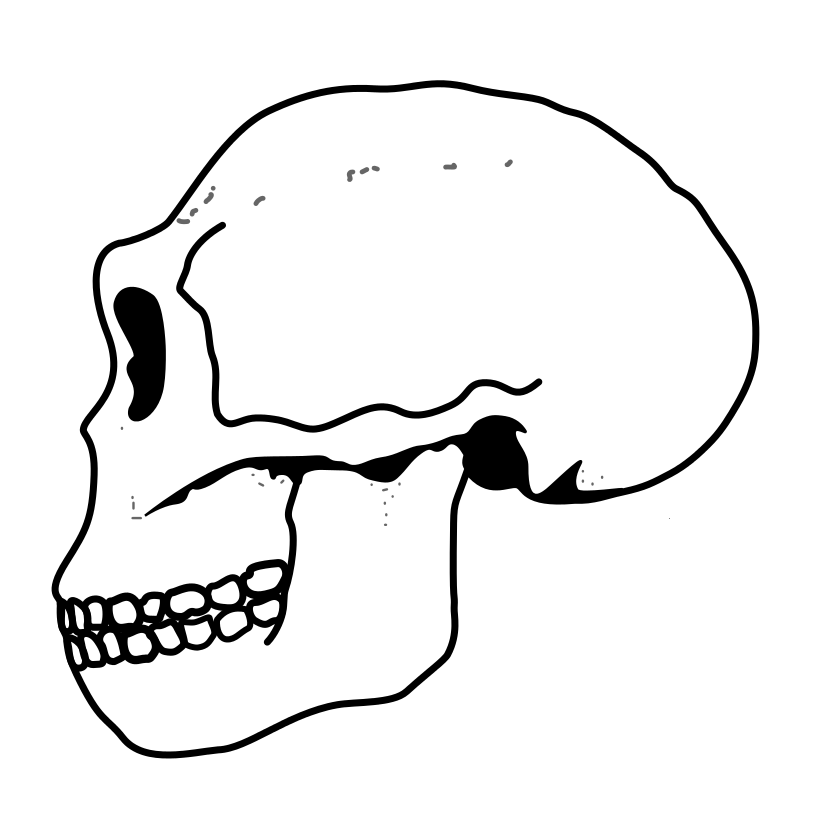
H. ergaster
H. erectus

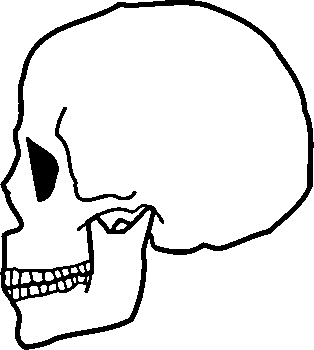
H. sapiens

Human evolution according to Tobias, 1983

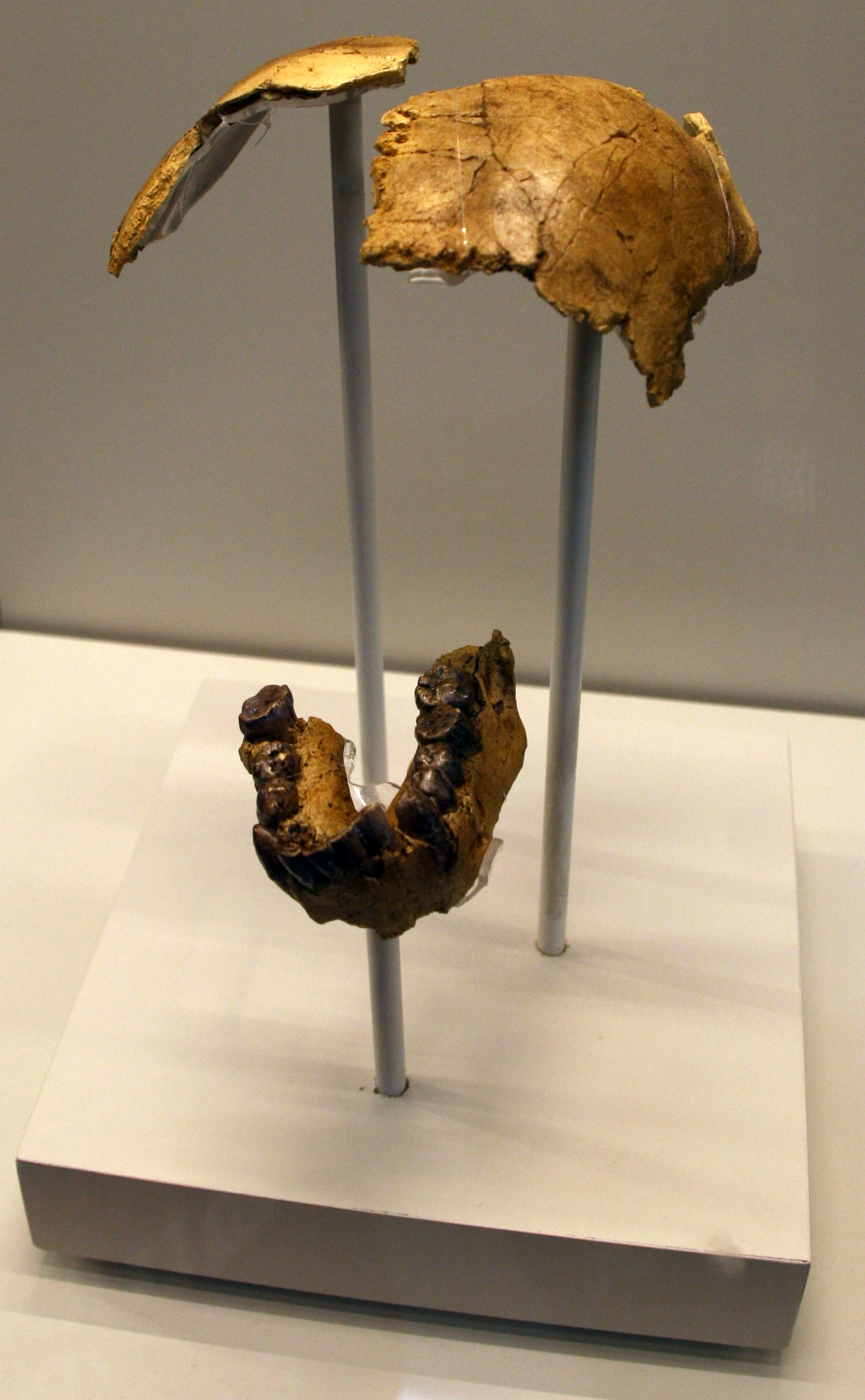
Cast of the type specimen OH 7

Many had accepted Tobias' model and assigned Late Pliocene to Early Pleistocene hominin remains outside the range of Paranthropus and H. erectus into H. habilis. For non-skull elements, this was done on the basis of size as there was a lack of clear diagnostic characteristics. Because of these practices, the range of variation for the species became quite wide, and the terms H. habilis sensu stricto (i.e. strictly) and H. habilis sensu lato (i.e. broadly) were in use to exclude and include, respectively, more discrepant morphs. To address this controversy, English palaeoanthropologist Bernard Wood proposed in 1985, that the comparatively massive skull KNM-ER 1470 from Lake Turkana, Kenya, discovered in 1972 and assigned to H. habilis, actually represented a different species, now referred to as Homo rudolfensis. It is also argued that instead it represents a male specimen whereas other H. habilis specimens are female. Early Homo from South Africa have variously been assigned to H. habilis or H. ergaster / H. erectus, but species designation has largely been unclear. In 2010, Australian archaeologist Darren Curoe proposed splitting off South African early Homo into a new species, "Homo gautengensis".

In 1986, OH 62, a fragmentary skeleton was discovered by American anthropologist Tim D. White in association with H. habilis skull fragments, definitively establishing aspects of H. habilis skeletal anatomy for the first time, and revealing more Australopithecus-like than Homo-like features. Because of this, as well as similarities in dental adaptations, Wood and biological anthropologist Mark Collard suggested moving the species to Australopithecus in 1999. However, reevaluation of OH 62 to a more humanlike physiology, if correct, would cast doubt on this. The discovery of the 1.8 Ma Georgian Dmanisi skulls in the early 2000s, which exhibit several similarities with early Homo, has led to suggestions that all contemporary groups of early Homo in Africa, including H. habilis and H. rudolfensis, are the same species and should be assigned to H. erectus.

=== Classification ===
- - - H. habilis
    - H. rudolfensis
  - - H. ergaster
    - - H. erectus
      - - H. antecessor
        - - - H. heidelbergensis
            - H. neanderthalensis
          - H. sapiens

Homo family tree showing H. habilis and H. rudolfensis at the base as offshoots of the human line

There is still no wide consensus as to whether or not H. habilis is ancestral to H. ergaster / H. erectus or is an offshoot of the human line, and whether or not all specimens assigned to H. habilis are correctly assigned or the species is an assemblage of different Australopithecus and Homo species. Studies of the dental morphology of H. habilis have suggested that it shares greater similarity with Australopithecus than with later Homo species. Nonetheless, H. habilis and H. rudolfensis are generally recognised members of the genus at the base of the family tree, with arguments for synonymisation or removal from the genus not widely adopted.

Though it is now largely agreed upon that Homo evolved from Australopithecus, the timing and placement of this split has been much debated, with many Australopithecus species having been proposed as the ancestor. The discovery of LD 350-1, the oldest Homo specimen, dating to 2.8 mya, in the Afar Region of Ethiopia may indicate that the genus evolved from A. afarensis around this time. This specimen was initially classified as Homo sp., though subsequent studies have suggested that it also shares characteristics with Australopithecus and that it is clearly distinct from H. habilis. The oldest H. habilis specimen, A.L. 666-1, dates to 2.3 mya, but is anatomically more derived (has less ancestral, or basal, traits) than the younger OH 7, suggesting derived and basal morphs lived concurrently, and that the H. habilis lineage began before 2.3 mya. Based on 2.1-million-year-old stone tools from Shangchen, China, H. habilis or an ancestral species may have dispersed across Asia. The youngest H. habilis specimen, OH 13, dates to about 1.65 mya.

African Hominin timeline

== Anatomy ==
=== Skull ===
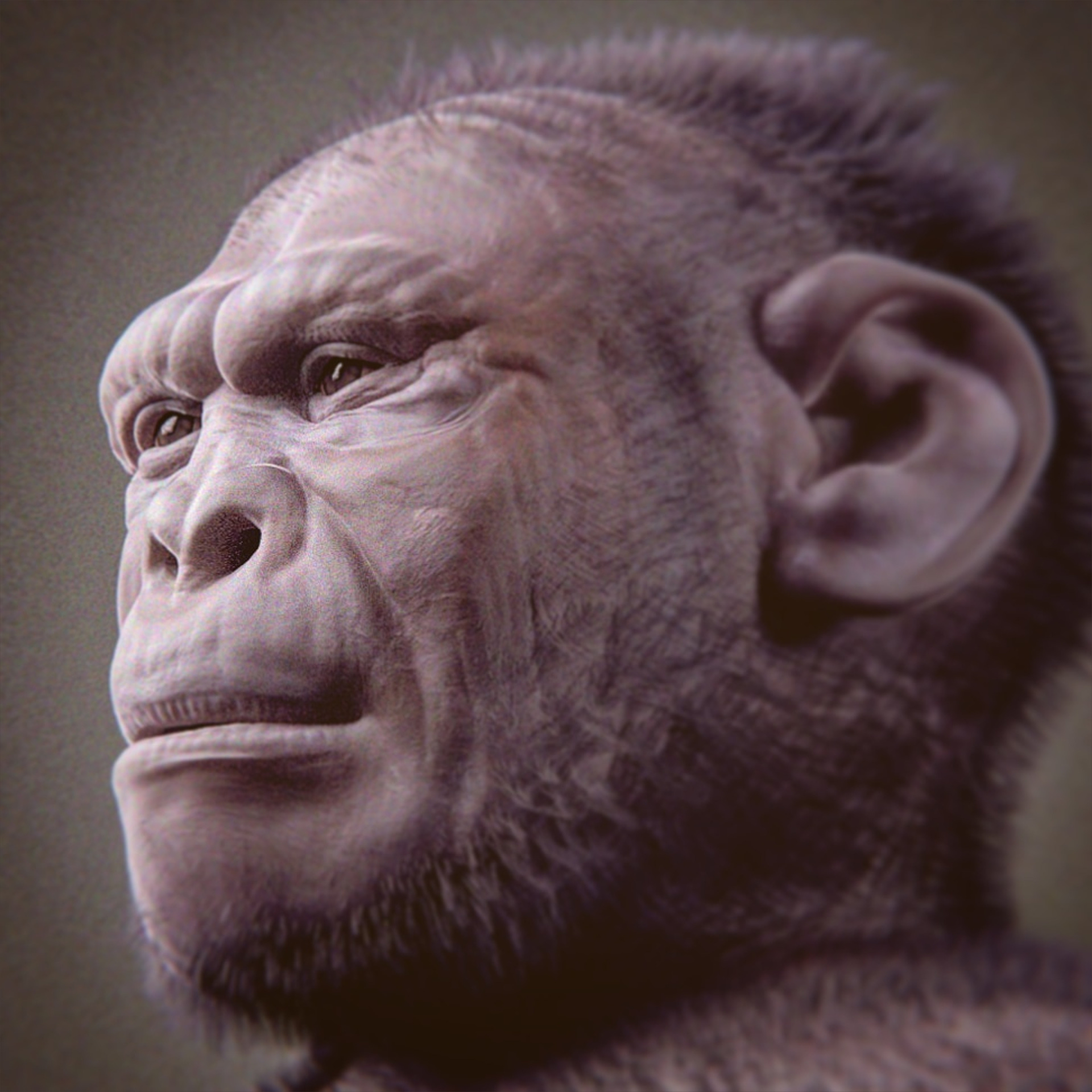
Homo habilis – forensic facial reconstruction

It has generally been thought that brain size increased along the human line especially rapidly at the transition between species, with H. habilis brain size smaller than that of H. ergaster / H. erectus, jumping from about 600–650 cc (37–40 cu in) in H. habilis to about 900–1,000 cc (55–61 cu in) in H. ergaster and H. erectus. However, a 2015 study showed that the brain sizes of H. habilis, H. rudolfensis, and H. ergaster generally ranged between 500–900 cc (31–55 cu in) after reappraising the brain volume of OH 7 from 647–687 cc (39.5–41.9 cu in) to 729–824 cc (44.5–50.3 cu in). This does, nonetheless, indicate a jump from australopithecine brain size which generally ranged from 400–500 cc (24–31 cu in).

Hominin timeline
← / Earlier apes; ← / Gorilla split; ← / Chimpanzee split; ← / Earliest bipedal; ← / Earliest sign of Ardipithecus; ← / Earliest sign of Australopithecus; ← / Earliest stone tools; ← / Earliest sign of Homo; ← / Dispersal beyond Africa; ← / Earliest fire / cooking; ← / Earliest rock art; ← / Earliest clothes; ← / Modern humans
(million years ago)

The brain anatomy of all Homo features an expanded cerebrum in comparison to australopithecines. The pattern of striations on the teeth of OH 65 slant right, which may have been accidentally self-inflicted when the individual was pulling a piece of meat with its teeth and the left hand while trying to cut it with a stone tool using the right hand. If correct, this could indicate right handedness, and handedness is associated with major reorganisation of the brain and the lateralisation of brain function between the left and right hemispheres. This scenario has also been hypothesised for some Neanderthal specimens. Lateralisation could be implicated in tool use. In modern humans, lateralisation is weakly associated with language.

The tooth rows of H. habilis were V-shaped as opposed to U-shaped in later Homo, and the mouth jutted outwards (was prognathic), though the face was flat from the nose up.

=== Build ===
Based on the fragmentary skeletons OH 62 (presumed female) and KNM-ER 3735 (presumed male), H. habilis body anatomy has generally been considered to have been more apelike than even that of the earlier A. afarensis; this is consistent with an at least partially arboreal lifestyle in the trees as is assumed in australopithecines. Based on OH 62 and assuming comparable body dimensions to australopithecines, H. habilis has generally been interpreted as having been small-bodied like australopithecines, with OH 62 generally estimated at 100–120 cm (3 ft 3 in – 3 ft 11 in) in height and 20–37 kg (44–82 lb) in weight. However, assuming longer, modern humanlike legs, OH 62 would have been about 148 cm (4 ft 10 in) and 35 kg (77 lb), and KNM-ER 3735 about the same size. For comparison, modern human men and women in the year 1900 averaged 163 cm (5 ft 4 in) and 152.7 cm (5 ft 0 in), respectively. It is generally assumed that pre-H. ergaster hominins, including H. habilis, exhibited notable sexual dimorphism with males markedly bigger than females. However, relative female body mass is unknown in this species.

Early hominins, including H. habilis, are thought to have had thick body hair coverage like modern non-human apes because they appear to have inhabited colder regions and are thought to have had a less active lifestyle than (presumed hairless) post-ergaster species. Consequently, they probably required thick body hair to stay warm. Based on dental development rates, H. habilis is assumed to have had an accelerated growth rate compared to modern humans, more like that of modern non-human apes.

=== Limbs ===
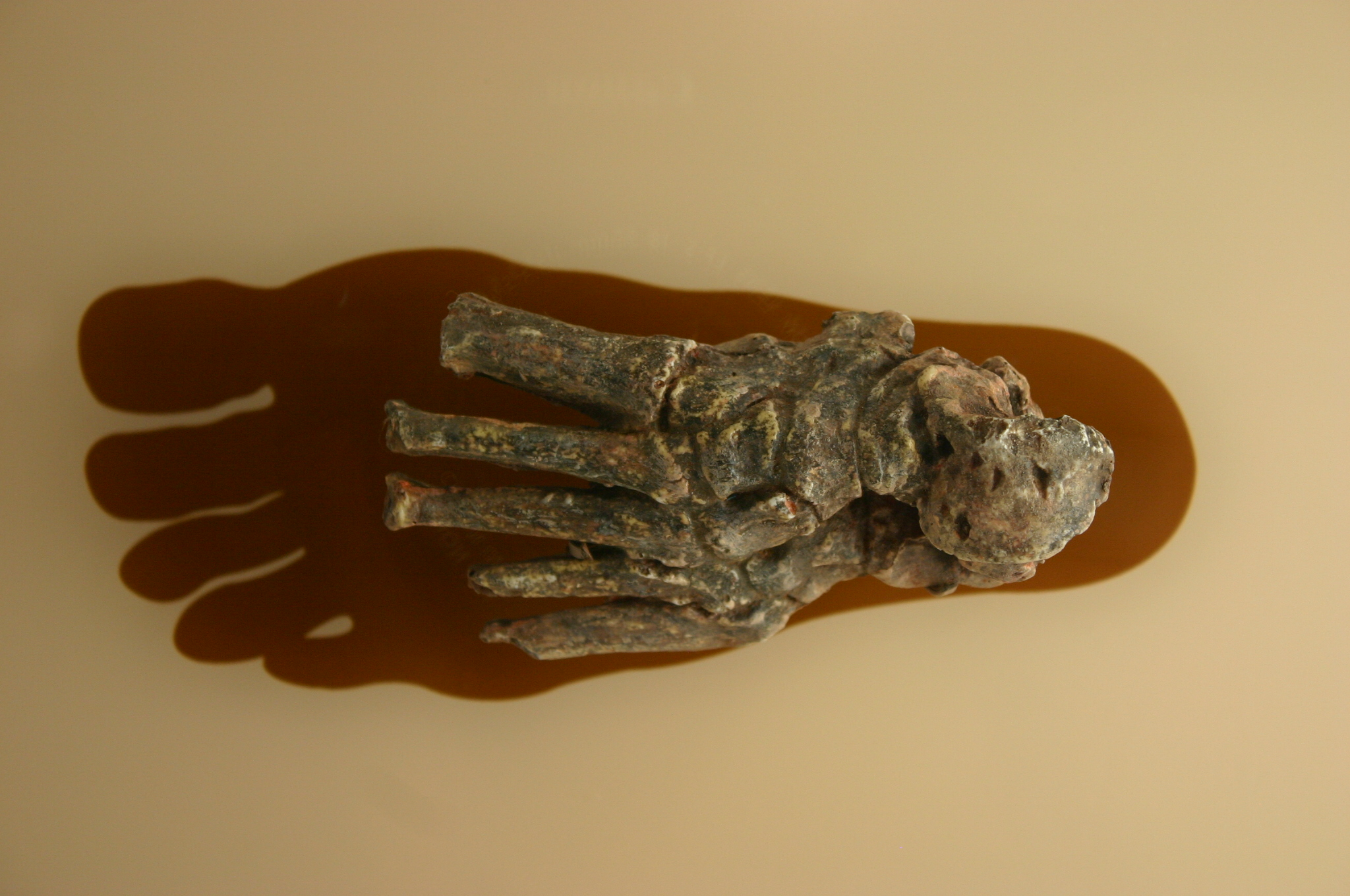
OH 8, bearing crocodile tooth marks

The arms of H. habilis and australopithecines have generally been considered to have been proportionally long and so adapted for climbing and swinging. In 2004, anthropologists Martin Haeusler and Henry McHenry argued that, because the humerus to femur ratio of OH 62 is within the range of variation for modern humans, and KNM-ER 3735 is close to the modern human average, it is unsafe to assume apelike proportions. Nonetheless, the humerus of OH 62 measured 258–270 mm (10.2–10.6 in) long and the ulna (forearm) 245–255 mm (9.6–10.0 in), which is closer to the proportion seen in chimpanzees. The hand bones of OH 7 suggest precision gripping, important in dexterity, as well as adaptations for climbing. In regard to the femur, traditionally comparisons with the A. afarensis specimen AL 288-1 have been used to reconstruct stout legs for H. habilis, but Haeusler and McHenry suggested the more gracile OH 24 femur (either belonging to H. ergaster / H. erectus or P. boisei) may be a more apt comparison. In this instance, H. habilis would have had longer, humanlike legs and have been effective long-distance travellers as is assumed to have been the case in H. ergaster. However, estimating the unpreserved length of a fossil is highly problematic. The thickness of the limb bones in OH 62 is more similar to chimpanzees than H. ergaster / H. erectus and modern humans, which may indicate different load bearing capabilities more suitable for arboreality in H. habilis. The strong fibula of OH 35 (though this may belong to P. boisei) is more like that of non-human apes, and consistent with arboreality and vertical climbing.

OH 8, a foot, is better suited for terrestrial movement than the foot of A. afarensis, though it still retains many apelike features consistent with climbing. However, the foot has projected toe bone and compacted mid-foot joint structures, which restrict rotation between the foot and ankle as well as at the front foot. Foot stability enhances the efficiency of force transfer between the leg and the foot and vice versa, and is implicated in the plantar arch elastic spring mechanism which generates energy while running (but not walking). This could possibly indicate H. habilis was capable of some degree of endurance running, which is typically thought to have evolved later in H. ergaster / H. erectus.

== Culture ==
=== Society ===
Typically, H. ergaster / H. erectus is considered to have been the first human to have lived in a monogamous society, and all preceding hominins were polygynous. However, it is highly difficult to speculate with any confidence the group dynamics of early hominins. The degree of sexual dimorphism and the size disparity between males and females is often used to correlate between polygyny with high disparity and monogamy with low disparity based on general trends (though not without exceptions) seen in modern primates. Rates of sexual dimorphism are difficult to determine as early hominin anatomy is poorly represented in the fossil record. In some cases, sex is arbitrarily determined in large part based on perceived size and apparent robustness in the absence of more reliable elements in sex identification (namely the pelvis). Mating systems are also based on dental anatomy, but early hominins possess a mosaic anatomy of different traits not seen together in modern primates; the enlarged cheek teeth would suggest marked size-related dimorphism and thus intense male–male conflict over mates and a polygynous society, but the small canines should indicate the opposite. Other selective pressures, including diet, can also dramatically impact dental anatomy. The spatial distribution of tools and processed animal bones at the FLK Zinj and PTK sites in Olduvai Gorge indicate the inhabitants used this area as a communal butchering and eating grounds, as opposed to the nuclear family system of modern hunter gatherers where the group is subdivided into smaller units each with their own butchering and eating grounds.

The behaviour of early Homo, including H. habilis, is sometimes modelled on that of savanna chimps and baboons. These communities consist of several males (as opposed to a harem society) in order to defend the group on the dangerous and exposed habitat, sometimes engaging in a group display of throwing sticks and stones against enemies and predators. The left foot OH 8 seems to have been bitten off by a crocodile, possibly Crocodylus anthropophagus, and the leg OH 35, which either belongs to P. boisei or H. habilis, shows evidence of leopard predation. H. habilis and contemporary hominins were likely predated upon by other large carnivores of the time, such as (in Olduvai Gorge) the hunting hyena Chasmaporthetes nitidula, and the saber-toothed cats Dinofelis and Megantereon. In 1993, American palaeoanthropologist Leslie C. Aiello and British evolutionary psychologist Robin Dunbar estimated that H. habilis group size ranged from 70–85 members—on the upper end of chimp and baboon group size—based on trends seen in neocortex size and group size in modern non-human primates.

H. habilis coexisted with H. rudolfensis, H. ergaster / H. erectus, and P. boisei. It is unclear how all of these species interacted. To explain why P. boisei was associated with Olduwan tools despite not being the knapper (the one who made the tools), Leakey and colleagues, when describing H. habilis, suggested the possibility that P. boisei was killed by H. habilis, perhaps as food. However, when describing P. boisei five years earlier, Louis Leakey said, "There is no reason whatever, in this case, to believe that the skull represents the victim of a cannibalistic feast by some hypothetical more advanced type of man."

=== Diet ===
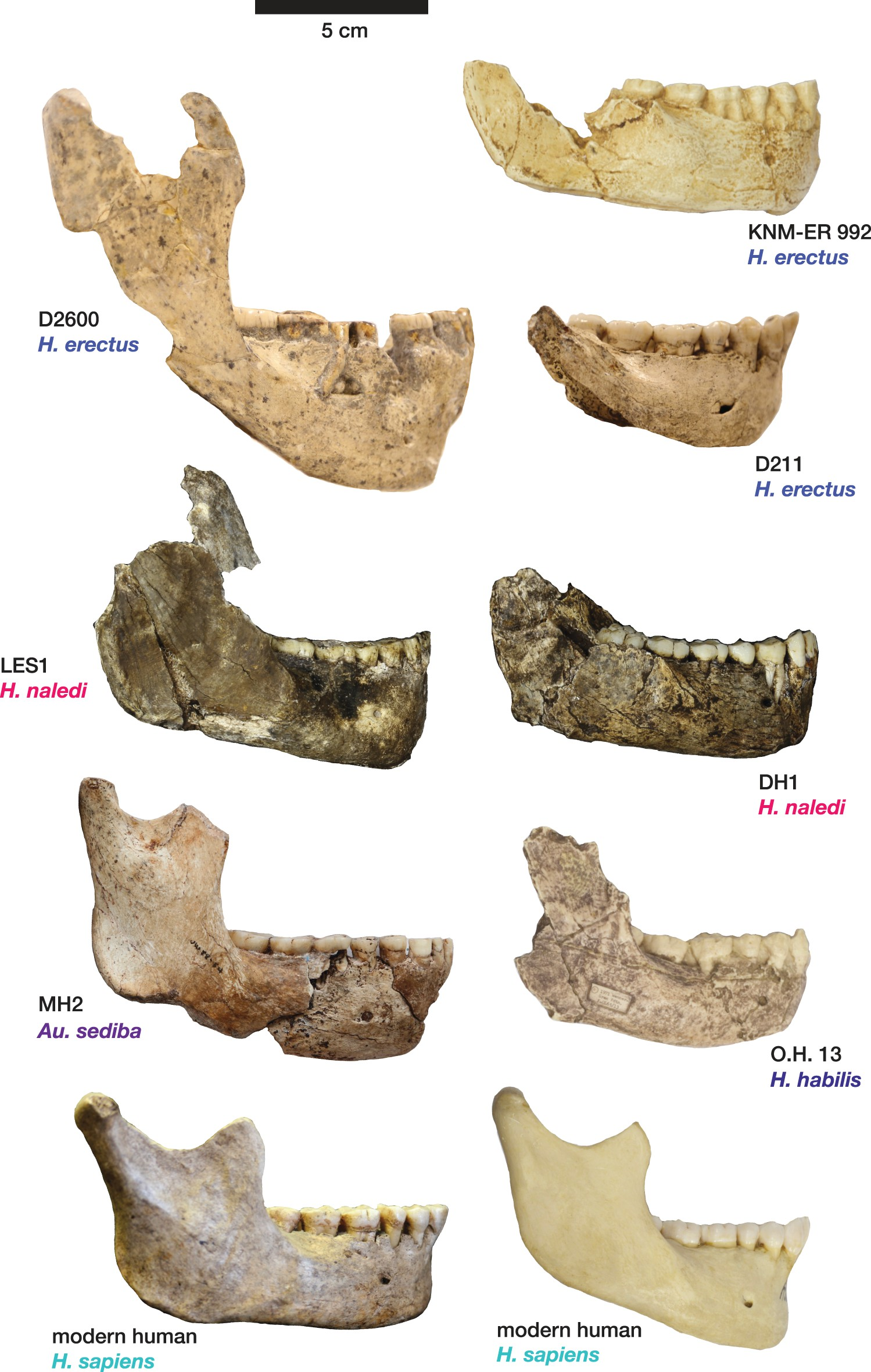
OH 13 mandible compared to other hominin species

It is thought H. habilis derived meat from scavenging rather than hunting (scavenger hypothesis), acting as a confrontational scavenger and stealing kills from smaller predators such as jackals or cheetahs. Fruit was likely also an important dietary component, indicated by dental erosion consistent with repetitive exposure to acidity. Based on dental microwear-texture analysis, H. habilis (like other early Homo) likely did not regularly consume tough foods. Microwear-texture complexity is, on average, somewhere between that of tough-food eaters and leaf eaters (folivores), and points to an increasingly generalised and omnivorous diet. Freshwater fish likely were also consumed, evidenced by the findings of fish remains at archaeological sites most likely associated with H. habilis.

It is typically thought that the diets of H. habilis and other early Homo had a greater proportion of meat than Australopithecus, and that this led to brain growth. The main hypotheses regarding this are: meat is energy- and nutrient-rich and put evolutionary pressure on developing enhanced cognitive skills to facilitate strategic scavenging and monopolise fresh carcasses, or meat allowed the large and calorie-expensive ape gut to decrease in size allowing this energy to be diverted to brain growth. Alternatively, it is also suggested that early Homo, in a drying climate with scarcer food options, relied primarily on underground storage organs (such as tubers) and food sharing, which facilitated social bonding among both male and female group members. However, unlike what is presumed for H. ergaster and later Homo, short-statured early Homo are generally considered to have been incapable of endurance running and hunting, and the long and Australopithecus-like forearm of H. habilis could indicate early Homo were still arboreal to a degree. Also, organised hunting and gathering is thought to have emerged in H. ergaster. Nonetheless, the proposed food-gathering models to explain large brain growth necessitate increased daily travel distance. It has also been argued that H. habilis instead had long, modern humanlike legs and was fully capable of effective long distance travel, while still remaining at least partially arboreal.

Large incisor size in H. habilis compared to Australopithecus predecessors implies this species relied on incisors more. The bodies of the mandibles of H. habilis and other early Homo are thicker than those of modern humans and all living apes, more comparable to Australopithecus. The mandibular body resists torsion from the bite force or chewing, meaning their jaws could produce unusually powerful stresses while eating. The greater molar cusp relief in H. habilis compared to Australopithecus suggests the former used tools to fracture tough foods (such as pliable plant parts or meat), otherwise the cusps would have been more worn down. Nonetheless, the jaw adaptations for processing mechanically challenging food indicates technological advancement did not greatly affect diet.

=== Technology ===
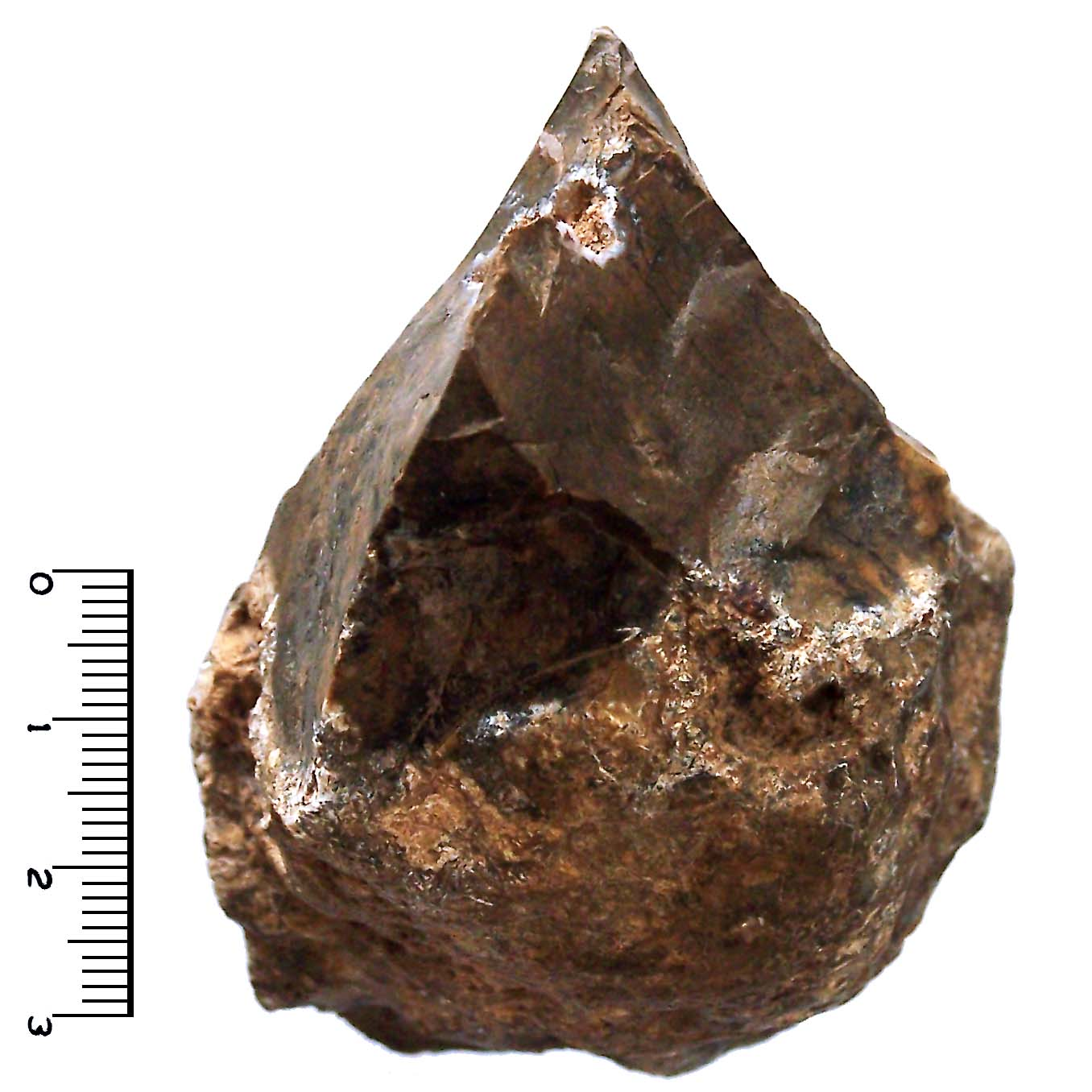
Oldowan chopper

H. habilis is associated with the Early Stone Age Oldowan stone tool industry. Individuals likely used these tools primarily to butcher and skin animals and crush bones, but also sometimes to saw and scrape wood and cut soft plants. Knappers – individuals shaping stones – appear to have carefully selected lithic cores and knew that certain rocks would break in a specific way when struck hard enough and on the right spot, and they produced several different types, including choppers, polyhedrons, and discoids. Nonetheless, specific shapes were likely not thought of in advance, and probably stem from a lack of standardisation in producing such tools as well as the types of raw materials at the knappers' disposal. For example, spheroids are common at Olduvai, which features an abundance of large and soft quartz and quartzite pieces, whereas Koobi Fora lacks spheroids and provides predominantly hard basalt lava rocks. Unlike the later Acheulean culture invented by H. ergaster / H. erectus, Oldowan technology does not require planning and foresight to manufacture, and thus does not indicate high cognition in Oldowan knappers, though it does require a degree of coordination and some knowledge of mechanics. Oldowan tools infrequently exhibit retouching and were probably discarded immediately after use most of the time.

The Oldowan was first reported in 1934, but it was not until the 1960s that it become widely accepted as the earliest culture, dating to 1.8 mya, and as having been manufactured by H. habilis. Since then, more discoveries have placed the origins of material culture substantially backwards in time, with the Oldowan being discovered in Ledi-Geraru and Gona in Ethiopia dating to 2.6 mya, perhaps associated with the evolution of the genus. Australopithecines are also known to have manufactured tools, such as the 3.3 Ma Lomekwi stone tool industry, and some evidence of butchering from about 3.4 mya. Nonetheless, the comparatively sharp-edged Oldowan culture was a major innovation from australopithecine technology, and it would have allowed different feeding strategies and the ability to process a wider range of foods, which would have been advantageous in the changing climate of the time. It is unclear if the Oldowan was independently invented or if it was the result of hominin experimentation with rocks over hundreds of thousands of years across multiple species.

In 1962, a 366 cm × 427 cm × 30 cm (12 ft × 14 ft × 1 ft) circle made with volcanic rocks was discovered in Olduvai Gorge. At 61–76 cm (2–2.5 ft) intervals, rocks were piled up to 15–23 cm (6–9 in) high. Mary Leakey suggested the rock piles were used to support poles stuck into the ground, possibly to support a windbreak or a rough hut. Some modern-day nomadic tribes build similar low-lying rock walls to build temporary shelters upon, bending upright branches as poles and using grasses or animal hide as a screen. Dating to 1.75 mya, it is attributed to some early Homo, and is the oldest-claimed evidence of architecture.

== See also ==
- African archaeology
- Australopithecus africanus – Extinct hominid from South Africa
- Australopithecus sediba – Extinct hominin from South Africa
- Homo ergaster – Extinct species or subspecies of archaic human
- Homo gautengensis – Name proposed for an extinct species of hominin from South Africa
- Homo rudolfensis – Extinct hominin from the Early Pleistocene of East Africa
- LD 350-1 – Earliest known specimen of the genus Homo
- Paranthropus boisei – Extinct species of hominin of East Africa
- Paranthropus robustus – Extinct species of hominin of South Africa
