= Paula Arnold =

Austrian-Israeli botanist and writer (1885–1968)

- פאולה ארנולד
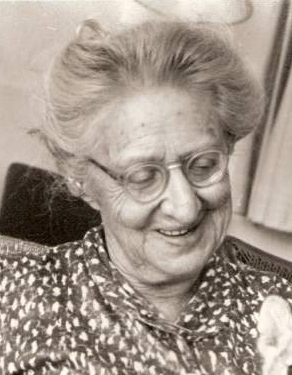
- Born: Paula Kellner; 1885; Vienna, Austria
- Died: 1968 (aged 82–83); Binyamina, Israel
- Citizenship: Israeli
- Occupations: Botanist, journalist

Paula Arnold (Hebrew: פאולה ארנולד; 1885–1968) was an Austrian-born Israeli journalist, botanist, and naturalist. She was noted for her works on the flora and birds of Israel.

== Biography ==
Paula Kellner (later Arnold) was born in 1885 in Vienna, Austria, which was then the capital of the Austro-Hungarian Empire. Her father, Leon Kellner, taught English literature at the University of Vienna and was one of the first to become a Zionist and member of Theodor Herzl's closest circle. Paula met Herzl for the first time at the age of 12. At 13, she traveled with her parents for a year to England.

Kellner pursued teaching in adulthood, but after her marriage in 1910 to Marcus (Max) Arnold, she decided to pursue journalism, writing in newspapers and various magazines. She also wrote the episode that dealt with Austria in "countries and peoples," issued by Pittman in London.

In 1926 she began teaching at a school in Vienna. A year later she began writing for the Baltimore Sun and, in 1931, the Manchester Guardian. About this time, she began to lose her hearing, so she decided to abandon her dream of teaching English in Israel. Instead, she learned pottery in the workshop of a Russian potter, Iskra.

In November 1933, she immigrated to Eretz Israel (Land of Israel) with Max Arnold. The two settled in Binyamina and set up a pottery workshop there. After Max's death in 1942, Paula Arnold began writing for the Palestine Post, for which she wrote a regular column of book reviews and "nature lists," which were later collected in her book Israel Nature Notes. In addition, she published in various newspapers in Hebrew, English and German. In 1960, for the occasion of the centenary of Herzl's birth, she translated and published, Herzl's utopian book, Altneuland. In 1962, her guide Birds of Israel was published with illustrations by Walter Ferguson. Arnold wrote an autobiography that was published entitled Memories in Love.

Arnold's younger sister, Dora, was married for several years to the philosopher Walter Benjamin.

== Published works ==
- Arnold, Paula; Ferguson, Walter (1962). Birds of Israel = צפורי הארץ. Shalit Publishers. OCLC 2095418.
- Levy, Brakha; Berlinger, Zeʼev; Silberstein, Zwi; Arnold, Paula (1958). Mt. Carmel flowers: thirty-two wildflowers growing on Mt. Carmel. Municipality of Haifa, Dept. of education. OCLC 19594101.
- Arnold, Paula (1965). Israel nature notes. Shalit Publishers. OCLC 5346231.
- Avigad, Berakhah; Berlinger, Zeʼev; Zilbershṭin, Tsevi; Arnold, Paula; Cohen-Waitz, Lea (1963). Trees and shrubs in Israel: twenty seven wild trees and shrubs. Dept. of Education. OCLC 26769151.
- Kellner, Leon; Arnold, Paula; Delisle, Arthur L (1914). Austria of the Austrians and Hungary of the Hungarians. C. Scribner's Sons. OCLC 5194678.

== See also ==
- Women of Israel
- Wildlife of Israel
