= Walter Ferguson (painter) =

American painter

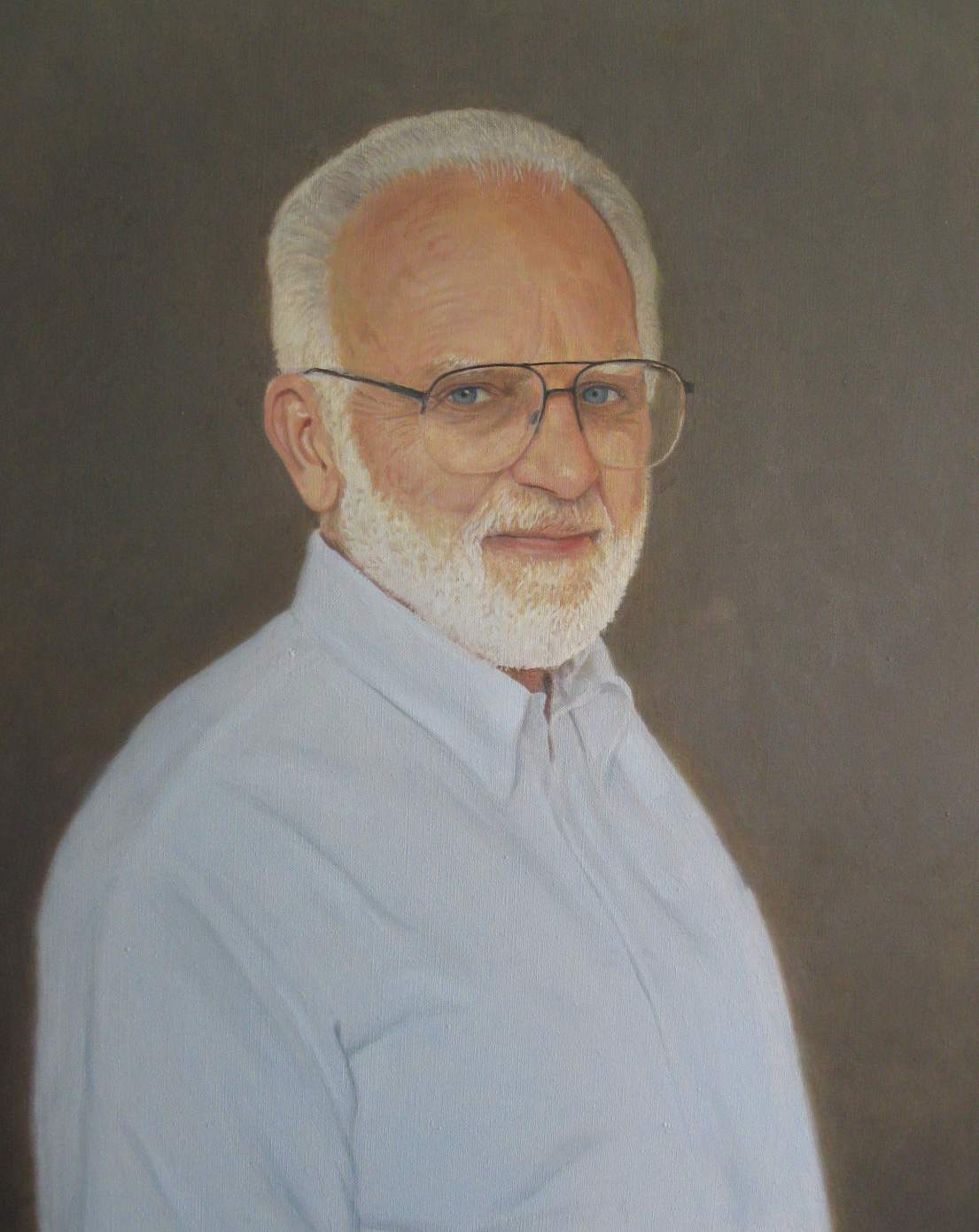
- Self-portrait of Walter Ferguson
- Born: Walter William Ferguson; 1930; New York City, U.S.
- Died: December 18, 2015
- Education: Yale School of Art; Pratt Institute
- Occupations: Painter, zoological illustrator, educator
- Employer(s): American Museum of Natural History; Bezalel School of Art; Tel Aviv University
- Known for: Wildlife and environmental art Animal reconstructions for the AMNH; Illustrations for The Mammals of Israel and Birds of Israel

Walter William Ferguson was born in New York City in 1930 and died in 2015. He received his formal art training under scholarship at Yale School of Fine Arts and Pratt Institute. He has exhibited widely in Israel and abroad and his paintings are in many private collections.

Ferguson is a 1948 graduate of Midwood High School, and is known to have painted at least two murals at the school while he was a student. Both murals still exist in their original locations as of January 2016.

Ferguson painted a wide variety of subjects including wildlife, portraits, and landscapes. In addition to his fine art, Ferguson has produced limited editions of serigraphs and litho-offsets prints. He has written and illustrated seven books and illustrated 26 books and many articles. He was commissioned by LIFE magazine to illustrate endangered species. Ferguson wrote and illustrated a book on The Mammals of Israel. He also illustrated the book written by Paula Arnold called Birds of Israel in 1962. His paintings have helped raise funds to reintroduce into Israel animals that became extinct since Biblical times.

Ferguson has worked for the American Museum of Natural History where he did paintings reconstructing extinct animals. He moved to Israel in 1965, where he briefly taught art at Bezalel School of Art. He has been staff artist for the Department of Zoology of the Tel Aviv University for 29 years. In addition to his fine art, Ferguson has contributed to zoology and Paleoanthropology.

A 2010 interview of Walter Ferguson by Ynet, Israel's largest and most popular news and content website, was published under the Ecology & Science that covered his career work including a live interview.

The works by Ferguson have helped increase the popularity of animal artwork in Israel, as reported in the Jerusalem Post article "Wildlife art exhibit to open at Jerusalem Bird Observatory" by Sharon Udasin on October 27, 2011.

Walter Ferguson was asked to contribute several environmental paintings to the first Environmental Impact show and subsequent tour that premiered at the Canton Museum of Art in Ohio on September 1, 2013.

Ferguson died on December 18, 2015.

David J. Wagner published an article in the Millennium Alliance for Humanity and the Biosphere (MAHB), which is an initiative of Stanford University, called "Environmental Ideology Through Art" in 2016 that included a description of Walter Ferguson's work among other exhibitors.

In 2017, Ynet published another article under a quote Ferguson used to describe his work's objective of capturing the spark of life in his paintings. An article,"Memory of an Environmental Impact", was published in the MAHB during the follow-on exhibit and tour called Environmental Impact II that is coping with the 2020 pandemic.
