= Ledi-Geraru =

- Paleoanthropological site
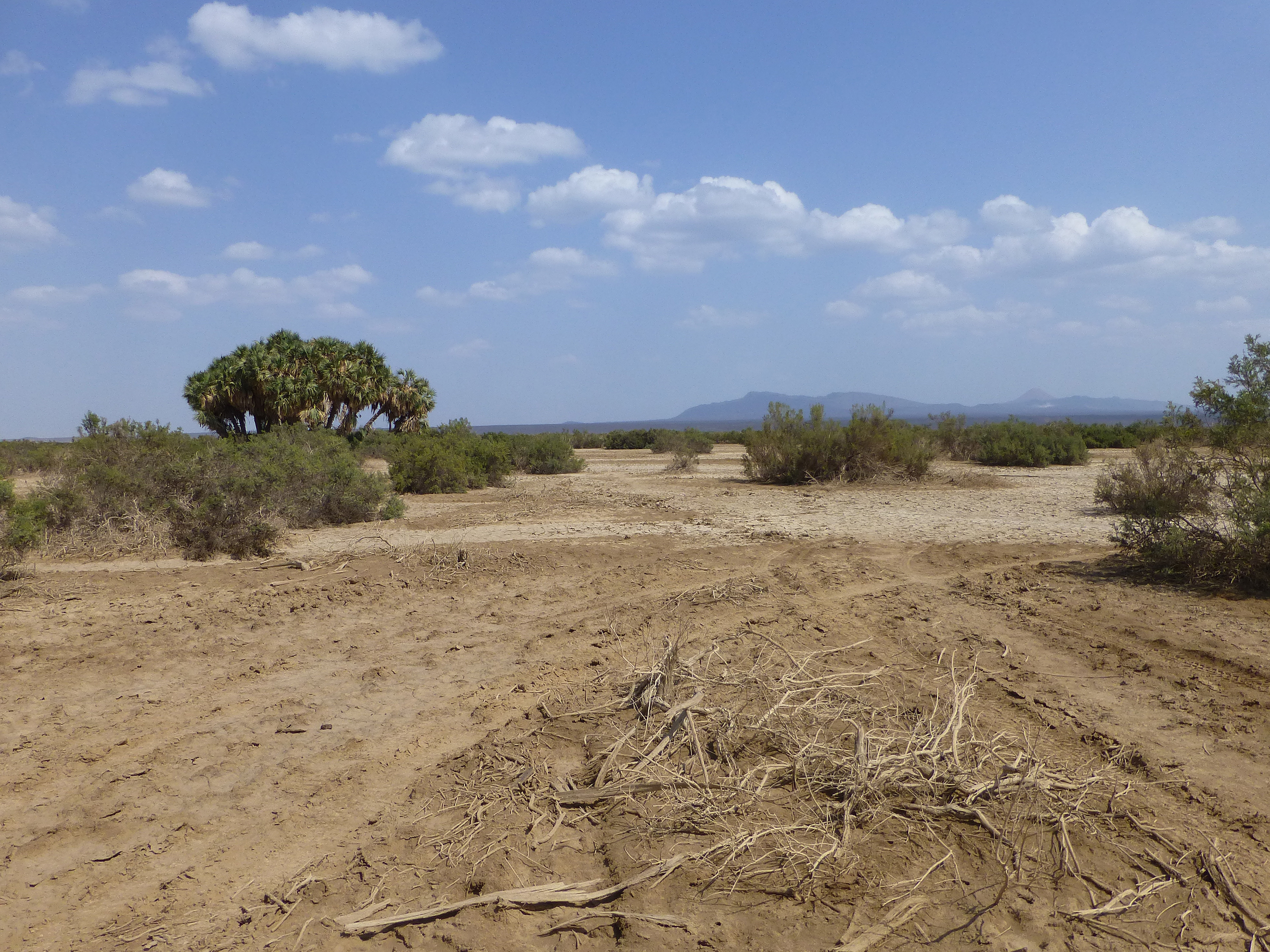
- Ledi-Geraru
- Interactive map of Ledi-Geraru
- Coordinates: 11.25°N 40.70°E
- Country: Ethiopia
- Region: Afar

Ledi-Geraru is a paleoanthropological research area in Mille district, Afar Region, northeastern Ethiopia, along the Ledi and Geraru rivers (two left tributaries of the Awash, south of the Mille river). It stretches for about 50 km, located just to the northeast of the Hadar paleoanthropological area.

Early research was conducted in 1972–1974. The Ledi-Geraru Research Project was launched in 2002.

== Paleoanthropology ==
The site is known for its early stone tools, dated about 2.6 million years old. A hominin mandible was found in 2013, known as LD 350-1 and dated 2.75 - 2.8 million years old, which is the very earliest specimen of the genus Homo. In 2018 the dentition of a new species of Australopithecus was discovered, and new descriptions published in 2025.

== Palaeoenvironment ==
Based on dental microwear texture analysis of fossils of bovids belonging to various tribes found at Ledi-Geraru, the site is believed to have been characterised by a very grassy, open environment.

== See also ==
- Afar Triangle
- List of human evolution fossils
