= KNM-ER 1813 =

Hominin fossil

KNM ER 1813
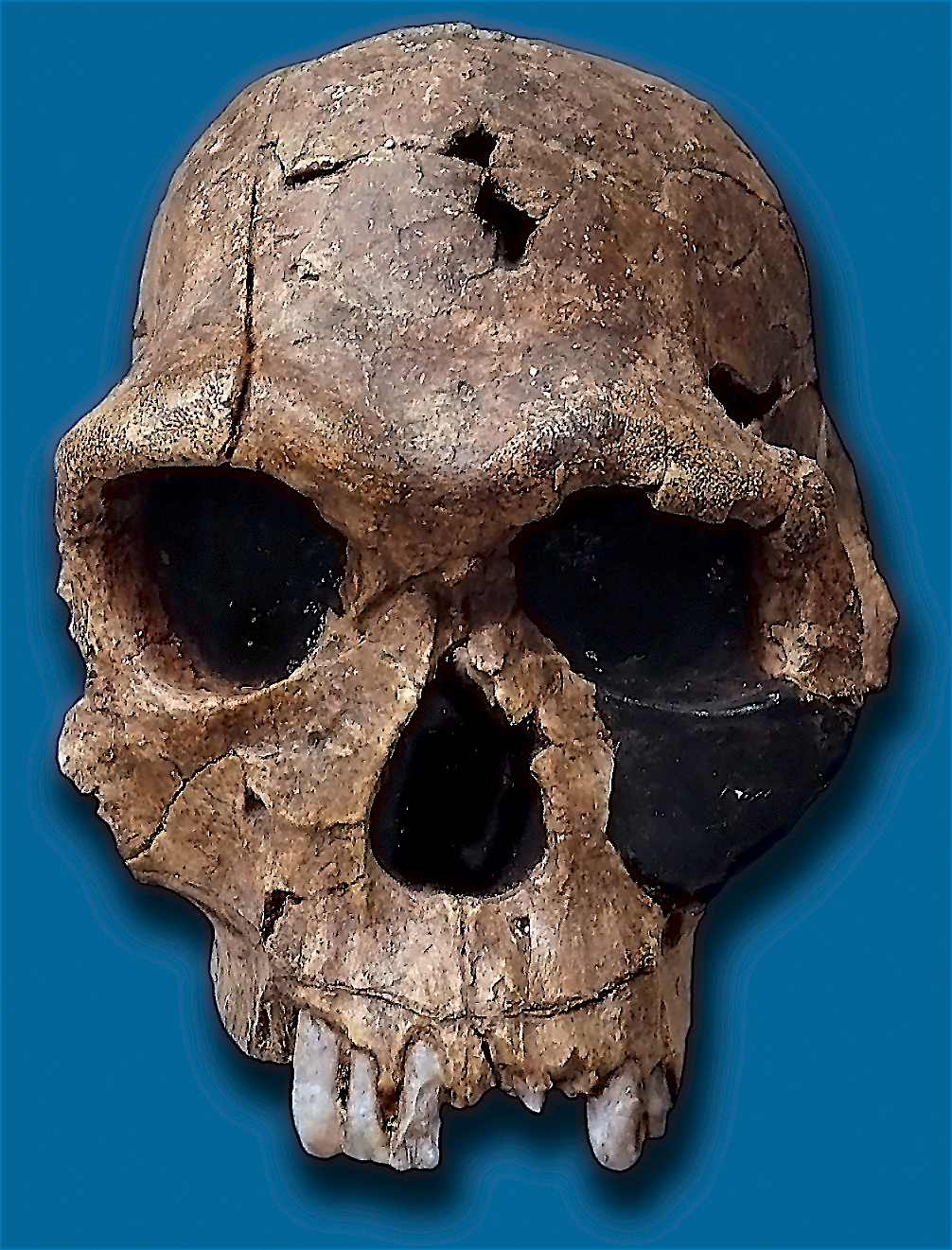
- Catalog no.: KNM ER 1813
- Species: Homo habilis
- Age: 1.9 Ma
- Place discovered: Koobi Fora, Kenya
- Date discovered: 1973
- Discovered by: Kamoya Kimeu

KNM ER 1813 is a skull of the species Homo habilis. It was discovered in Koobi Fora, Kenya by Kamoya Kimeu in 1973, and is estimated to be 1.9 million years old.

Its characteristics include an overall smaller size than other Homo habilis finds, but with a fully adult and typical H. habilis morphology.

It is an adult (the third molars were completely erupted and showed signs of wear) with an estimated cranial capacity of only 510 cc.

The designation indicates specimen 1813, collected from the east shore of Lake Rudolf (now Lake Turkana) for the Kenya National Museums.

== See also ==
- List of fossil sites (with link directory)
- List of human evolution fossils (with images)
