= OH 7 =

Hominin fossil

Johnny's Child
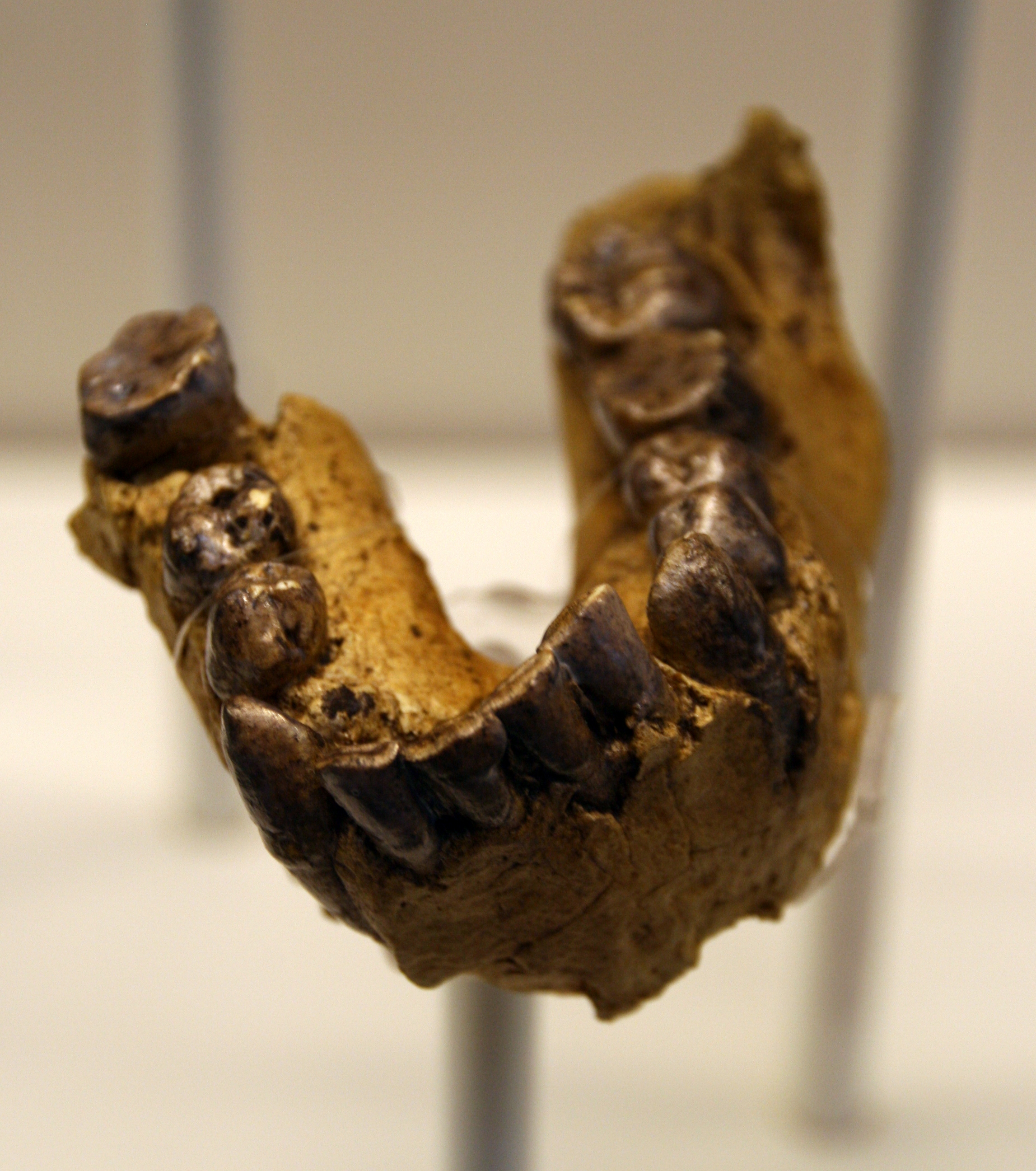
- Catalog no.: OH 7
- Common name: Johnny's Child
- Species: Homo habilis
- Age: 1.75 million years
- Place discovered: Olduvai Gorge, Tanzania
- Date discovered: 4 November 1960
- Discovered by: Jonathan Leakey

OH 7 (Olduvai Hominid No. 7), also nicknamed "Johnny's Child", is the type specimen of Homo habilis. The fossils were discovered on 4 November 1960 in Olduvai Gorge, Tanzania, by Jonathan and Mary Leakey. The remains are dated to approximately 1.75 million years, and consist of fragmented parts of a lower mandible (which still holds thirteen teeth, as well as unerupted wisdom teeth), an isolated maxillary molar, two parietal bones, and twenty-one finger, hand, and wrist bones.

The OH 7 hand is wide, with a large thumb and broad fingertips, similar to that of humans; however, unlike in humans the fingers are relatively long and exhibit chimpanzee-like curvature. Furthermore, the thumb's orientation relative to the other fingers resembles the anatomy of great apes. The parietal bones — a nearly complete left parietal and fragmented right parietal — were used to deduce the cranial capacity of the hominid, which was placed at 663 cc because the fossils belonged to a 12- or 13-year-old male. This was extrapolated by Phillip Tobias to 674 cc for the hominid's full adult potential. However, other scientists have estimated the cranial capacity at 590 cc to 710 cc.

Louis Leakey, John Napier, and Phillip Tobias were among the first to extensively study the fossils. The Leakey team and others argued that, due expanded cranial capacity, gnathic reduction, relatively small post-canine teeth (compared to Paranthropus boisei), Homo-like pattern of craniofacial development, and a precision grip in the hand fragments (which indicated the ability for tool use), set OH 7 apart as a transitional species between Australopithecus africanus and Homo erectus.

The Leakey team announced the new species Homo habilis in the April 1964 issue of Nature, igniting debate among the anthropology community which lasted through the 1970s. As early as May 1964, Kenneth Oakley and Bernard Campbell had raised concerns about the Leakey team's findings with their own publication in Nature, and in July of that same year Sir Wilfrid Le Gros Clark bluntly stated his hope that H. habilis "will disappear as rapidly as he came." The controversy and bias against the newly named species led some anthropologists to refer to H. habilis as Australopithecus habilis or assign associated fossil remains to other Homo species, a trend that continued long after Le Gros Clark's death in 1971.

Other critics noted that OH 7 was found in a region known to contain P. boisei fossils, was of an immature individual, and that the differences between H. habilis and P. boisei were not enough to warrant a new species. Some believe OH 7 more closely resembles A. africanus.

== See also ==
- List of fossil sites (with link directory)
- List of hominina (hominid) fossils (with images)
- Homo habilis
- Fossils
