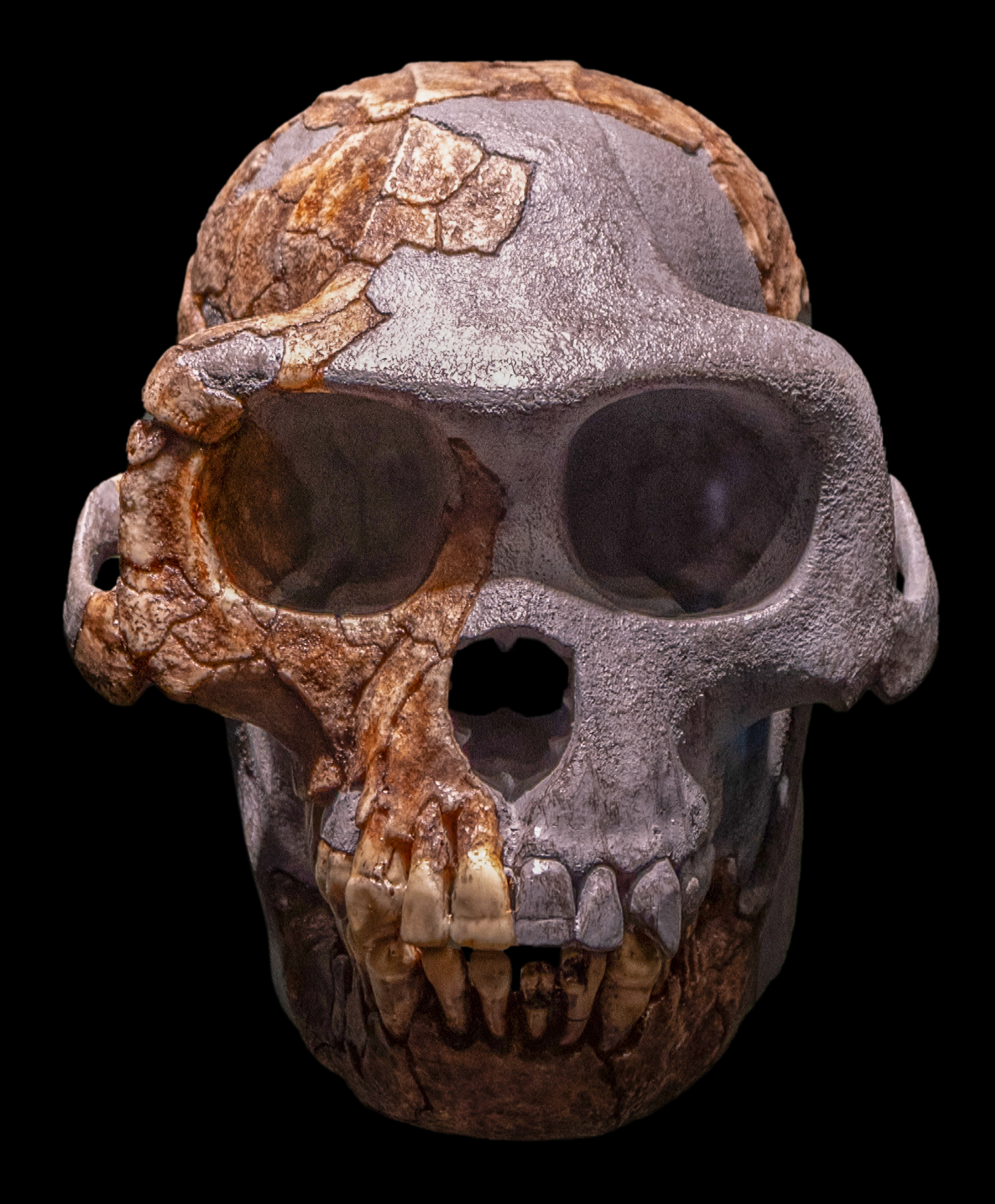
- A. ramidus at the Royal Tyrrell Museum of Palaeontology

Scientific classification
- Kingdom: Animalia
- Phylum: Chordata
- Class: Mammalia
- Order: Primates
- Superfamily: Hominoidea
- Family: Hominidae
- Genus: †Ardipithecus
- Species: †A. ramidus

Binomial name
- †Ardipithecus ramidus (White, Suwa & Asfaw, 1994)

Synonyms
- Australopithecus ramidus

= Ardipithecus ramidus =

Ardipithecus ramidus Temporal range: Zanclean 4.5–4.32 Ma

Extinct hominin from Early Pliocene Ethiopia

Ardipithecus ramidus is a species of australopithecine from the Afar region of Early Pliocene Ethiopia 4.4 million years ago (Ma). The species A. ramidus is the type species for the genus Ardipithecus. There is an older species in this same genus, Ardipithecus kadabba that was discovered more recently.

A. ramidus, unlike modern hominids, has adaptations for both walking on two legs (bipedality) and life in the trees (arboreality), as it has a divergent big toe and evidence of bipedality. This combination of a big toe that would facilitate climbing suggests that Ardipithecus was not as efficient at bipedality as humans or even Australopithecus (a genus that did not have a divergent big toe), nor as good at arboreality as non-human great apes.

The discovery of Ardipithecus, along with Miocene apes, has reworked academic understanding of the chimpanzee–human last common ancestor. Historically, humans were thought to have evolved from a chimpanzee-like ancestor. However, Ardipithecus demonstrates that the last common ancestor had no "close analog among living monkeys or apes" (like modern-day chimpanzees, orangutans or gorillas), but rather represents an intermediate species between Australopithecus immediately (acting as a bridge in many respects to the yet to be found late Miocene African ape) and both humans and modern-day chimpanzees distantly.

In addition to the divergent big toe, another unusual feature of Ardipithecus is the dental anatomy, as it has reduced size and sexual dimorphism of the canines. This reduction in the size of the canines for both males and females suggests that A. ramidus males were less aggressive than those of modern chimps, a feature that is correlated with increased parental care and monogamy in primates.

A. ramidus appears to have inhabited woodland and bushland corridors between savannas, and was a generalized omnivore.

== Taxonomy ==
Map showing discovery locations of various australopithecines

The first remains were described in 1994 by American anthropologist Tim D. White, Japanese paleoanthropologist Gen Suwa, and Ethiopian paleontologist Berhane Asfaw, as part of a larger research project done in collaboration with geologist Giday WoldeGabriel referred to as the Middle Awash Project.

The holotype specimen, ARA-VP-6/1, comprised an associated set of 10 teeth; and there were 16 other paratypes identified, preserving also skull and arm fragments. These were unearthed in the 4.4-million-year-old (Ma) deposits of the Afar region in Aramis, Ethiopia from 1992 to 1993, making them the oldest hominin remains at the time, surpassing Australopithecus afarensis. They initially classified it as Australopithecus ramidus, the species name deriving from the Afar language ramid "root". In 1995, they made a corrigendum recommending it be split off into a separate genus, Ardipithecus; the name stems from Afar ardi "ground" or "floor". The 4.4-million-year-old female ARA-VP 6/500 ("Ardi") is the most complete specimen.

Fossils from at least nine A. ramidus individuals at As Duma, in the Gona Western Margin, Afar, were unearthed from 1993 to 2003. The fossils were dated to between 4.32 and 4.51 million years ago.

In 2001, 6.5- to 5.5-million-year-old fossils from the Middle Awash were classified as a subspecies of A. ramidus by Ethiopian paleoanthropologist Yohannes Haile-Selassie. In 2004, Haile-Selassie, Suwa and White split it off into its own species, A. kadabba. A. kadabba is considered to have been the direct ancestor of A. ramidus, making Ardipithecus a chronospecies.

The exact taxonomic affinities of Ardipithecus have been debated. White, in 1994, considered A. ramidus to have been more closely related to humans than chimpanzees, though noting it to be the most ape-like fossil hominin to date. In 2001, French paleontologist Brigitte Senut and colleagues aligned it more closely to chimpanzees, but this has been refuted. In 2009, White and colleagues reaffirmed the position of Ardipithecus as more closely related to modern humans based on dental similarity, a short base of the skull, and adaptations to bipedality. In 2011, primatologist Esteban Sarmiento said that there is not enough evidence to assign Ardipithecus to Hominini (comprising both humans and chimps), but its closer affinities to humans have been reaffirmed in following years. White and colleagues consider it to have been closely related to or the ancestor of the temporally close Australopithecus anamensis, which was the ancestor to Au. afarensis.

African Hominin timeline

Before the discovery of Ardipithecus and other pre-Australopithecus hominins, it was assumed that the chimpanzee–human last common ancestor and preceding apes appeared much like modern-day chimpanzees, orangutans and gorillas, which would have meant these three changed very little over millions of years. Their discovery led to the postulation that modern great apes, much like humans, evolved several specialized adaptations to their environment (have highly derived morphologies), and their ancestors were comparatively poorly adapted to suspensory behavior or knuckle walking, and did not have such a specialized diet. Also, the origins of bipedality were thought to have occurred due to a switch from a forest to a savanna environment, but the presence of bipedal pre-Australopithecus hominins in woodlands has called this into question, though they inhabited wooded corridors near or between savannas. It is also possible that Ardipithecus and pre-Australopithecus were random offshoots of the hominin line.

== Description ==
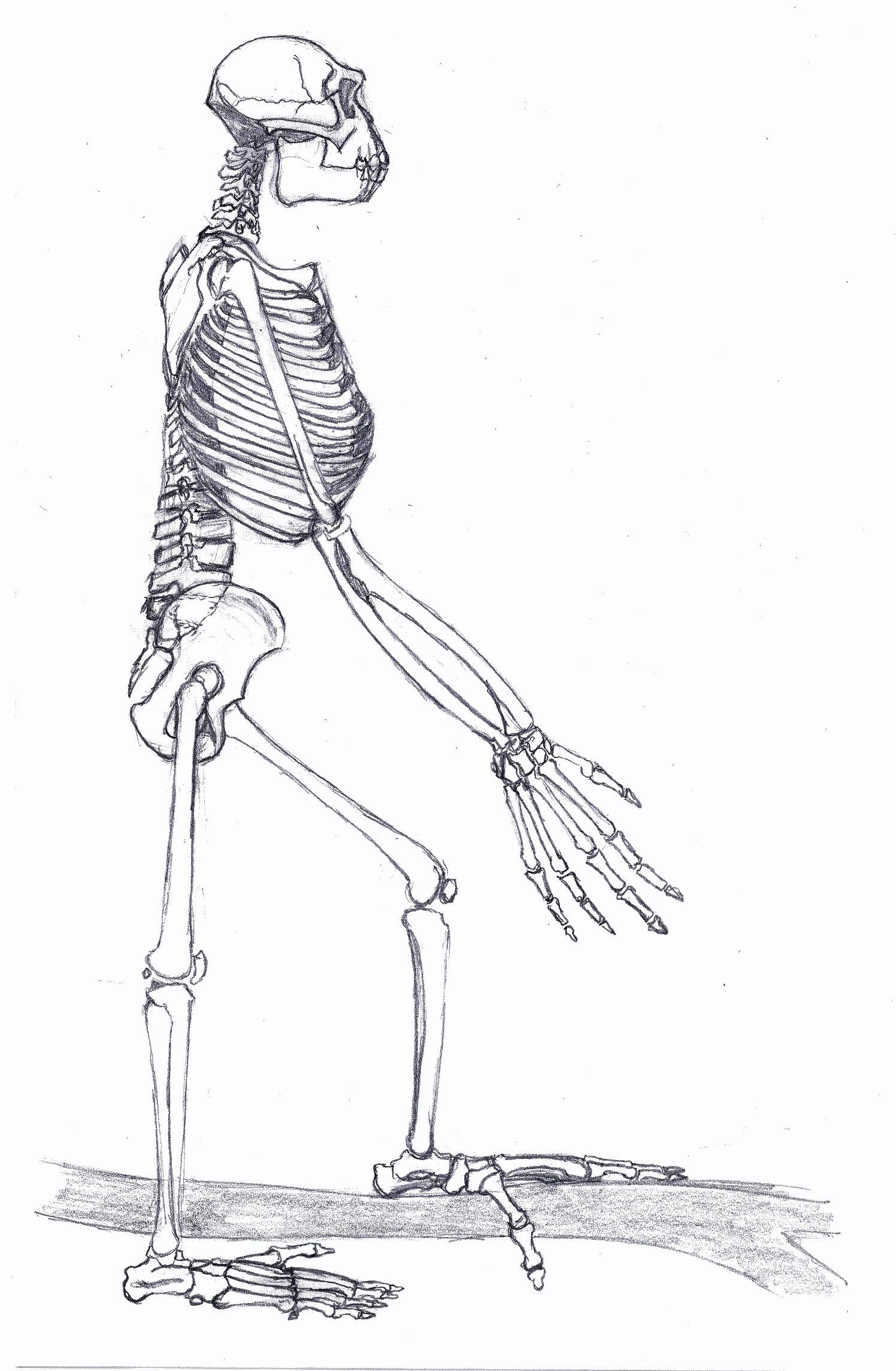
Reconstruction of Ardipithecus skeleton

Assuming subsistence was primarily sourced from climbing in trees, A. ramidus may not have exceeded 35–60 kg (77–132 lb). "Ardi," a larger female specimen, was estimated to have stood 117–124 cm (3 ft 10 in – 4 ft 1 in) and weighed 51 kg (112 lb) based on comparisons with large-bodied female apes. Unlike the later Australopithecus but much like chimps and humans, males and females were about the same size.

A. ramidus had a small brain, measuring 300–350 cc (18–21 cu in). This is slightly smaller than a modern bonobo or chimp brain, but much smaller than the brain of Australopithecus—about 400–550 cc (24–34 cu in)—and roughly 20% the size of the modern human brain. Like chimps, the A. ramidus face was much more pronounced (prognathic) than modern humans. The size of the upper canine tooth in A. ramidus males was not distinctly different from that of females (only 12% larger), in contrast to the sexual dimorphism observed in chimps where males have significantly larger and sharper upper canines than females.

A. ramidus feet are better suited for walking than chimps. However, like non-human great apes, but unlike all previously recognized human ancestors, it had a grasping big toe adapted for locomotion in the trees (an arboreal lifestyle), though it was likely not as specialized for grasping as it is in modern great apes. Its tibial and tarsal lengths indicate a leaping ability similar to bonobos. It lacks any characters suggestive of specialized suspension, vertical climbing, or knuckle walking; and it seems to have used a method of locomotion unlike any modern great ape, which combined arboreal palm walking clambering and a form of bipedality more primitive than Australopithecus. The discovery of such unspecialized locomotion led American anthropologist Owen Lovejoy and colleagues to postulate that the chimpanzee–human last common ancestor used a similar method of locomotion.

The upper pelvis (distance from the sacrum to the hip joint) is shorter than in any known ape. It is inferred to have had a long lumbar vertebral series, and lordosis (human curvature of the spine), which are adaptations for bipedality. However, the legs were not completely aligned with the torso (were anterolaterally displaced), and Ardipithecus may have relied more on its quadriceps than hamstrings which is more effective for climbing than walking. However, it lacked foot arches and had to adopt a flat-footed stance. These would have made it less efficient at walking and running than Australopithecus and Homo. It may not have employed a bipedal gait for very long time intervals. It may have predominantly used palm walking on the ground, Nonetheless, A. ramidus still had specialized adaptations for bipedality, such as a robust fibularis longus muscle used in pushing the foot off the ground while walking (plantarflexion), the big toe (though still capable of grasping) was used for pushing off, and the legs were aligned directly over the ankles instead of bowing out like in non-human great apes.

== Paleobiology ==
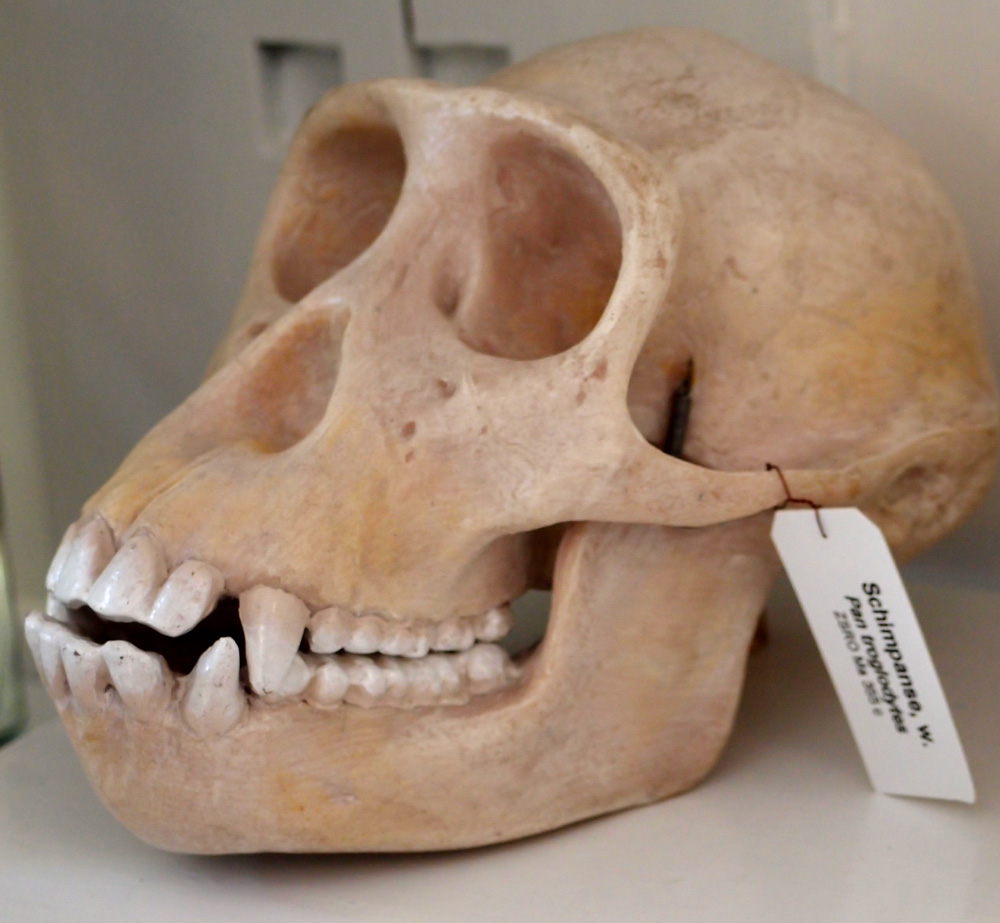
Chimp skull (note the large canines and elongated face)

The reduced canine size and reduced skull robustness in A. ramidus males (about the same size in males and females) is typically correlated with reduced male–male conflict, increased parental investment, and monogamy. Because of this, it is assumed that A. ramidus lived in a society similar to bonobos and ateline monkeys due to a process of self domestication (becoming more and more docile which allows for a more gracile build). Because a similar process is thought to have occurred with the comparatively docile bonobos from more aggressive chimps, A. ramidus society may have seen an increase in maternal care and female mate selection compared to its ancestors. Alternatively, it is possible that increased male size is a derived trait instead of basal (it evolved later rather than earlier), and is a specialized adaptation in modern great apes as a response to a different and more physically exerting lifestyle in males than females rather than being tied to interspecific conflict.

Australian anthropologists Gary Clark and Maciej Henneberg argued that such shortening of the skull—which may have caused a descension of the larynx—as well as lordosis—allowing better movement of the larynx—increased vocal ability, significantly pushing back the origin of language to well before the evolution of Homo. They argued that self domestication was aided by the development of vocalization, living in a pro-social society, as a means of non-violently dealing with conflict. They conceded that chimps and A. ramidus likely had the same vocal capabilities, but said that A. ramidus made use of more complex vocalizations, and vocalized at the same level as a human infant due to selective pressure to become more social. This would have allowed their society to become more complex. They also noted that the base of the skull stopped growing with the brain by the end of juvenility, whereas in chimps it continues growing with the rest of the body into adulthood; and considered this evidence of a switch from a gross skeletal anatomy trajectory to a neurological development trajectory due to selective pressure for sociability. Nonetheless, their conclusions are highly speculative.

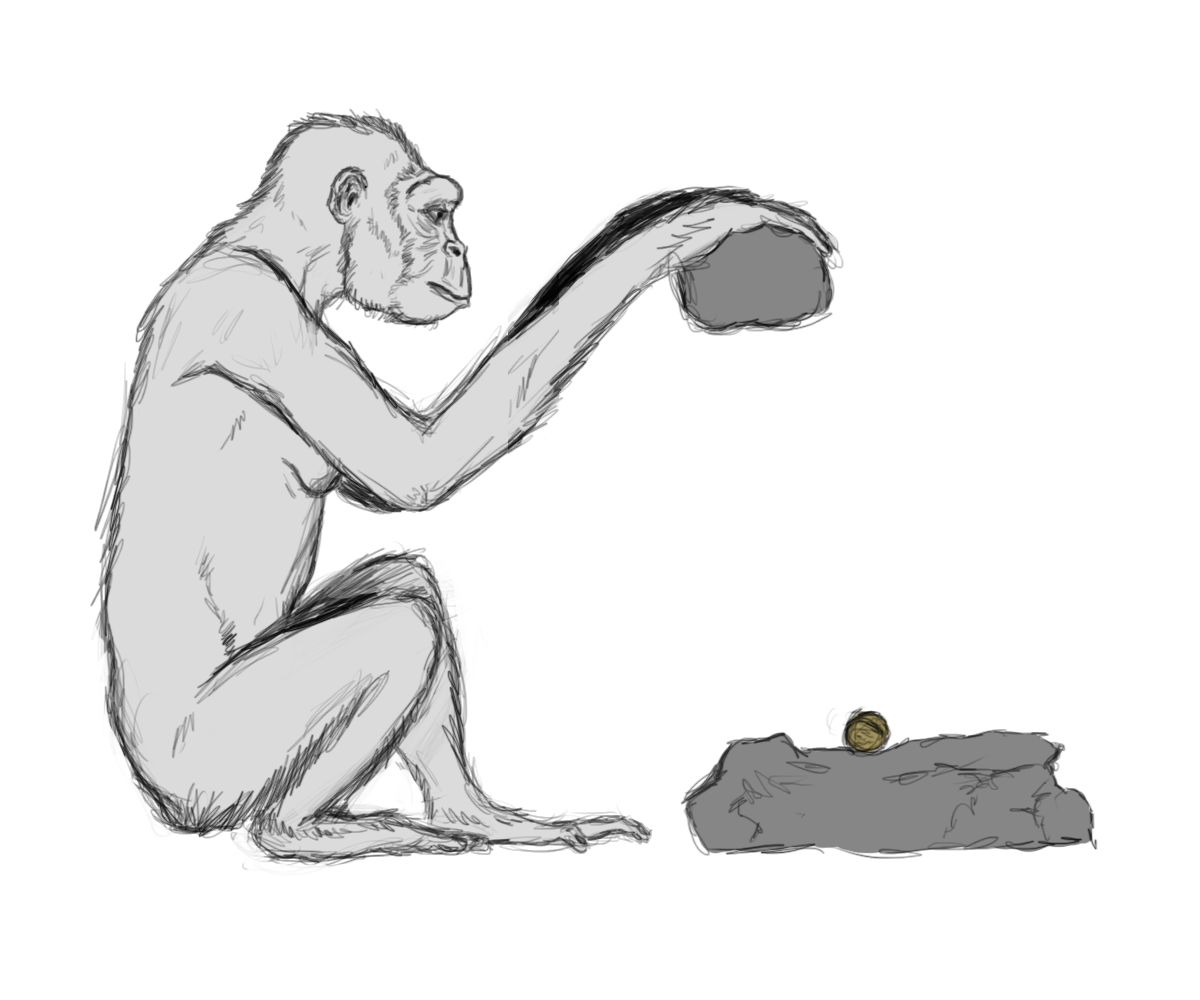
Hypothetical restoration of a female Ardipithecus using a hammer and anvil to crack open a nut

American primatologist Craig Stanford postulated that A. ramidus behaved similarly to chimps, which frequent both the trees and the ground, have a polygynous society, hunt cooperatively, and are the most technologically advanced non-human. However, Clark and Henneberg concluded that Ardipithecus cannot be compared to chimps, having been too similar to humans. According to French paleoprimatologist Jean-Renaud Boisserie, the hands of Ardipithecus would have been dextrous enough to handle basic tools, though it has not been associated with any tools.

The teeth of A. ramidus indicate that it was likely a generalized omnivore and fruit eater which predominantly consumed C_{3} plants in woodlands or gallery forests. The teeth lacked adaptations for abrasive foods. Dental microwear textures in A. ramidus support the interpretation of it being a frugivore. Lacking the speed and agility of chimps and baboons, meat intake by Ardipithecus, if done, would have been sourced from only what could have been captured by limited pursuit, or from scavenging carcasses.

The second-to-fourth digit ratios of A. ramidus are low, consistent with high androgenisation and a disposition towards polygyny.

== Paleoecology ==
Half of the large mammal species associated with A. ramidus at Aramis are spiral-horned antelope and colobine monkeys (namely Kuseracolobus and Pliopapio). There are a few specimens of primitive white and black rhino species, and elephants, giraffes and hippo specimens are less abundant. These animals indicate that Aramis ranged from wooded grasslands to forests, but A. ramidus likely preferred the closed habitats, specifically riverine areas as such water sources may have supported more canopy coverage. Aramis as a whole generally had less than 25% canopy cover. There were exceedingly high rates of scavenging, indicating a highly competitive environment somewhat like Ngorongoro Crater. Predators of the area were the hyenas Ikelohyaena abronia and Crocuta dietrichi, the bear Agriotherium, the cats Dinofelis and Megantereon, the dog Eucyon, and crocodiles. Bayberry, hackberry and palm trees appear to have been common at the time from Aramis to the Gulf of Aden; and botanical evidence suggests a cool, humid climate. Conversely, annual water deficit (the difference between water loss by evapotranspiration and water gain by precipitation) at Aramis was calculated to have been about 1,500 mm (59 in), which is seen in some of the hottest, driest parts of East Africa.

Carbon isotope analyses of the herbivore teeth from the Gona Western Margin associated with A. ramidus indicate that these herbivores fed mainly on C4 plants and grasses rather than forest plants. The area seems to have featured bushland and grasslands.

== See also ==
- Australopithecus – Genus of hominin ancestral to modern humans
- Ardi – Fossilized remains of a human-like hominim
- Graecopithecus – Extinct genus of hominids
- Orrorin – Postulated early hominin discovered in Kenya
- Paranthropus – Contested extinct genus of hominins
- Sahelanthropus – Extinct hominid from Miocene Africa
