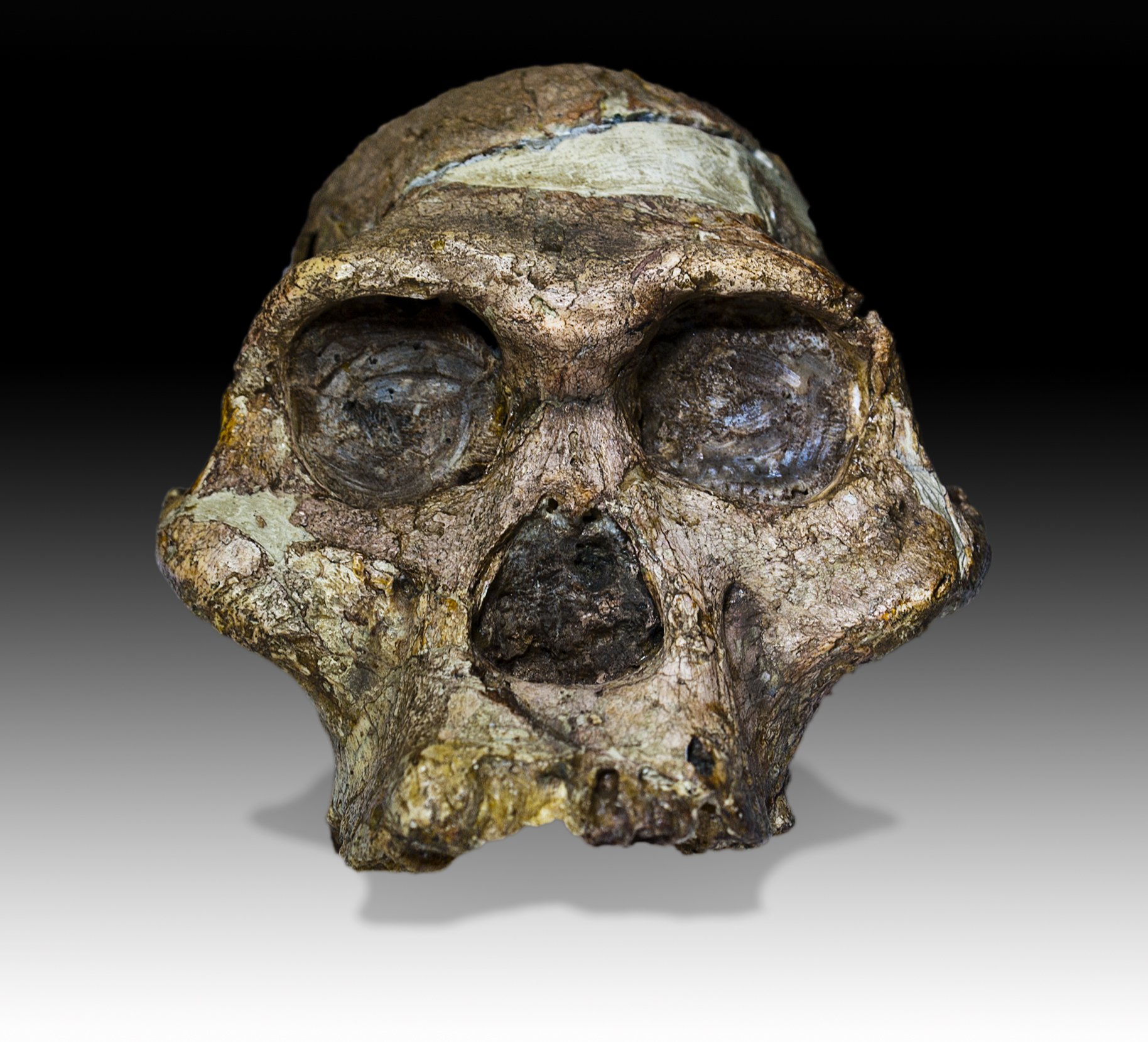
- Mrs. Ples, an Australopithecus africanus specimen

Scientific classification
- Kingdom: Animalia
- Phylum: Chordata
- Class: Mammalia
- Order: Primates
- Superfamily: Hominoidea
- Family: Hominidae
- Subfamily: Homininae
- Tribe: Hominini
- Subtribe: Australopithecina
- Genus: †Australopithecus; R.A. Dart, 1925

Type species
- †Australopithecus africanus Dart, 1925

Species
- †A. afarensis; †A. anamensis; †A. africanus; †A. bahrelghazali (= A. afarensis?); †A. deyiremeda; †A. garhi; †"A. prometheus" (nomen oblitum; =A. africanus?); †A. sediba

Classically excluded (but cladistically included)
- †Paranthropus; †Kenyanthropus; Homo

= Australopithecus =

Australopithecus Temporal range: Zanclean – Gelasian, 4.3–1.9/1.2 mya

Genus of hominin ancestral to modern humans

Australopithecus (/ˌɒstrələˈpɪθɪkəs, -loʊ-/, OS-trə-lə-PITH-i-kəs, -loh-; or /ɒsˌtrələpɪˈθiːkəs/, os-TRA-lə-pi-THEE-kəs, from Latin australis 'southern' and Ancient Greek πίθηκος (píthēkos) 'ape') is an extinct genus of early hominins that existed in Africa during the Pliocene and Early Pleistocene. The genera Homo (which includes modern humans), Paranthropus, and Kenyanthropus evolved from some Australopithecus species. Australopithecus is a member of the subtribe Australopithecina, which sometimes also includes Ardipithecus, though the term "australopithecine" is sometimes used to refer only to members of Australopithecus. Species include A. garhi, A. africanus, A. sediba, A. afarensis, A. anamensis, A. bahrelghazali, and A. deyiremeda. Debate exists as to whether some Australopithecus species should be reclassified into new genera, or if Paranthropus and Kenyanthropus are synonymous with Australopithecus, in part because of the taxonomic inconsistency.

Furthermore, because e.g. A. africanus is more closely related to humans, or their ancestors at the time, than e.g. A. anamensis and many more Australopithecus branches, Australopithecus cannot be consolidated into a coherent grouping without also including the genus Homo and other genera.

The earliest known member of the genus, A. anamensis, existed in eastern Africa around 4.2 million years ago. Australopithecus fossils become more widely dispersed throughout eastern and southern Africa (the Chadian A. bahrelghazali indicates that the genus was much more widespread than the fossil record suggests), before eventually becoming extinct 1.9 million years ago (or 1.2 to 0.6 million years ago if Paranthropus is included). While no members of the genus Australopithecus survive today, there are living descendants, such as the genus Homo, which evolved from Australopithecus at some time between 3 and 2 million years ago.

Australopithecus possessed two of the three duplicated genes derived from SRGAP2 roughly 3.4 and 2.4 million years ago (SRGAP2B and SRGAP2C), the second of which contributed to the increase in number and migration of neurons in the human brain. Significant changes to the hand first appear in the fossil record of later A. afarensis about 3 million years ago (fingers shortened relative to thumb and changes to the joints between the index finger and the trapezium and capitate).

== Taxonomy ==
=== Research history ===
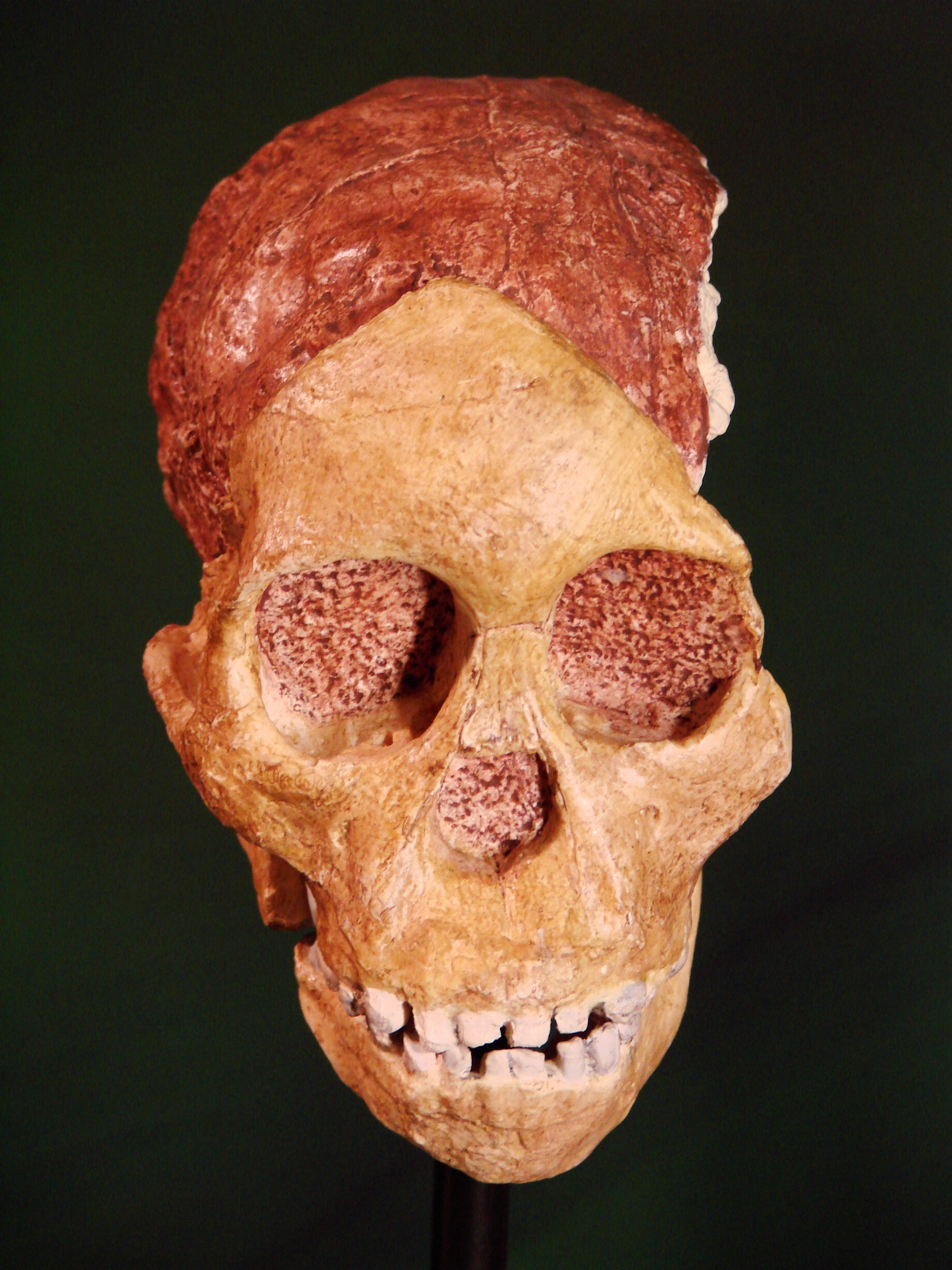
Taung Child's skull

The first Australopithecus specimen, the type specimen, was discovered in 1924 in a lime quarry by workers at Taung, South Africa. The specimen was studied by the Australian anatomist Raymond Dart, who was then working at the University of the Witwatersrand in Johannesburg. The fossil skull was from a three-year-old bipedal primate (nicknamed Taung Child) that he named Australopithecus africanus. The first report was published in Nature in February 1925. Dart realised that the fossil contained a number of humanoid features, and so he came to the conclusion that this was an early human ancestor. Later, Scottish paleontologist Robert Broom and Dart set out to search for more early hominin specimens, and several more A. africanus remains from various sites. Initially, anthropologists were largely hostile to the idea that these discoveries were anything but apes, though this changed during the late 1940s.

In 1950, evolutionary biologist Ernst Walter Mayr said that all bipedal apes should be classified into the genus Homo, and considered renaming Australopithecus to Homo transvaalensis. However, the contrary view taken by J.T. Robinson in 1954, excluding australopiths from Homo, became the prevalent view. The first australopithecine fossil discovered in eastern Africa was an A. boisei skull excavated by Mary Leakey in 1959 in Olduvai Gorge, Tanzania. Since then, the Leakey family has continued to excavate the gorge, uncovering further evidence for australopithecines, as well as for Homo habilis and Homo erectus. The scientific community took 20 more years to widely accept Australopithecus as a member of the human family tree.

In 1997, an almost complete Australopithecus skeleton with skull was found in the Sterkfontein caves of Gauteng, South Africa. It is now called "Little Foot" and it is around 3.7 million years old. It was named Australopithecus prometheus which has since been placed within A. africanus. Other fossil remains found in the same cave in 2008 were named Australopithecus sediba, which lived 1.9 million years ago. A. africanus probably evolved into A. sediba, which some scientists think may have evolved into Homo erectus, though this is heavily disputed.

In 2003, Spanish writer Camilo José Cela Conde and evolutionary biologist Francisco J. Ayala proposed resurrecting the genus Praeanthropus to house Orrorin, A. afarensis, A. anamensis, A. bahrelghazali, and A. garhi, but this genus has been largely dismissed.

=== Classification ===
With the apparent emergence of the genera Homo, Kenyanthropus, and Paranthropus in the genus Australopithecus, taxonomy runs into some difficulty, as the name of species incorporates their genus. According to cladistics, groups should not be left paraphyletic, where it is kept not consisting of a common ancestor and all of its descendants. Resolving this problem would cause major ramifications in the nomenclature of all descendent species. Possibilities suggested have been to rename Homo sapiens to Australopithecus sapiens (or even Pan sapiens), or to move some Australopithecus species into new genera. A study reported in 2025 reported preliminary success in extracting ancient proteins from an Australopithic tooth, suggesting that paleoproteomics has the potential to provide information about the genetic affinities of the species.

In 2002 and again in 2007, Camilo José Cela Conde et al. suggested that A. africanus be moved to Paranthropus. On the basis of craniodental evidence, Strait and Grine (2004) suggest that A. anamensis and A. garhi should be assigned to new genera. It is debated whether or not A. bahrelghazali should be considered simply a western variant of A. afarensis instead of a separate species.

African Hominin timeline

== Evolution ==
Map of the fossil sites of the early australopithecines in Africa

A. anamensis may have descended from or was closely related to Ardipithecus ramidus. A. anamensis shows some similarities to both Ar. ramidus and Sahelanthropus.

Australopiths shared several traits with modern apes and humans, and were widespread throughout Eastern and Northern Africa by 3.5 million years ago (mya). The earliest evidence of fundamentally bipedal hominins is a (3.6 mya) fossil trackway in Laetoli, Tanzania, which bears a remarkable similarity to those of modern humans. The footprints have generally been classified as australopith, as they are the only form of prehuman hominins known to have existed in that region at that time.

According to the Chimpanzee Genome Project, the human–chimpanzee last common ancestor existed about five to six million years ago, assuming a constant rate of mutation. However, hominin species dated to earlier than the date could call this into question. Sahelanthropus tchadensis, commonly called "Toumai", is about seven million years old and Orrorin tugenensis lived at least six million years ago. Since little is known of them, they remain controversial among scientists since the molecular clock in humans has determined that humans and chimpanzees had a genetic split at least a million years later. One theory suggests that the human and chimpanzee lineages diverged somewhat at first, then some populations interbred around one million years after diverging.

== Anatomy ==
The brains of most species of Australopithecus were roughly 35% of the size of a modern human brain with an endocranial volume average of 466 cc (28.4 cu in). Although this is more than the average endocranial volume of chimpanzee brains at 360 cc (22 cu in) the earliest australopiths (A. anamensis) appear to have been within the chimpanzee range, whereas some later australopith specimens have a larger endocranial volume than that of some early Homo fossils.

Most species of Australopithecus were diminutive and gracile, usually standing 1.2 to 1.4 m (3 ft 11 in to 4 ft 7 in) tall. It is possible that they exhibited a considerable degree of sexual dimorphism, males being larger than females. In modern populations, males are on average a mere 15% larger than females, while in Australopithecus, males could be up to 50% larger than females by some estimates. However, the degree of sexual dimorphism is debated due to the fragmentary nature of australopith remains. One paper finds that A. afarensis had a level of dimorphism close to modern humans.

According to A. Zihlman, Australopithecus body proportions closely resemble those of bonobos (Pan paniscus), leading evolutionary biologist Jeremy Griffith to suggest that bonobos may be phenotypically similar to Australopithecus. Furthermore, thermoregulatory models suggest that australopiths were fully hair covered, more like chimpanzees and bonobos, and unlike humans.

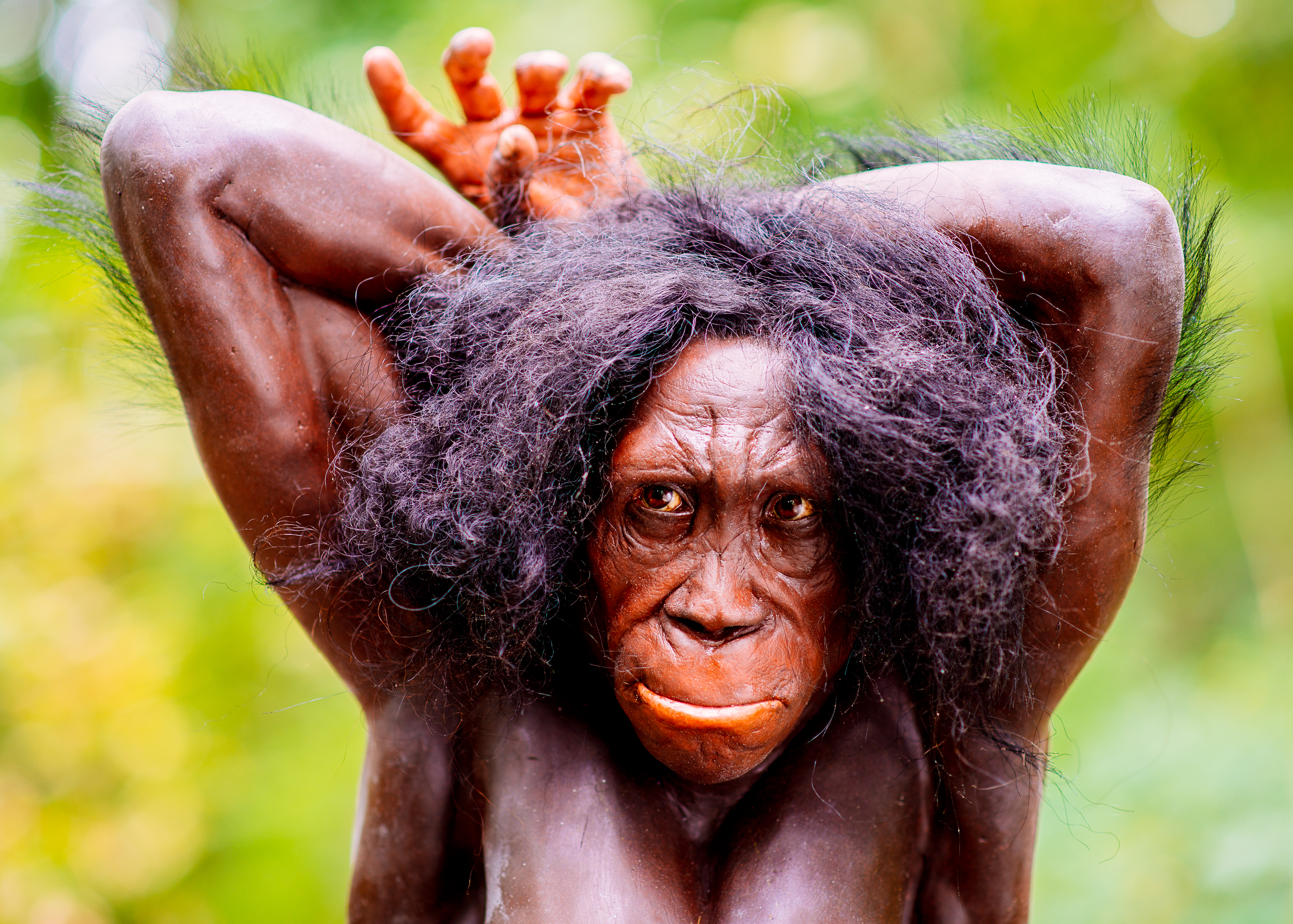
Reconstruction of a largely hairless male A. sediba by Adrie and Alfons Kennis at the Neanderthal Museum, Germany

The fossil record seems to indicate that Australopithecus is ancestral to Homo and modern humans. It was once assumed that large brain size had been a precursor to bipedalism, but the discovery of Australopithecus with a small brain but developed bipedality upset this theory. Nonetheless, it remains a matter of controversy as to how bipedalism first emerged. The advantages of bipedalism were that it left the hands free to grasp objects (e.g., carry food and young), and allowed the eyes to look over tall grasses for possible food sources or predators, but it is also argued that these advantages were not significant enough to cause the emergence of bipedalism. Earlier fossils, such as Orrorin tugenensis, indicate bipedalism around six million years ago, around the time of the split between humans and chimpanzees indicated by genetic studies. This suggests that erect, straight-legged walking originated as an adaptation to tree-dwelling. Major changes to the pelvis and feet had already taken place before Australopithecus. It was once thought that humans descended from a knuckle-walking ancestor, but this is not well-supported.

Australopithecines have thirty-two teeth, like modern humans. Their molars were parallel, like those of great apes, and they had a slight pre-canine gap (diastema). Their canines were smaller, like modern humans, and with the teeth less interlocked than in previous hominins. In fact, in some australopithecines, the canines are shaped more like incisors. The molars of Australopithecus fit together in much the same way those of humans do, with low crowns and four low, rounded cusps used for crushing. They have cutting edges on the crests. However, australopiths generally evolved a larger postcanine dentition with thicker enamel. Australopiths in general had thick enamel, like Homo, while other great apes have markedly thinner enamel. Robust australopiths wore their molar surfaces down flat, unlike the more gracile species, who kept their crests.

== Diet ==
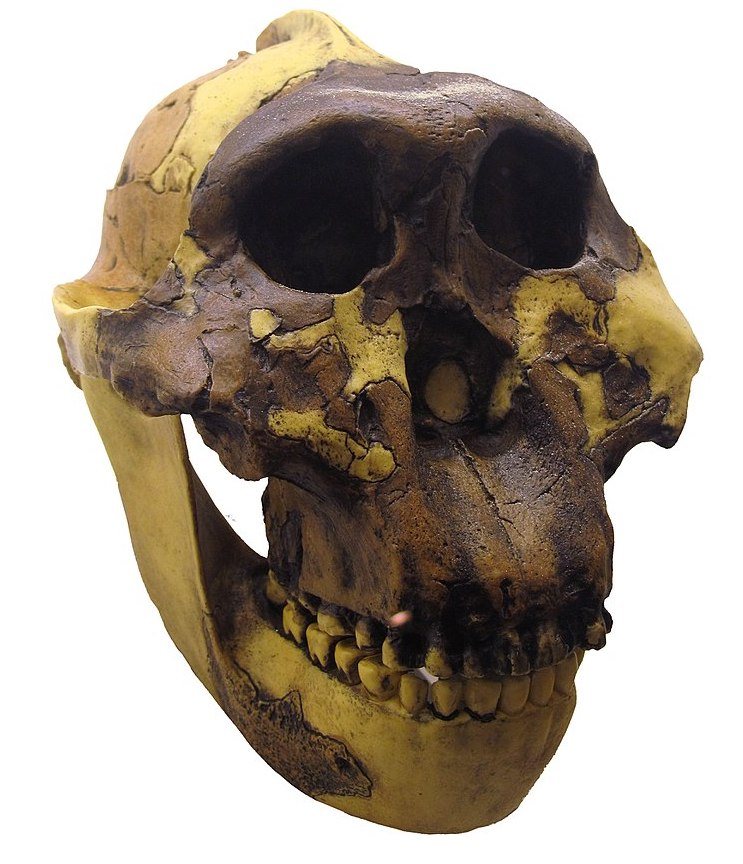
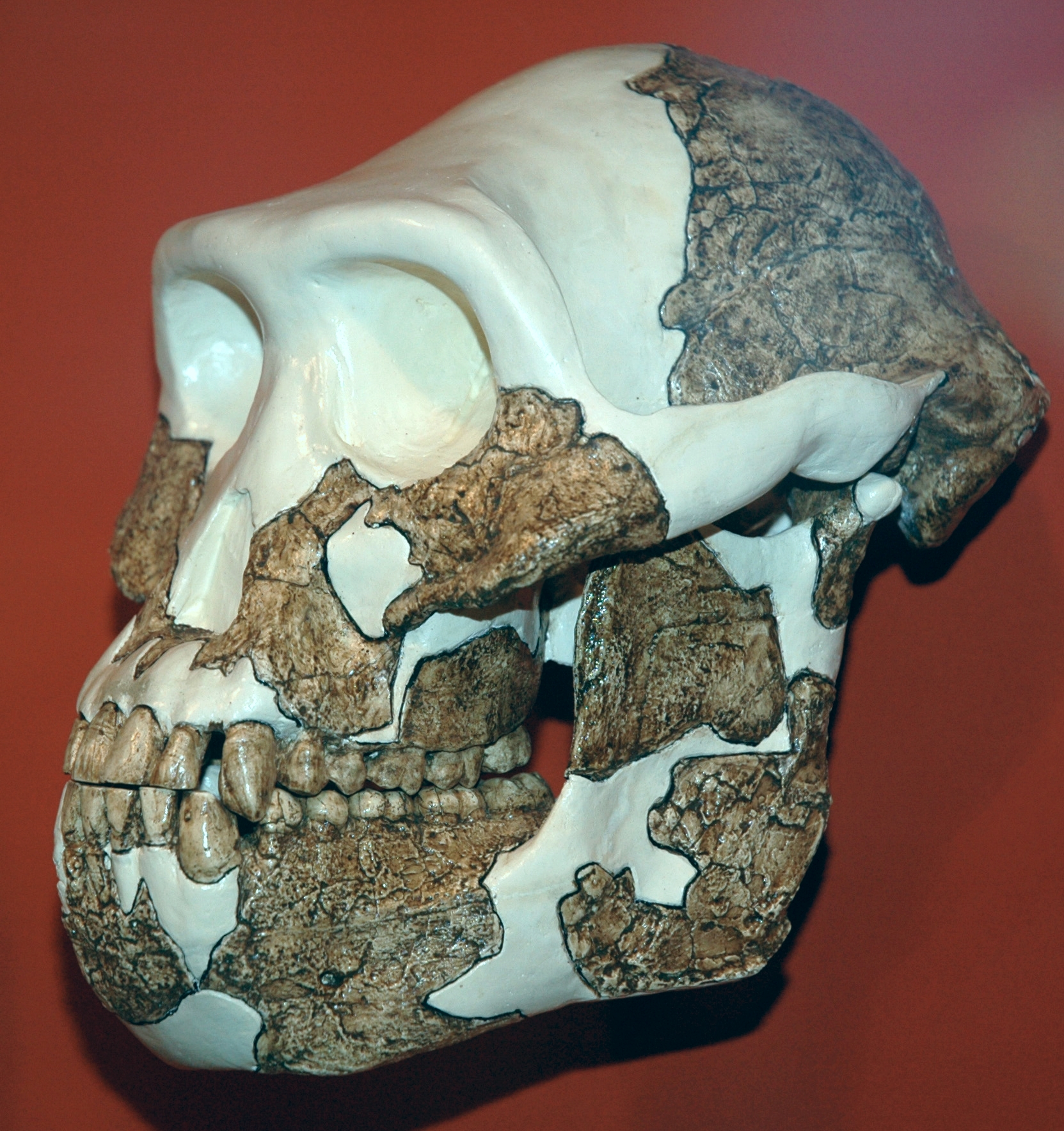
The robust Paranthropus boisei (left) vs the gracile A. anamensis (right)

In 2025, a study published in Science measured nitrogen isotope ratios in fossilized teeth and determined that Australopithecus was almost entirely vegetarian.

Australopithecus species are thought to have eaten mainly fruit, vegetables, and tubers, and perhaps easy-to-catch animals such as small lizards. Much research has focused on a comparison between the South African species A. africanus and Paranthropus robustus. Early analyses of dental microwear in these two species showed, compared to P. robustus, A. africanus had fewer microwear features and more scratches as opposed to pits on its molar wear facets. Microwear patterns on the cheek teeth of A. afarensis and A. anamensis indicate that A. afarensis predominantly ate fruits and leaves, whereas A. anamensis included grasses and seeds (in addition to fruits and leaves). The thickening of enamel in australopiths may have been a response to eating more ground-bound foods such as tubers, nuts, and cereal grains with gritty dirt and other small particulates which would wear away enamel. Gracile australopiths had larger incisors, which indicates tearing food was important, perhaps eating scavenged meat. Nonetheless, the wearing patterns on the teeth support a largely herbivorous diet.

In 1992, trace-element studies of the strontium/calcium ratios in robust australopith fossils suggested the possibility of animal consumption, as they did in 1994 using stable carbon isotopic analysis. In 2005, fossil animal bones with butchery marks dating to 2.6 million years old were found at the site of Gona, Ethiopia. This implies meat consumption by at least one of three species of hominins occurring around that time: A. africanus, A. garhi, and/or P. aethiopicus. In 2010, fossils of butchered animal bones dated 3.4 million years old were found in Ethiopia, close to regions where australopith fossils were found. However, a 2025 study measuring nitrogen isotope ratios in fossilized teeth determined that Australopithecus was almost entirely vegetarian.

Robust australopithecines (Paranthropus) had larger cheek teeth than gracile australopiths, possibly because robust australopithecines had more tough, fibrous plant material in their diets, whereas gracile australopiths ate more hard and brittle foods. However, such divergence in chewing adaptations may instead have been a response to fallback food availability. In leaner times, robust and gracile australopithecines may have turned to different low-quality foods (fibrous plants for the former, and hard food for the latter), but in more bountiful times, they had more variable and overlapping diets. In a 1979 preliminary microwear study of Australopithecus fossil teeth, anthropologist Alan Walker theorized that robust australopiths ate predominantly fruit (frugivory).

A study in 2018 found non-carious cervical lesions, caused by acid erosion, on the teeth of A. africanus, probably caused by consumption of acidic fruit.

== Technology ==
It is debated if the Australopithecus hand was anatomically capable of producing stone tools. A. garhi was associated with large mammal bones bearing evidence of processing by stone tools, which may indicate australopithecine tool production. Stone tools dating to roughly the same time as A. garhi (about 2.6 mya) were later discovered at the nearby Gona and Ledi-Geraru sites, but the appearance of Homo at Ledi-Geraru (LD 350-1) casts doubt on australopithecine authorship.

In 2010, cut marks dating to 3.4 mya on a bovid leg were found at the Dikika site, which were at first attributed to butchery by A. afarensis, but because the fossil came from a sandstone unit (and were modified by abrasive sand and gravel particles during the fossilisation process), the attribution to butchery is dubious.

In 2015, the Lomekwi culture was discovered at Lake Turkana dating to 3.3 mya, possibly attributable to Kenyanthropus or A. deyiremeda.

== Notable specimens ==
- KT-12/H1, an A. bahrelghazali mandibular fragment, discovered 1995 in Sahara, Chad
- AL 129-1, an A. afarensis knee joint, discovered 1973 in Hadar, Ethiopia
- Karabo, a juvenile male A. sediba, discovered in South Africa
- Laetoli footprints, preserved hominin footprints in Tanzania
- Lucy, a 40%-complete skeleton of a female A. afarensis, discovered 1974 in Hadar, Ethiopia
- Selam, remains of a three-year-old A. afarensis female, discovered in Dikika, Ethiopia
- MRD-VP-1/1, first skull of A. anamensis discovered in 2016 in Afar, Ethiopia.
- STS 5 (Mrs. Ples), the most complete skull of an A. africanus ever found in South Africa
- STS 14, remains of an A. africanus, discovered 1947 in Sterkfontein, South Africa
- STS 71, skull of an A. africanus, discovered 1947 in Sterkfontein, South Africa
- Taung Child, skull of a young A. africanus, discovered 1924 in Taung, South Africa

== Gallery ==
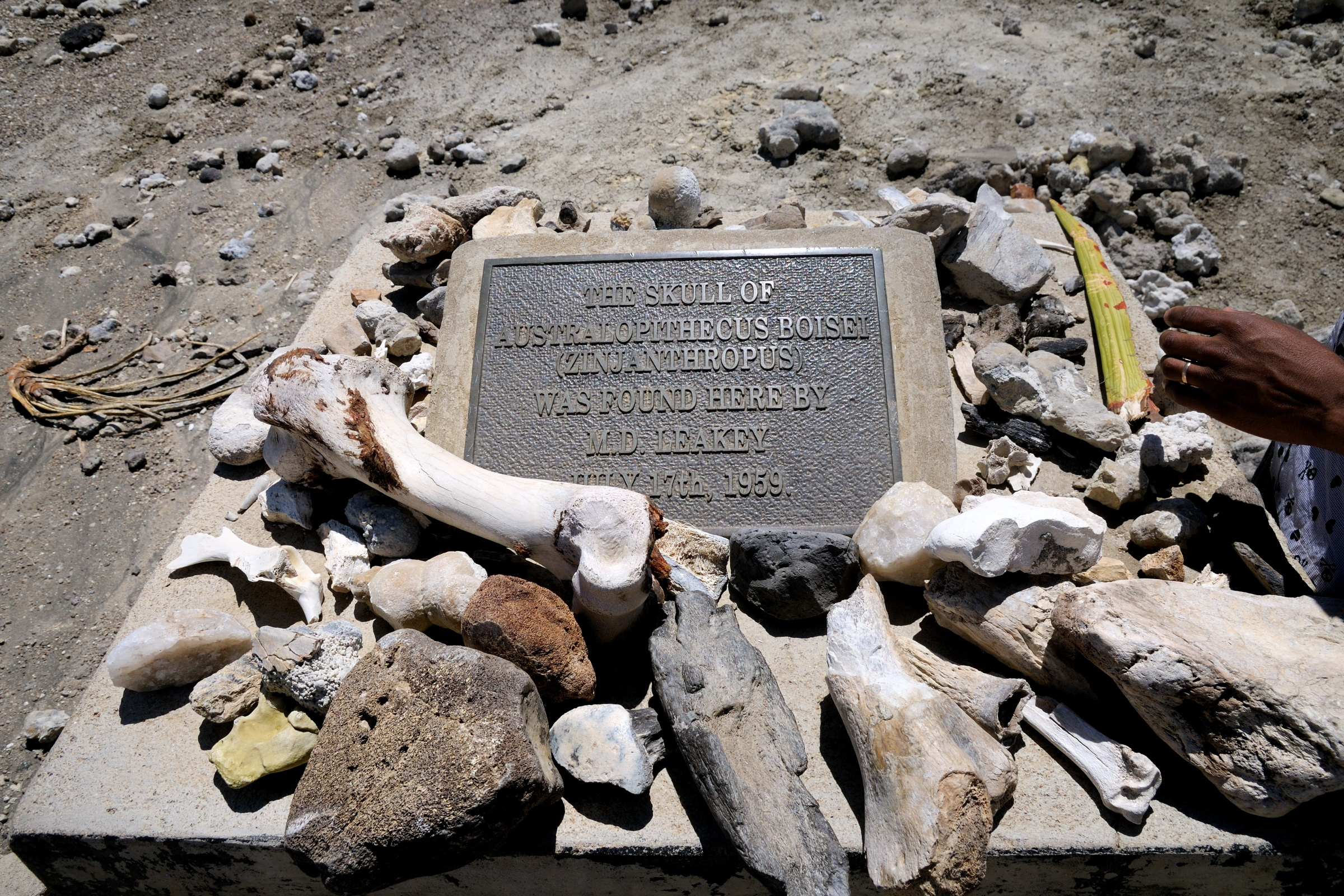
The spot where the first Australopithecus boisei was discovered in Tanzania.

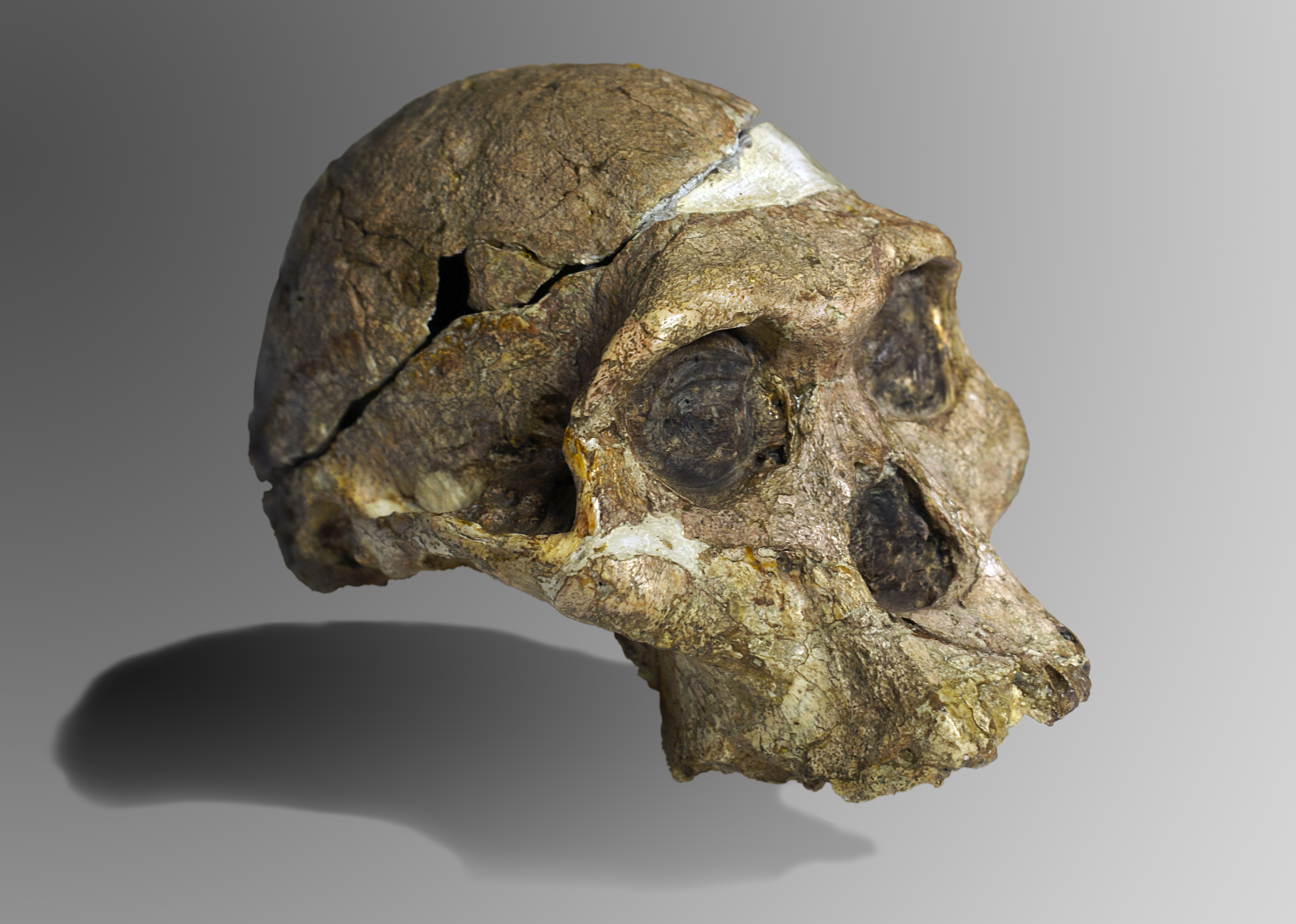
Original skull of Mrs. Ples, a female A. africanus

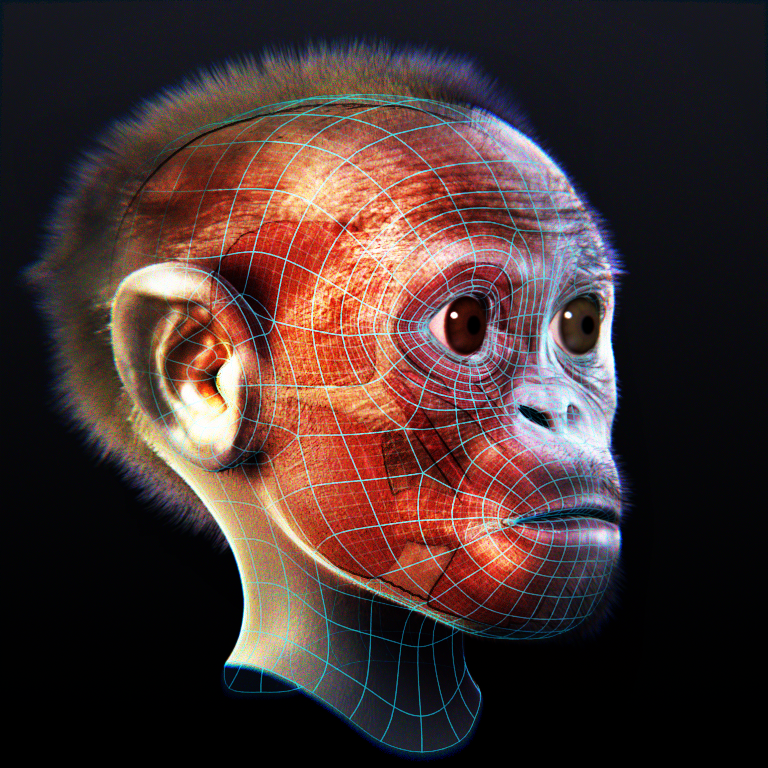
Taung Child by Cicero Moraes, Arc-Team, Antrocom NPO, Museum of the University of Padua.

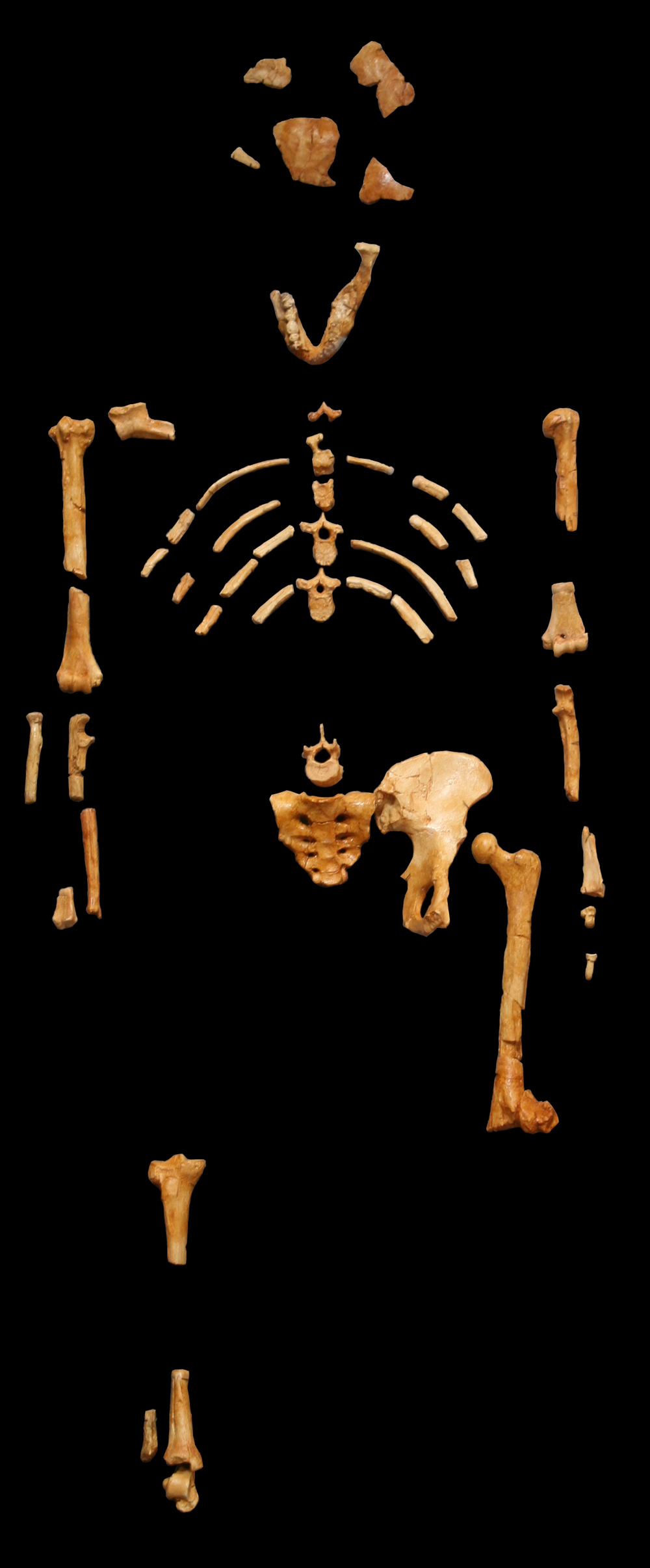
Cast of the skeleton of Lucy, an A. afarensis

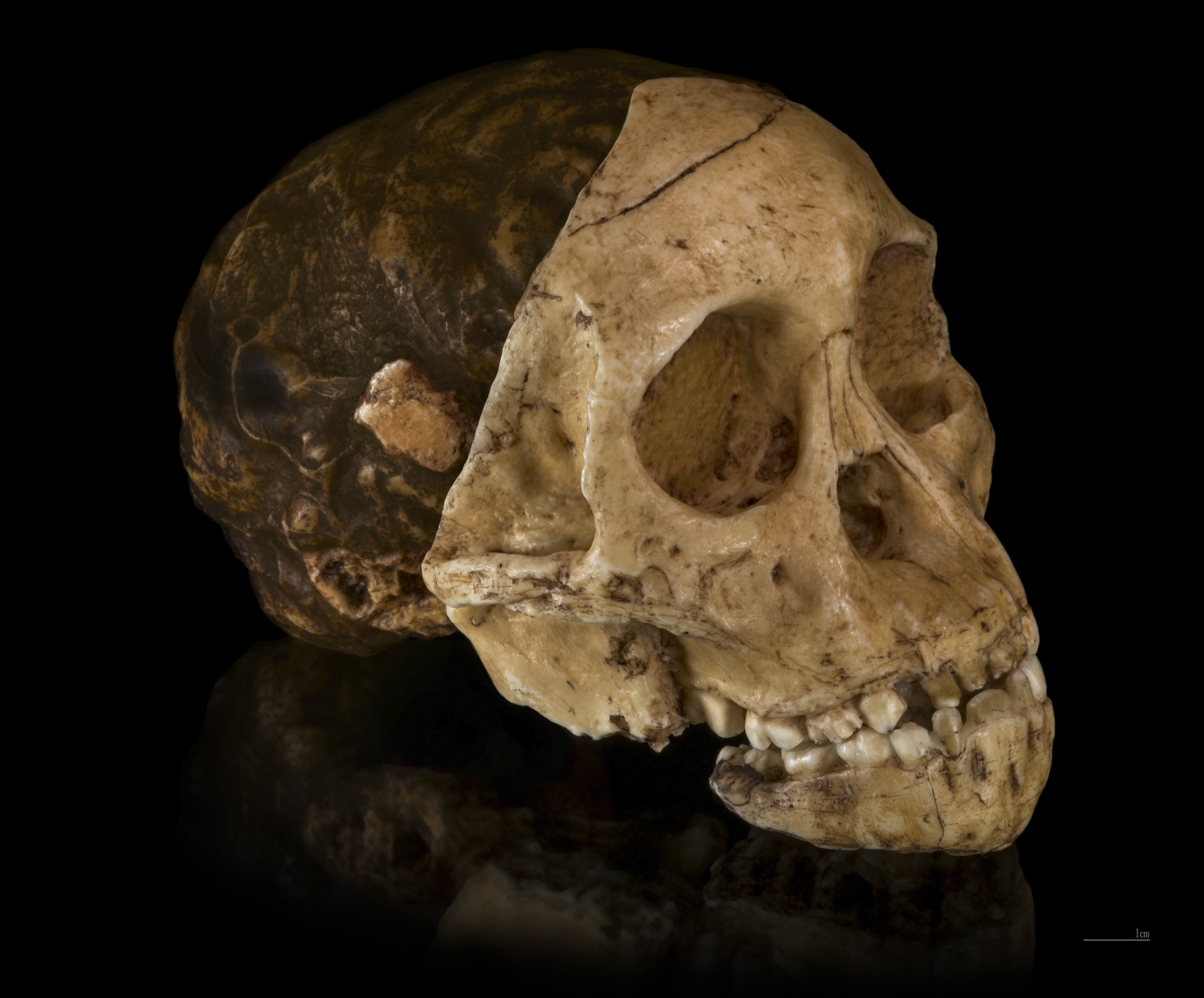
Skull of the Taung child

== See also ==
- Aramis, Ethiopia
- Ardipithecus
- Chimpanzee–human last common ancestor
- Homo habilis
- LD 350-1
- Little Foot
- List of fossil sites (with link directory)
- List of human evolution fossils (with images)
