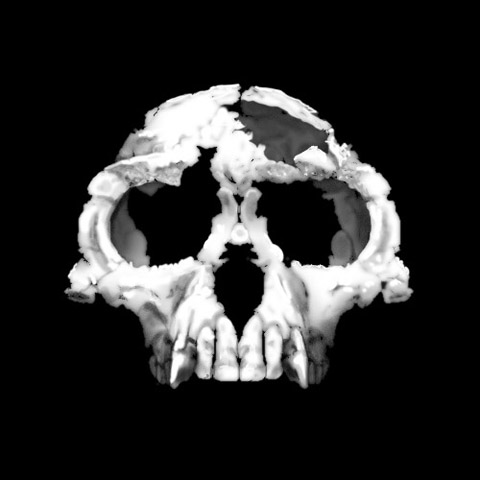
- Ardipithecus ramidus specimen, nicknamed Ardi

Scientific classification
- Kingdom: Animalia
- Phylum: Chordata
- Class: Mammalia
- Order: Primates
- Superfamily: Hominoidea
- Family: Hominidae
- Subtribe: Hominina
- Genus: †Ardipithecus; White et al., 1995

Type species
- †Ardipithecus ramidus (White, Suwa & Asfaw, 1994)

Species
- †Ardipithecus kadabba; †Ardipithecus ramidus

= Ardipithecus =

Ardipithecus Temporal range: Late Miocene – Early Pliocene, 5.77–4.4 Ma

Extinct genus of hominins

Ardipithecus is a genus of extinct hominine that lived during the Late Miocene and Early Pliocene epochs in the Afar Depression, Ethiopia. Originally described as one of the earliest ancestors of humans after they diverged from the last common ancestor shared with chimpanzees, the relation of this genus to human ancestors and whether it is a hominin is now a matter of debate. Two fossil species are described in the literature: A. ramidus, which lived about 4.4 million years ago during the early Pliocene, and A. kadabba, dated to approximately 5.6 million years ago (late Miocene). Initial behavioral analysis indicated that Ardipithecus could be very similar to chimpanzees; however, more recent analysis based on canine size and lack of canine sexual dimorphism indicates that Ardipithecus was characterised by reduced aggression, and that they more closely resemble bonobos.

Some analyses describe Australopithecus as being sister to Ardipithecus ramidus specifically. This means that Australopithecus is distinctly more closely related to Ardipithecus ramidus than Ardipithecus kadabba. Cladistically, then, Australopithecus (and eventually Homo sapiens) indeed emerged within the Ardipithecus lineage, and this lineage is not literally extinct.

== Ardipithecus ramidus ==
Hominin timeline
← / Earlier apes; ← / Gorilla split; ← / Chimpanzee split; ← / Earliest bipedal; ← / Earliest sign of Ardipithecus; ← / Earliest sign of Australopithecus; ← / Earliest stone tools; ← / Earliest sign of Homo; ← / Dispersal beyond Africa; ← / Earliest fire / cooking; ← / Earliest rock art; ← / Earliest clothes; ← / Modern humans
(million years ago)

A. ramidus was named in September 1994. The first fossil found was dated to 4.4 million years ago on the basis of its stratigraphic position between two volcanic strata: the basal Gaala Tuff Complex (G.A.T.C.) and the Daam Aatu Basaltic Tuff (D.A.B.T.). The name Ardipithecus ramidus stems mostly from the Afar language, in which Ardi means "ground/floor" and ramid means "root". The pithecus portion of the name is from the Greek word for "ape".

Like most hominids, but unlike all previously recognized hominins, it had a grasping hallux or big toe adapted for locomotion in the trees. It is not confirmed how many other features of its skeleton reflect adaptation to bipedalism on the ground as well. Like later hominins, Ardipithecus had reduced canine teeth and reduced canine sexual dimorphism.

In 1992–1993 a research team headed by Tim White discovered the first A. ramidus fossils—seventeen fragments including skull, mandible, teeth and arm bones—from the Afar Depression in the Middle Awash river valley of Ethiopia. More fragments were recovered in 1994, amounting to 45% of the total skeleton. This fossil was originally described as a species of Australopithecus, but White and his colleagues later published a note in the same journal renaming the fossil under a new genus, Ardipithecus. Between 1999 and 2003, a multidisciplinary team led by Sileshi Semaw discovered bones and teeth of nine A. ramidus individuals at As Duma in the Gona area of Ethiopia's Afar Region. The fossils were dated to between 4.35 and 4.45 million years old.

Map showing discovery locations.

Ardipithecus ramidus had a small brain, measuring between 300 and 350 cm^{3}. This is slightly smaller than a modern bonobo or chimpanzee brain, but much smaller than the brain of australopithecines like Lucy (~400 to 550 cm^{3}) and roughly 20% the size of the modern Homo sapiens brain. Like common chimpanzees, A. ramidus was much more prognathic than modern humans.

The teeth of A. ramidus lacked the specialization of other apes, and suggest that it was a generalized omnivore and frugivore (fruit eater) with a diet that did not depend heavily on foliage, fibrous plant material (roots, tubers, etc.), or hard and or abrasive food. The size of the upper canine tooth in A. ramidus males was not distinctly different from that of females. Their upper canines were less sharp than those of modern common chimpanzees in part because of this decreased upper canine size, as larger upper canines can be honed through wear against teeth in the lower mouth. The features of the upper canine in A. ramidus contrast with the sexual dimorphism observed in common chimpanzees, where males have significantly larger and sharper upper canine teeth than females. Of the living apes, bonobos have the smallest canine sexual dimorphism, although still greater than that displayed by A. ramidus.

The less pronounced nature of the upper canine teeth in A. ramidus has been used to infer aspects of the social behavior of the species and more ancestral hominids. In particular, it has been used to suggest that the last common ancestor of hominids and African apes was characterized by relatively little aggression between males and between groups. This is markedly different from social patterns in common chimpanzees, among which intermale and intergroup aggression are typically high. Researchers in a 2009 study said that this condition "compromises the living chimpanzee as a behavioral model for the ancestral hominid condition." Bonobo canine size and canine sexual dimorphism more closely resembles that of A. ramidus, and as a result, bonobos are now suggested as a behavioural model.

A. ramidus existed more recently than the most recent common ancestor of humans and chimpanzees (CLCA or Pan-Homo LCA) and thus is not fully representative of that common ancestor. Nevertheless, it is in some ways unlike chimpanzees, suggesting that the common ancestor differs from the modern chimpanzee. After the chimpanzee and human lineages diverged, both underwent substantial evolutionary change. Chimp feet are specialized for grasping trees; A. ramidus feet are better suited for walking. The canine teeth of A. ramidus are smaller, and equal in size between males and females, which suggests reduced male-to-male conflict, increased pair-bonding, and increased parental investment. "Thus, fundamental reproductive and social behavioral changes probably occurred in hominids long before they had enlarged brains and began to use stone tools," the research team concluded.

=== Ardi ===
On October 1, 2009, paleontologists formally announced the discovery of the relatively complete A. ramidus fossil skeleton first unearthed in 1994. The fossil is the remains of a small-brained 50-kilogram (110 lb) female, nicknamed "Ardi", and includes most of the skull and teeth, as well as the pelvis, hands, and feet. It was discovered in Ethiopia's harsh Afar desert at a site called Aramis in the Middle Awash region. Radiometric dating of the layers of volcanic ash encasing the deposits suggest that Ardi lived about 4.3 to 4.5 million years ago. This date, however, has been questioned by others. Fleagle and Kappelman suggest that the region in which Ardi was found is difficult to date radiometrically, and they argue that Ardi should be dated at 3.9 million years.

The fossil is regarded by its describers as shedding light on a stage of human evolution about which little was known, more than a million years before Lucy (Australopithecus afarensis), the iconic early human ancestor candidate who lived 3.2 million years ago, and was discovered in 1974 just 74 km (46 mi) away from Ardi's discovery site. However, because the "Ardi" skeleton is no more than 200,000 years older than the earliest fossils of Australopithecus, and may in fact be younger than they are, some researchers doubt that it can represent a direct ancestor of Australopithecus.

Some researchers infer from the form of her pelvis and limbs and the presence of her abductable hallux, that "Ardi" was a facultative biped: bipedal when moving on the ground, but quadrupedal when moving about in tree branches. A. ramidus had a more primitive walking ability than later hominids, and could not walk or run for long distances. The teeth suggest omnivory, and are more generalised than those of modern apes.

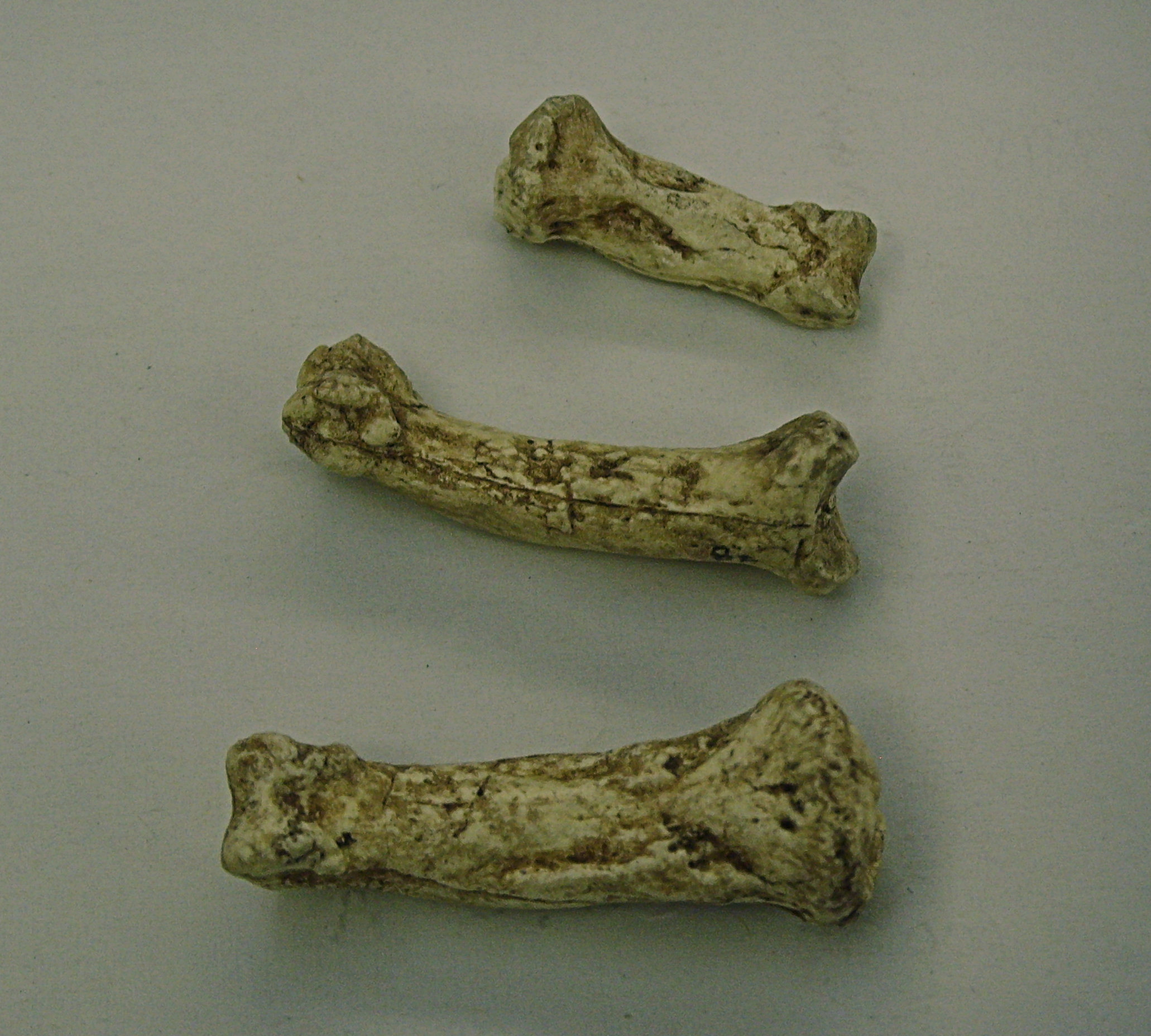
Casts of Ardi's finger bones

== Ardipithecus kadabba ==
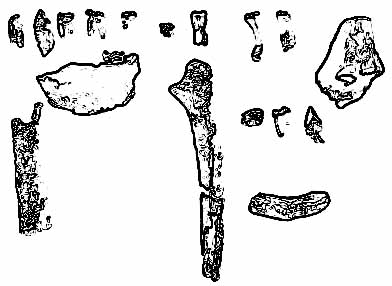
Ardipithecus kadabba fossils

Ardipithecus kadabba is "known only from teeth and bits and pieces of skeletal bones", and is dated to approximately 5.6 million years ago. It has been described as a "probable chronospecies" (i.e. ancestor) of A. ramidus. Although originally considered a subspecies of A. ramidus, in 2004 anthropologists Yohannes Haile-Selassie, Gen Suwa, and Tim D. White published an article elevating A. kadabba to species level on the basis of newly discovered teeth from Ethiopia. These teeth show "primitive morphology and wear pattern" which demonstrate that A. kadabba is a distinct species from A. ramidus.

The specific name comes from the Afar word for "basal family ancestor".

== Classification ==
Due to several shared characteristics with chimpanzees, its closeness to ape divergence period, and due to its fossil incompleteness, the exact position of Ardipithecus in the fossil record is a subject of controversy. Primatologist Esteban Sarmiento had systematically compared and concluded that there is not sufficient anatomical evidence to support an exclusively human lineage. Sarmiento noted that Ardipithecus does not share any characteristics exclusive to humans, and some of its characteristics (those in the wrist and basicranium) suggest it diverged from humans prior to the human–gorilla last common ancestor. His comparative (narrow allometry) study in 2011 on the molar and body segment lengths (which included living primates of similar body size) noted that some dimensions including short upper limbs, and metacarpals are reminiscent of humans, but other dimensions such as long toes and relative molar surface area are great ape-like. Sarmiento concluded that such length measures can change back and forth during evolution and are not very good indicators of relatedness (homoplasy).

However, some later studies still argue for its classification in the human lineage. In 2014, it was reported that the hand bones of Ardipithecus, Australopithecus sediba and A. afarensis have the third metacarpal styloid process, which is absent in other apes. Unique brain organisations (such as lateral shift of the carotid foramina, mediolateral abbreviation of the lateral tympanic, and a shortened, trapezoidal basioccipital element) in Ardipithecus are also found only in the Australopithecus and Homo. Comparison of the tooth root morphology with those of the earlier Sahelanthropus also indicated strong resemblance, also pointing to inclusion to the human line.

Evolutionary tree according to a 2019 study:

- Hominini
  - Chimpanzee
  - Sahelanthropus
    - - Ardipithecus
      - Au. anamensis
        Au. afarensis
    - - Paranthropus
        - P. aethiopicus
        - - P. boisei
          - P. robustus
      - - Au. africanus
        - Au. garhi
          - H. floresiensis
          - - Au. sediba
            - - H. habilis
              - Other Homo

== Palaeobiology ==
=== Locomotion ===
The Ardipithecus length measures are good indicators of function and together with dental isotope data and the fauna and flora from the fossil site indicate Ardipithecus was mainly a terrestrial quadruped collecting a large portion of its food on the ground. Its arboreal behaviors would have been limited and suspension from branches solely from the upper limbs rare. According to Scott Simpson, the Gona Project's physical anthropologist, the fossil evidence from the Middle Awash indicates that both A. kadabba and A. ramidus lived in "a mosaic of woodland and grasslands with lakes, swamps and springs nearby," but further research is needed to determine which habitat Ardipithecus at Gona preferred.

=== Diet ===
A comparative study in 2013 on carbon and oxygen stable isotopes within modern and fossil tooth enamel revealed that Ardipithecus fed both arboreally (on trees) and on the ground in a more open habitat, unlike chimpanzees. Ardipithecus may have occasionally preyed on animals smaller than itself, as chimpanzees do, but it almost certainly never hunted megaherbivores, and it was unlikely to have influence megaherbivore abundance and diversity patterns in any way.

=== Paedomorphism ===
In 2015, Australian anthropologists Gary Clark and Maciej Henneberg said that Ardipithecus adults have a facial anatomy more similar to chimpanzee subadults than adults, with a less-projecting face and smaller canines (large canines in primate males are used to compete within mating hierarchies), and attributed this to a decrease in craniofacial growth in favour of brain growth. This is only seen in humans, so they argued that the species may show the first trend towards human social, parenting and sexual psychology. Previously, it was assumed that such ancient human ancestors behaved much like chimps, but this is no longer considered to be a viable comparison. This view has yet to be corroborated by more detailed studies of the growth of A. ramidus. The study also provides support for Stephen Jay Gould's theory in Ontogeny and Phylogeny that the paedomorphic (childlike) form of early hominin craniofacial morphology results from dissociation of growth trajectories.

=== Communication ===
Clark and Henneberg also argued that such shortening of the skull—which may have caused a descension of the larynx—as well as lordosis—allowing better movement of the larynx—increased vocal ability, significantly pushing back the origin of language to well before the evolution of Homo. They argued that self domestication was aided by the development of vocalization, living in a pro-social society. They conceded that chimps and A. ramidus likely had the same vocal capabilities, but said that A. ramidus made use of more complex vocalizations, and vocalized at the same level as a human infant due to selective pressure to become more social. This would have allowed their society to become more complex. They also noted that the base of the skull stopped growing with the brain by the end of juvenility, whereas in chimps it continues growing with the rest of the body into adulthood; and considered this evidence of a switch from a gross skeletal anatomy trajectory to a neurological development trajectory due to selective pressure for sociability. Nonetheless, their conclusions are highly speculative.

=== Giant snake predation ===
Indigenous people living where large boas and pythons occur are well within the prey size range of those species; an adult male Aeta would constitute greater than or equal to 60% of the mass of a large female reticulated python, which is not a heavy meal by snake standards and especially not for a species whose natural diet includes pigs weighing up to 60 kg. Plio-Plestiocene hominins before the divergence of Homo erectus and reaching back to Ardipithecus ramidus averaged 30-52 kg in mass and thus, making them comparably susceptible to giant snake predation.

== See also ==
- Australopithecus
- Paranthropus
- Graecopithecus
- List of human evolution fossils
- Orrorin
- Sahelanthropus
