= Ardi =

Fossilized remains of a human-like hominim

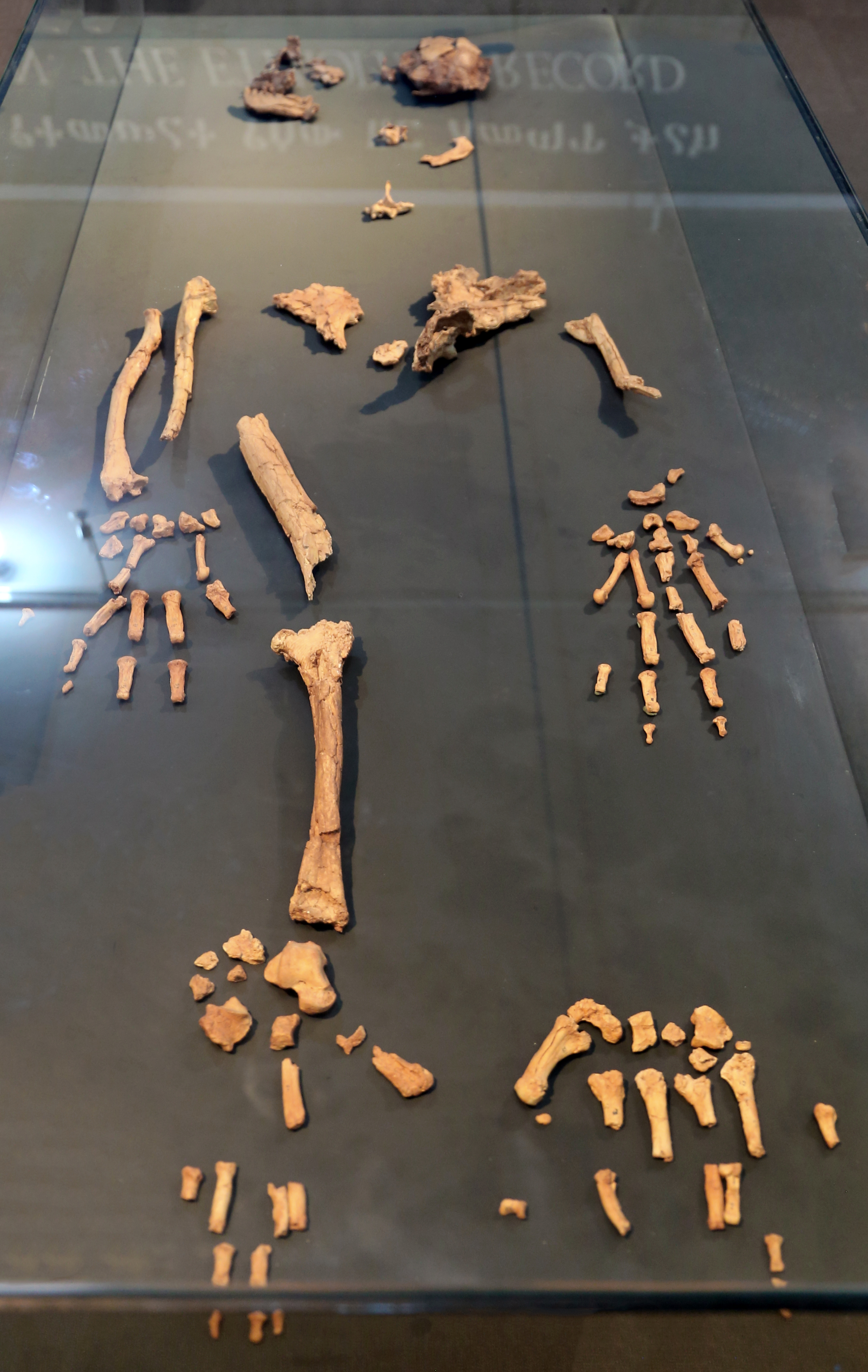
- The fossilized bones of "Ardi"
- Common name: Ardi
- Species: Ardipithecus ramidus
- Age: 4.4 million years
- Place discovered: Afar, Ethiopia
- Date discovered: 1994
- Discovered by: Yohannes Haile-Selassie

Ardi (ARA-VP-6/500) is the designation of the fossilized skeletal remains of an Ardipithecus ramidus, thought to be an early human-like female anthropoid around 4.4 million years old. Before Little Foot was fully excavated, it was considered the most complete early hominin specimen with 125 pieces, including most of the skull, teeth, pelvis, hands, and feet.

== Discovery ==
The Ardi skeleton was discovered at Aramis in the arid badlands near the Awash River in Ethiopia in 1994 by college student Yohannes Haile-Selassie, when he uncovered a partial piece of a hand bone. The discovery was made by a team of scientists led by UC Berkeley anthropologist Tim White, and was analyzed by an international group of scientists that included Claude Lovejoy heading the biology team. On 1 October 2009, the journal Science published an open-access collection of eleven articles, detailing many aspects of Ardipithecus ramidus and its environment. Her fossils were also found near animal remains which indicated that she inhabited a forest type of environment, contrary to the theory that bipedalism originated in savannahs.

Ardi was not the first fossil of Ardipithecus ramidus to come to light. The first ones were found in Ethiopia in 1992, but it took 17 years to assess their significance.

== Etymology ==
The word Ardi means "ground floor" and the word ramid means "root" in Afar, suggesting that Ardi lived on the ground and was the root of the family tree of humanity.

== Description ==
Hominin timeline
← / Earlier apes; ← / Gorilla split; ← / Chimpanzee split; ← / Earliest bipedal; ← / Earliest sign of Ardipithecus; ← / Earliest sign of Australopithecus; ← / Earliest stone tools; ← / Earliest sign of Homo; ← / Dispersal beyond Africa; ← / Earliest fire / cooking; ← / Earliest rock art; ← / Earliest clothes; ← / Modern humans
(million years ago)

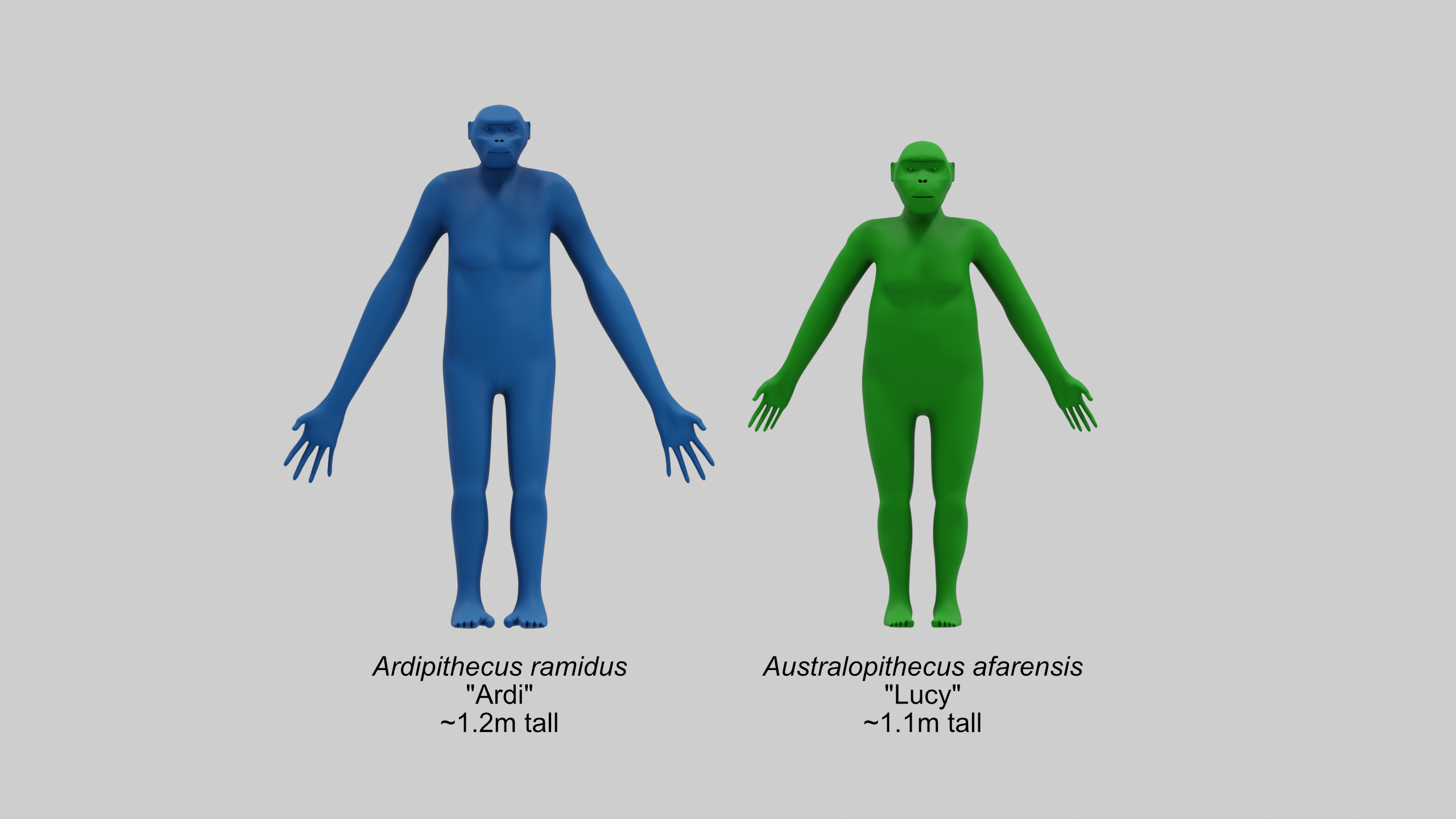
3D models of "Ardi" and "Lucy"

Ardi weighed around 50 kg (110 lb), and around 1.2 m (3.9 ft) tall. Although she is a biped, Ardi had both opposable big toes and thumbs in order to climb trees. It is speculated that her bipedality impeded movement, but enabled her to bear more offspring.

Although it is not yet clear how Ardi's species is related to Humans, the discovery is of great significance and added much to the debate on Ardipithecus and its place in human evolution. With regards to Ardi's body composition, archaeologists note that she is unique in that she possesses traits that are characteristic of both extinct primates and early hominids. It is still a point of debate whether Ardi was capable of bipedal movement. Ardi's divergent big toes are not characteristic of a biped. However, the found remains of her legs, feet, pelvis, and hands suggested that she walked upright when on the ground but was a quadruped when moving around trees. Her big toe, for example, spreads out quite a bit from her foot to better grasp tree limbs. Unlike chimpanzees, however, her foot contains a unique small bone inside a tendon which kept the big toe stronger. When seen along with Ardi's other bone structures, this unique bone would have helped her walk bipedally, though less efficiently than Lucy. Her wrist bones also provided her with flexibility but the palm bones were short. This suggests that Ardi did not walk on her knuckles and only used her palms to move along tree branches.

Some of Ardi's teeth are still connected to her jawbone and show enamel wear suggesting a diet consisting of fruit and nuts. The canine teeth of A. ramidus are smaller, and equal in size between males and females. This suggests reduced male-to-male conflict, pair-bonding, and increased parental investment. "Thus fundamental reproductive and social behavioral changes probably occurred in hominids long before they had enlarged brains and began to use stone tools."

== Pelvis ==
Although Ardipithecus had more ancestral hands, feet, and limbs, Ardi's pelvis gives a different perspective. The parts of Ardi's pelvis that were recovered include her left hip, her right ilium, and a fragment of her distal sacrum. A shorter ilium and a curve in the lower spine were the characteristics gathered from these partial remains that indicate Ardi, and the Ardipithecus ramidus species, had the ability to walk upright. The shift to bipedality is only beginning to emerge in Ardi because there are characteristics in Ardi's pelvis that are both found in all later hominids and characteristics that are found in extant African apes. A characteristic that is found in Ardi and in all later hominids is a separate growth site for the anterior inferior iliac spine. A similar ischial structure is a characteristic found in Ardi and in extant African apes. This mixture of characteristics indicates Ardi's bipedality was an earlier version of bipedalism compared to later hominids like Lucy. Regardless of how ancestral Ardi's bipedality was, these characteristics found in Ardi's pelvis show bipedalism was well underway by around 4.4 million years ago, even with the ability for arboreal locomotion still present in the hands and limbs.

== Foot ==
Ardi's foot is a special area of interest when examining the evolution of bipedalism in early Hominids, and the bipedality of Ardipithecus ramidus, because all five toes do not line up. The remains of the foot from Ardi and other Ardipithecus ramidus specimens that can be studied includes "a talus, medial and intermediate cuneiforms, cuboid, first, second, third, and fifth metatarsals, and several phalanges." The foot of Ardi contains an opposable hallux (big toe) that is similar to chimpanzees. This opposable hallux is believed to have been used to aid in tree climbing. On the outside, Ardi's foot may look like it belongs with other Apes, but on the inside, Ardi's foot contains a bone called the os peroneum, which allows the bottom of the foot to be more rigid. The rigidity of the bottom of the foot was believed to allow Ardi to walk upright, and the other four toes that were aligned performed the "toe off" action during a bipedal motion. The combination of features found in Ardi's and other Ardipithecus ramidus foot bones captures a moment in time where these primitive primates were beginning to leave the trees and spending longer periods of time on the ground.

== See also ==
- Lucy – 3.2-million-year-old fossilized hominid
