= Gona, Ethiopia =

Archaeological site

- Gona Research Project area
- Location of Gona in Ethiopia
- 12°14′00″N 39°14′00″E
- Type: Archaeological
- Location: North Wollo, Amhara Region, Ethiopia
- Region: Eastern Africa, Great Rift Valley

Gona is a paleoanthropological research area in Ethiopia's Afar Region. Gona is primarily known for its archaeological sites and discoveries of hominin fossils from the Late Miocene, Early Pliocene and Early Pleistocene. Fossils of Ardipithecus and Homo erectus were discovered there. Two of the most significant finds are an Ardipithecus ramidus postcranial skeleton and an essentially complete Homo erectus pelvis. Historically, Gona had the oldest documented Oldowan artifact assemblages. Archaeologists have since found older examples of the Oldowan at other sites. Still, Gona's Oldowan assemblages have been essential to the archaeological understanding of the Oldowan. Gona's Acheulean archaeological sites have helped us understand the beginnings of the Acheulean Industry.

== History ==
Paleoanthropological interest in the locality that would eventually become the Gona Paleoanthropological Research Project area began after a French geologist, Maurice Taieb, undertook a geological reconnaissance survey of the Afar Rift in the late 1960s. This initial research led to an archaeological survey of the area around the Kada Gona River. During the survey, the researchers found artifact-bearing deposits. The first excavation occurred in the West part of the Gona Project area in 1976; this site has since been named WG1. In the early 1980s, the Ethiopian government passed a moratorium on archaeological fieldwork. In 1987, the newly established People's Democratic Republic of Ethiopia allowed archaeological fieldwork to resume. This decision permitted Selshi Semaw to conduct his first survey of Gona's archaeological sites. Soon after this initial survey, Semaw initiated the Gona Paleoanthropological Research Project.

The first systemic excavations of Gona sites by Semaw and his colleagues took place between 1992 and 1994. Two sites they excavated during this period, East Gona 10 (EG-10) and East Gona 12 (EG-12), yielded a high density of artifacts attributed to the Oldowan stone tool industry. The artifacts from these sites were eventually dated to 2.6 Ma (million years ago) using radiometric dating and magnetostratigraphy.

Only a few years after the initial publication of the East Gona sites, Semaw and colleagues described two new sites in the Ounda Gona South area, Ounda Gona South 6 (OGS-6) and Ounda Gona South 7 (OGS-7) dated to 2.6 Ma. OGS-6 and OGS-7 are important sites for understanding the early Oldowan because the stone tool assemblages were associated with fossilized animal bones with cut marks on their surfaces. Up to this point in the early 2000s, very little archaeological evidence was available to corroborate many archaeologists' theory that hominins used early Oldowan stone tools for processing animal carcasses to obtain meat.

Gona was widely known for many years as the site with the oldest Oldowan artifacts. However, in 2019 the results from an excavation at the Bokol-Dora 1 site in the Ledi-Geraru Research Project area in the Ethiopian Lower Awash Valley were published. The excavation at Bokol-Dora 1 recovered Oldowan artifacts that are between 2.61 and 2.58 Ma. The archaeologists who published on this site suggest that the artifacts are closer to 2.58 Ma. However, there has been some controversy regarding this date. Then, in 2023, a report from an excavation at Nyayanga, Kenya, on the Homa Peninsula found Oldowan artifacts in sediment dated 3.032 to 2.581 Ma. With two assemblages with earlier dates for their Oldowan artifacts, archaeologists do not think the Gona Oldowan assemblages are the oldest documented instance of the Oldowan. Even though the Oldowan artifact assemblages from Gona are not the oldest, they are still significant because they help researchers understand hominin behavior.

== Geography ==
The Gona Paleoanthropological Research Project is a 500 square kilometres (190 sq mi) area of badlands within the west-central part of Ethiopia's Afar Region. The southernmost boundary of the project area is the Asbole River. The northernmost is the Bati-Mille Road. The Eastern border is the Hadar Research Project area. The Western Ethiopian Escarpment forms the westernmost extent of the project area. There are five major tributaries of the Awash River in the Gona Research Project area from northernmost to southernmost: the Kada Gona, the Ounda Gona, the Dana Aoule, the Busidima River, and the Asbole River. Most of Gona's sites are near these five rivers, so many of the sites in the project area are named based on the tributary they are closest to and the cardinal direction of the site related to the river. For example, sites south of the Ounda Gona are called Ounda Gona South (OGS), followed by the site number.

== Paleoanthropology ==
Hominin fossils from Gona are used by palaeoanthropologists studying human evolution in the Late Miocene, Early Pliocene and Early Pleistocene.

=== Ardipithecus ===
Researchers collected several fossil teeth attributed to Ardipithecus kadabba in two different localities: the Escarpment and Asbole Dora. The fossils were dated using their stratigraphic location within the Adu-Asa Formation, which dates to the Miocene. The fossils from the Escarpment are approximately 5.4 million years old, and those from Asbole Dora are around 6.3 million. The age of these teeth situates them within the time frame of the speciation of the chimpanzee and human lineages. When researchers analyzed these teeth, they had features associated with the pattern in later hominin dentition. These observations help reconstruct a crucial time in hominin evolution for which very little evidence is available.

Ardipithecus ramidus fossils have been collected from Early Pliocene sediments at multiple localities in the Gona Western Margin area. These localities are associated with the As Duma fault. The fossils were dated using the established geochronology for the project area, argon-argon dating, and additional non-hominin fossils from the same period. The date range for these fossils is between 4.8 and 4.32 million years ago. Most of the fossils are fragments that are not associated with a single individual. These fossils consist of isolated teeth, parts of the maxilla, mandible, and postcranial bones from the hands, feet, and lower leg. The Gona Western Margin 67 locality is unique because researchers think the fossils found are from a single individual. They believe they are from a single individual because none of the bones have duplicates, and the elements' size and level of preservation are consistent. The majority of the elements of the skeleton collected are from the feet and legs. One of the main questions that paleoanthropologists want to understand is how bipedalism evolved. Ar. ramidus has adaptations for walking on two legs but retains a lot of adaptations for arboreality. The Gona Western Margin 67 individual has helped researchers understand how Ar. ramidus walked on two legs. Particularly how variation in anatomy impacted the way they walked.

=== Homo erectus ===
Researchers also have found Homo erectus fossils in the Gona project area. At Busidima North 49 (BSN49), paleoanthropologists found an adult female's lumbar vertebra and an almost complete pelvis. This locality of the Gona project area is part of the Busidima geological formation. Geologists used sediment accumulation for the formation to narrow the range of dates. The fossil is likely from between 1.4 and 0.9 million years ago. This fossil is significant in the paleoanthropological community because there are very few pelvic H. erectus fossils, and this fossil pelvis is essentially complete. There is a specific research question in human evolution known as the obstetric dilemma, where the female pelvis had to develop novel adaptations to accommodate the large size of the neonatal head due to the expansion of the brain during human evolution. Before collecting and describing this fossil, researchers thought that H. erectus did not have modifications in the pelvis to account for the larger brain size of their babies. However, this conclusion was based on estimating the shape of the H. erectus birth canal from the Turkana Boy fossil because that was what was available then. Simpson and colleagues were able to describe specific modifications in the Gona pelvis related to changing the size and shape of the birth canal in modern humans, which proved that H. erectus did have adaptations in the anatomy of their pelvis for giving birth to larger-brained offspring.

Two other H. erectus fossils were parts of the skull found at different archaeological sites. The earlier site, Dana Aoule North 5 (DAN5), is dated between 1.6 and 1.5 Ma. Busidima North 12 (BSN12) is younger. It dates to 1.26 Ma. The DAN5 H. erectus cranium was small and gracile. In contrast, the BSN12 skull was more robust and larger. Initially, researchers suggested that the differences in the two skulls resulted from sexual dimorphism and that the smaller skull was a female. But findings from further investigations did not support this claim. These researchers thought that the size and shape differences of the two fossil skulls were related to the expansion of H. erectus brain size over time and not sexual dimorphism.

== Geology ==
=== Geological setting ===
The Gona Paleoanthropological Research Project is within the Afar Triangle, a geological depression created by the East African Rift system. The site is a classic rift basin formed via rifting and volcanism. The As Duma fault is a major geological feature in the project area, which forms the western half of the Awash half-graben. The Adu-asa formation shows the most volcanic activity and volcanic rocks dominate its sediments. The Sangatole and Hadar formations have a decreased level of volcanic activity and an increase in sedimentation rates. The Busidima formation shows a decrease in sedimentation, evidence of a drainage system, and a large river. Sedimentation ended after 0.16 Ma when the Awash River incised the area. The incision of the Awash River created badlands that characterize the project area today.

=== Geochronology ===
Gona's geochronology
Geological formation	Age (Ma)
Busidima Formation	2.7 - < 0.15
Hadar Formation	3.9 - 2.9
Sagantole Formation	< 5.2 - 3.9
Adu-asa Formation	> 6.4 - 5.2

Gona's geological formations span the last 6.4 million years. The dates for the archaeological sites and fossils from Gona rely on the project area's established geochronology and detailed stratigraphy. Geologists used tephrostratigraphy, paleomagnetic dating, and argon-argon dating to construct Gona's geochronology.

== Archaeology ==
=== Oldowan technological behavior ===
The Oldowan assemblages from Gona play a significant role in research seeking to understand the technological behavior of Oldowan tool makers. Technological behavior describes actions related to producing and using a particular technology, such as Oldowan artifacts. Stone knapping follows the principles of conchoidal fracture mechanics. Flaking must be approached in a specific way to achieve the desired outcome of the tool maker. The desired result of Oldowan stone tools was to create a sharp cutting edge. The tool maker would have to make a series of technical choices to make a sharp cutting-edge during manufacturing. They needed to select an appropriate raw material with a structure amenable to conchoidal fracture. They would have chosen a particular knapping technique, which in most cases would be hard hammer percussion. They would employ a specific reduction strategy, which is the pattern of how they reduced the core to create flakes. Archaeologists are interested in these choices because looking at the variation in these choices allows researchers to form inferences about why this variation occurs. These inferences inform the goal of this type of archaeological research, which is to understand the relationship between tool use and hominin biological evolution.

Using the manufacturing choices of hominins to try and understand higher-order questions about human evolution requires qualifying the choices as intentional behavior. Archaeologists in this field widely accept that Oldowan hominins selected specific raw materials. Gona's Pliocene archaeological sites provide an example of this selectivity. Oldowan archaeological sites at Gona are all closely associated with the paleo-Awash suggesting that hominins did not range outside of the paleo-Awash floodplain, at least for activities that leave an archaeological signature. When Stout and colleagues compared the river cobbles at archaeological sites to the assemblages from those sites, they found that early Oldowan tool makers preferentially used rocks with properties that made them ideal for flake production. Stout and colleagues used this fact to argue that the hominins at Oldowan were proficient in engaging with technological behavior and the properties in stone that would be necessary to create the desired outcome. Stout and colleagues further suggest that material selectivity was present even in some of the earliest examples of the Oldowan.

Gona assemblages have also featured in several debates regarding the underlying cause of variation in Oldowan assemblages.

==== Variation through time ====
===== Pre-Oldowan =====
The archaeological record from the first documented instances of the Oldowan at around 2.6 million years ago to approximately 2 million years ago (Ma) is very patchy. The lack of early Oldowan sites was especially true in the mid-1990s when Semaw first excavated at Gona. The patchy nature of the record during this period led some archaeologists in the 1990s and early 2000s to suggest distinguishing Oldowan artifacts from before 2.0 Ma and those after 2.0 Ma. These researchers broadly designated sites before 2.0 Ma as pre-Oldowan. The archaeologist Mzalendo Kibunjia was one proponent of this argument. Kibunjia formulated the Omo Industrial Complex to encompass the archaeological sites from this period. A primary feature of this complex is a lower degree of skill in knapping. Semaw disagreed with creating this distinction. When Semaw first described the East Gona (EG) 10 and EG-12 assemblages, he noted that none of the tools or their features fell outside the norm of other Oldowan assemblages from later. He argued that the hominins who made the tools at EG-10 and EG-12 were proficient in flake production and understood the basic principles of fracture mechanics based on the almost 3,000 artifacts collected from the sites. Semaw asserted that this indicated "technological stasis" in the Oldowan. In other words, the technological behavior remains similar, despite some variations. Although more recently, Semaw and his collaborators have moved away from this characterization of the Oldowan. As time has passed, the idea of the pre-Oldowan has mostly fallen out of favor.

===== Evolution of early lithic technology =====
The discovery of the Lomekwian and the Bokol Dora 1 assemblage from Ledi-Geraru has opened more questions and debates about the nature of variation in lithic technology during its first occurrences in the archaeological record. In his description of the Bokol Dora 1 (BD1) Oldowan assemblage, Braun suggests that the BD1 artifacts might be slightly less sophisticated than the oldest Gona assemblage. This statement indicates a trend of gradual variation through time. However, knowing if time is the source of the observed differences is challenging because of the multiple confounding factors that could be at work. The discovery of the Lomekwian, dating to 3.3 Ma, has further complicated the discussion and debate surrounding early examples of lithic technology. The significant time gap between the Lomekwi 3 assemblage and the emergence of the Oldowan has left some archaeologists skeptical. However, Flicker and Key have found that statistically, there is currently no support for the idea that the Lomekwian and Oldowan are the results of technological convergence. Flicker and Key's analysis suggests that Oldowan and the Lomekwian should be considered related unless further distinction can be made on the basis of technological attributes. The discourse surrounding these earliest examples of stone tool technology will continue to evolve as more information comes to light in the form of further discoveries.

==== Cumulative culture debate ====
The origin of human culture is an area of research in Paleolithic archaeology that holds a lot of importance for understanding human evolution and behavior. Human culture is cumulative. Cultural traditions pass through many generations, and innovation occurs over time. The development of cumulative culture was an essential component of hominin brain expansion. The brains of the hominins who used Oldowan stone tools were a lot smaller than the brains of modern humans. There is debate about the Oldowan Industry's place in human culture's evolution. This debate features some of Gona's Oldowan assemblages as evidence and pulls from research on primate social behavior.

Researchers who hold the view that the Oldowan is not cumulative culture view emphasize the continuity of Oldowan technological behavior across time. If the Oldowan were cumulative culture, one would expect to see some change over time. Therefore, there are better explanations for variation in Oldowan assemblages. They argue that because there is a lack of innovation, the type of social learning at work does not allow the transmission of novel solutions. Only behaviors that a hominin can independently invent are transmissible. They are transmissible because they exist within what Tennie and colleagues call "the zone of latent solutions." Tennie and his collaborators developed this concept after studying primate social behavior. Latent solutions are part of an individual's behavioral repertoire because they find their basis in interactions between biology and the environment. Given the right circumstances, any individual can reasonably re-invent these actions. Social learning mechanisms allow the hominins to transmit the behavior. Still, the behavior is not novel, so it does not require things that an individual doesn't know how to do independently. Variation is more likely the result of re-invention, not cumulative culture.

Other archaeologists believe that the Oldowan played a part in developing cumulative culture. Stout and his colleagues see cultural evolution as a slow and gradual process. They suggested the following scenario for how cumulative culture would have come about. In their view, knapping is difficult, even for modern humans. Knapping has a set of rules, but there is a lot of flexibility in how those are applied. It takes a long time to get good at knapping, it requires a lot of practice and usually some form of imitation or teaching in modern human contexts. For Oldowan toolmakers, who had limited cognitive ability and motor-perceptual skills compared to modern humans, getting good at knapping was likely close to or at their limit for engaging in this cognitively demanding task. But it was vital for them to get good at knapping because stone tools gave them access to resources they wouldn't have had access to otherwise. Because accessing those resources was essential, but tool-making was difficult, hominins probably supported each other in acquiring the skill. The social support needed to learn how to knap stone created an environment with selective pressure on cognitive, motor, and perceptual adaptions, making social learning easier. These adaptations would have also increased their capabilities. As their ability increased, they would have become more behaviorally flexible and more innovative. Eventually, this would lead to modern human culture.

Stout and his colleagues developed this possible scenario by looking at technological variation in Oldowan assemblages from different Gona sites and trying to determine what might have caused the differences. When they looked at the various assemblages, they saw that the only thing that changed from site to site was the reduction strategy. Each site used a specific pattern for most of the cores Stout and his team looked at. But there were a lot of questions about why that could be. It could be related to biology; maybe different species used different patterns. Or it could be environmental, where one way works better in specific environments. Through a series of statistical tests, they found that both strategies were equally challenging to maintain. Therefore, it was unlikely that cognitive differences between groups were the reason for seeing the different patterns. They also did some experiments where they made replicas of the assemblages to know if they had differential benefits. They found that they didn't. Stout and his colleagues argue that this proves Oldowan toolmakers copied specific methods from their group members.

=== Emergence of the Acheulean ===
The Gona project area's Acheulean sites have contributed to the discussion of the emergence of the Acheulean. Two sites, DAN5 and OGS-12, are dated to 1.6-1.5 Ma. They are only slightly younger than the earliest documented occurrences of the Acheulean at Konso, Ethiopia, and Kokiselei, Kenya, which date to ~1.75 Ma. Semaw and his collaborators note the similarities between the DAN5 Acheulean large cutting tools and those from Kokiselei and Konso. Although Semaw also notes differences between the assemblages from Konso and those from Gona. The primary difference he highlights is that the large cutting tools are made from river cobbles at Gona, while at Konso, tool-makers used large flake blanks. Semaw suggests that the difference in raw material resulted in other variations between the assemblages—notably in how the tool makers worked the artifacts. DAN5 Acheulean artifacts are bifacial, while those at the Konso site are predominately unifacial.

== See also ==
- List of fossil sites (with link directory)
- List of hominina (hominid) fossils (with images)
- Middle Awash
