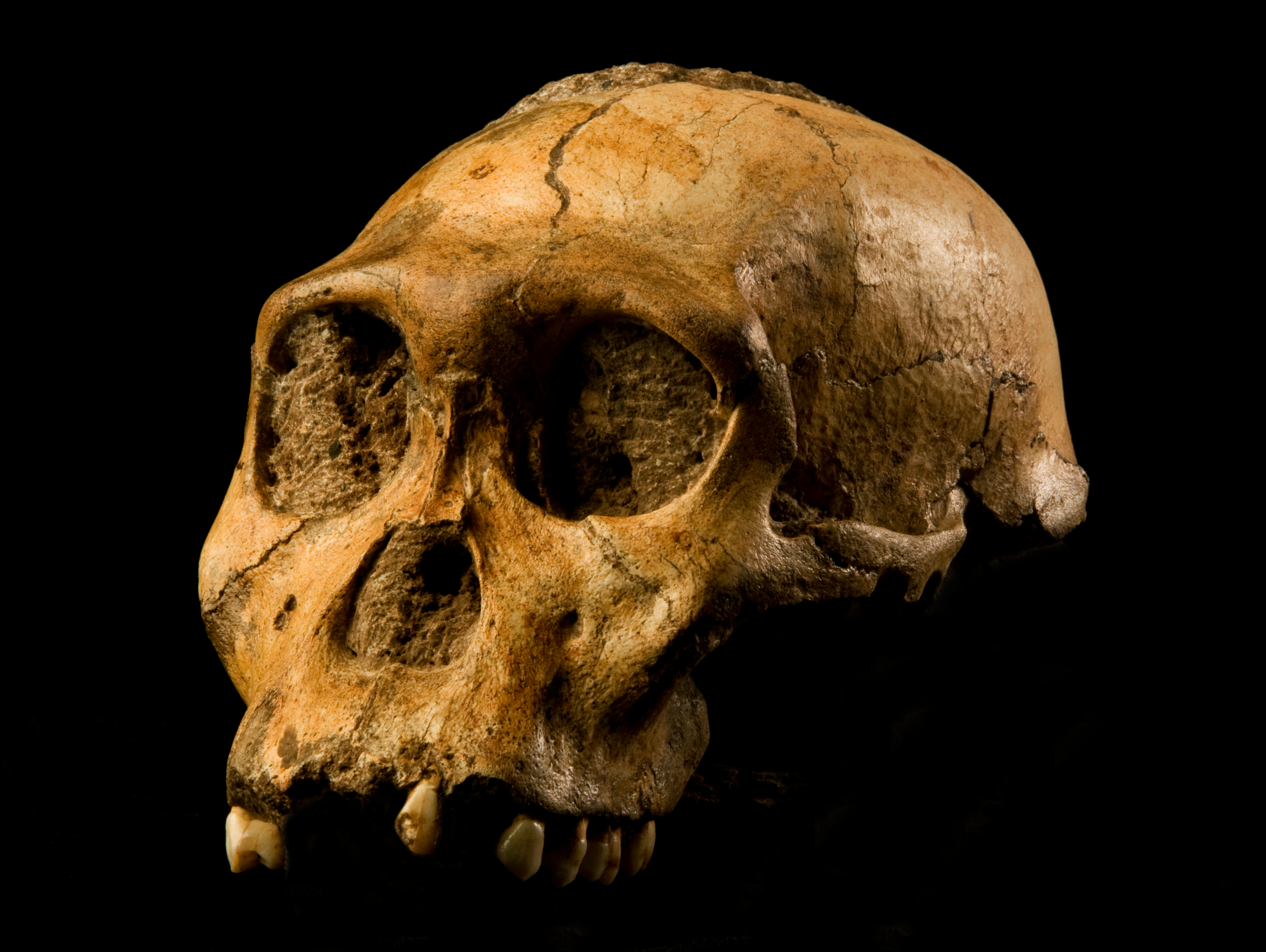
- Australopithecus sediba

Scientific classification
- Kingdom: Animalia
- Phylum: Chordata
- Class: Mammalia
- Order: Primates
- Superfamily: Hominoidea
- Family: Hominidae
- Tribe: Hominini
- Subtribe: Australopithecina; Gregory & Hellman, 1939

Type species
- †Australopithecus africanus Dart, 1925

Genera
- Australopithecus (cladistically including; Homo; Kenyanthropus; Paranthropus); Praeanthropus (sometimes used); Ardipithecus (debated); Orrorin (most likely); Sahelanthropus (possibly)

Synonyms
- Hominina Gray 1825 sensu Andrew & Harrison 2005

= Australopithecine =

Australopithecines Temporal range: Late Miocene–Present, 6.1 – 0 Mya (Range includes humans (Homo))

Extinct subtribe of the Hominini tribe

The australopithecines (/ɒˈstrəloʊˈpɪθəsiːnz, ˈɔːstreɪloʊ-/), formally Australopithecina or Hominina, are generally any species in the related genera of Australopithecus and Paranthropus. It may also include members of Kenyanthropus, Ardipithecus, and Praeanthropus. The term comes from a former classification as members of a distinct subfamily, the Australopithecinae. They are classified within the Australopithecina subtribe of the Hominini tribe. These related species are sometimes collectively termed australopithecines, or australopiths. They are the extinct, close relatives of modern humans and, together with the extant genus Homo, comprise the human clade. Members of the human clade, i.e. the Hominini after the split from the chimpanzees, are called Hominina (see Hominidae; terms "hominids" and hominins).

While none of the groups normally directly assigned to this group survived, the australopithecines do not appear to be extinct (in the sense of having no living descendants) as the genera Kenyanthropus, Paranthropus, and Homo probably emerged as sisters of a late Australopithecus species such as A. africanus and/or A. sediba.

The terms australopithecines, et al., come from a former classification as members of a distinct subfamily, the Australopithecinae. Members of Australopithecus are sometimes referred to as the "gracile australopithecines", while Paranthropus are called the "robust australopithecines".

The australopithecines occurred in the Late Miocene sub-epoch and were bipedal, and they were dentally similar to humans, but with a brain size not much larger than that of modern non-human apes, with lesser encephalization than in the genus Homo. Humans (genus Homo) may have descended from australopithecine ancestors and the genera Ardipithecus, Orrorin, Sahelanthropus, and Graecopithecus are the possible ancestors of the australopithecines.

Hominin timeline
← / Earlier apes; ← / Gorilla split; ← / Chimpanzee split; ← / Earliest bipedal; ← / Earliest sign of Ardipithecus; ← / Earliest sign of Australopithecus; ← / Earliest stone tools; ← / Earliest sign of Homo; ← / Dispersal beyond Africa; ← / Earliest fire / cooking; ← / Earliest rock art; ← / Earliest clothes; ← / Modern humans
(million years ago)

== Classification ==
Classification of subtribe Australopithecina according to Briggs & Crowther 2008, p. 124.

- Australopithecina
  - Australopithecus
    - Australopithecus africanus
    - Australopithecus deyiremeda
    - Australopithecus garhi
    - Australopithecus sediba
    - Australopithecus afarensis (=Praeanthropus afarensis)
    - Australopithecus anamensis (=Praeanthropus anamensis)
    - Australopithecus bahrelghazali (=Praeanthropus bahrelghazali)
  - Paranthropus
    - Paranthropus robustus
    - Paranthropus boisei
    - Paranthropus aethiopicus
  - Ardipithecus
    - Ardipithecus ramidus
    - Ardipithecus kadabba
  - Orrorin
    - Orrorin tugenensis
  - Sahelanthropus
    - Sahelanthropus tchadensis

=== Phylogeny ===
Phylogeny of Hominina/Australopithecina according to Dembo et al. (2016).

- Sahelanthropus tchadensis
- - Ardipithecus
  - - Australopithecus anamensis
    - - - Australopithecus afarensis
        - Australopithecus garhi
      - - Kenyanthropus platyops
        - - - Plesianthropus transvaalensis (Australopithecus africanus)
            - - Paranthropus aethiopicus
              - - Paranthropus robustus
                - Paranthropus boisei
          - Homo (including "Australopithecus" sediba)

== Physical characteristics ==
The post-cranial remains of australopithecines show they were adapted to bipedal locomotion, but did not walk identically to humans. They had a forearm to upper arm ratio similar to the Golden Ratio – greater than other hominins. They exhibited greater sexual dimorphism than members of Homo or Pan but less so than Gorilla or Pongo. It is thought that they averaged heights of 1.2–1.5 metres (3.9–4.9 ft) and weighed between 30 and 55 kilograms (66 and 121 lb). The brain size may have been 350 cc to 600 cc. The postcanines (the teeth behind the canines) were relatively large, and had more enamel compared to contemporary apes and humans, whereas the incisors and canines were relatively small, and there was little difference between the males' and females' canines compared to modern apes.

== Relation to Homo ==
Most scientists maintain that the genus Homo emerged in Africa within the australopithecines around two million years ago. However, there is no consensus on within which species:

Determining which species of australopithecine (if any) is ancestral to the genus Homo is a question that is a top priority for many paleoanthropologists, but one that will likely elude any conclusive answers for years to come. Nearly every possible species has been suggested as a likely candidate, but none are overwhelmingly convincing. Presently, it appears that A. garhi has the potential to occupy this coveted place in paleoanthropology, but the lack of fossil evidence is a serious problem. Another problem presents itself in the fact that it has been very difficult to assess which hominid [now "hominin"] represents the first member of the genus Homo. Without knowing this, it is not possible to determine which species of australopithecine may have been ancestral to Homo.

Marc Verhaegen has argued that an australopithecine species could have also been ancestral to the genus Pan (i.e. chimpanzees).

== Asian australopithecines ==
A minority view among palaeoanthropologists is that australopithecines moved outside Africa. One proponent of this theory is Jens Lorenz Franzen, formerly Head of Paleoanthropology at the Research Institute Senckenberg. Franzen argued that robust australopithecines had reached not only Indonesia, as Meganthropus, but also China:

In this way we arrive at the conclusion that the recognition of australopithecines in Asia would not confuse but could help to clarify the early evolution of hominids ["hominins"] on that continent. This concept would explain the scanty remains from Java and China as relic of an Asian offshoot of an early radiation of Australopithecus, which was followed much later by an [African] immigration of Homo erectus, and finally became extinct after a period of coexistence.

— Jens Lorenz Franzen, "Asian australopithecines?", Hominid Evolution: Past, Present, and Future (1985)

In 1957, an Early Pleistocene Chinese fossil tooth of unknown province was described as resembling P. robustus. Three fossilized molars from Jianshi, China (Longgudong Cave) were later identified as belonging to an Australopithecus species. However further examination questioned this interpretation; Zhang (1984) argued the Jianshi teeth and unidentified tooth belong to H. erectus. Liu et al. (2010) also dispute the Jianshi–australopithecine link and argue the Jianshi molars fall within the range of Homo erectus:

No marked difference in dental crown shape is shown between the Jianshi hominin and other Chinese Homo erectus, and there is also no evidence in support of the Jianshi hominin's closeness to Australopithecus.

However, Wolpoff (1999) notes that in China "persistent claims of australopithecine or australopithecine-like remains continue".
