= Gen Suwa =

- Born: 1954 (age 71–72)
- Education: UC Berkeley
- Awards: Asahi Prize
- Scientific career
- Fields: Paleoanthropology
- Workplaces: University of Tokyo

Gen Suwa (born 1954) is a Japanese paleoanthropologist. He is known for his contributions to the understanding of the evolution of early hominids, including the discovery of a tooth from a hominid that was more than one million years older than the oldest previously known hominid. The discovery changed scientific opinion regarding the ancestral splits between humans, chimps and gorillas.

A professor at The University Museum of the University of Tokyo, Suwa is a foreign associate of the National Academy of Sciences and a recipient of the Asahi Prize.

== Biography ==
Suwa completed an undergraduate degree in biology from the University of Tokyo, and he earned a master's degree in biological anthropology from the same institution in 1980. He earned a Ph.D. in anthropology at the University of California, Berkeley. He began to study hominid fossils in Ethiopia during his doctoral studies. He worked with Berkeley anthropology professor Tim D. White and has continued to collaborate with him after graduate school. Before joining the faculty at the University of Tokyo, Suwa worked at the Primate Research Institute at Kyoto University.

Since 1990, Suwa has done archaeological work at the Middle Awash site in Ethiopia's Afar Triangle. In 1992, Suwa found a tooth belonging to a primitive hominid. The hominid in question was at first thought to belong to the same species as the 3.2-million-year-old Lucy (Australopithecus). Within a year, sixteen more fossil specimens were found in the area, and in late 1994, a partial skeleton was located. Suwa used micro-computed tomography (micro-CT) and a 3-D stereolithic printer to reconstruct the skeleton. In 2009, the hominid was determined to belong to its own species (Ardipithecus ramidus) and to be more than a million years older than Lucy. The skeleton became known as Ardi. A special issue of the journal Science was published that year featuring 11 articles on various aspects of the research on Ardipithecus.

In 2007, Suwa was working in the Chorora Formation when he discovered several teeth belonging to an extinct ape. Suwa's group named the newly discovered species Chororapithecus abyssinicus. The characteristics of the teeth suggested that the species was an ancestral branch in the gorilla lineage. In 2016, Suwa and several associates - including archaeologist Yonas Beyene and paleontologist Berhane Asfaw, both from Ethiopia - determined that the teeth were about 8 million years old. The discovery indicated that modern apes originally came from Africa and not Asia. The age of the species showed that the human-chimp split and the gorilla-human split occurred several million years earlier than most scientists had thought.

Suwa won the Asahi Prize in 2009 for his work on the science behind early human evolution. The Japanese award is given to people who make outstanding contributions in academics or the arts. In 2016, Suwa was elected a foreign associate of the National Academy of Sciences. He is a full professor at The University Museum, The University of Tokyo. In 2019, Suwa became a laureate of the Asian Scientist 100 by the Asian Scientist.

== See also ==
- African archaeology
