= Yonas Beyene =

Ethiopian researcher

- Citizenship: Ethiopia
- Education: Wolkite University
- Occupation: Archeologist
- Awards: Fellow of the Ethiopian Academy of Sciences

Yonas Beyene is an Ethiopian archaeologist. He is known for his works on the Paleolithic archaeology of Konso and the Middle Awash, Ethiopia. Recently, he prepared the Nomination Files that eventually led to the registration of the Konso Cultural Landscape of southern Ethiopia in UNESCO's World Heritage List in 2011.

He graduated from Muséum National d'Histoire Naturelle, Paris, in 1991.

He is a Program Director in the Association for Research and Conservation of Culture and a research affiliate of the French Center for Ethiopian Studies, Addis Ababa.
