= Aramis, Ethiopia =

Archeological site in Afar Region, Ethiopia

Aramis is a village and archaeological site in north-eastern Ethiopia, where remains of Australopithecus and Ardipithecus (Ardipithecus ramidus) have been found. The village is located in Administrative Zone 5 of the Afar Region, which is part of the Afar Sultanate of Dawe, with a latitude and longitude of, and is part of the (Daale Faage Woreda), Carri Rasuk, Xaale Faagê Daqaara.

The Central Statistical Agency did not mention this village in their 2005 population report.

Archeologists include the find site near the village as part of the Middle Awash region. Taphonological and palynological studies have uncovered evidence of a rich fossil flora and fauna including many Canthium seeds, a genus found mainly in African woodlands and forests. Additionally, fossil medium-sized colobine monkeys and kudas suggest that pre-historic Aramis may have been wet, closed, and wooded, whereas today the Middle Awash is one of the dryest, hottest, and most uninhabitable regions of the world.

In 1992 and 1993 a team led by Tim D. White found in total 17 specimens of hominid fossils at Aramis. These fossils were dated at 4.4 million years, 500,000 years earlier than the oldest afarensis fossils found in the eastern Middle Awash. This discovery was published on the front page of New York Times, and later a new genus and species of hominids was proposed, Ardipithecus ramidus.

== Geography ==
The Middle awash study area covers 5,000 kilometers, with recent alluvium and/or volcanics covering more than 80% of that area. The current Awash River travels south to north across the study region, eventually emptying into Lake Abbé on the Ethiopia-Djibouti border. The Awash River is fed by perennial and seasonal tributaries that originate in the highlands along the western shoulder and ledge. The elevation of the Middle Awash study area varies from around 550 meters along the Awash River to around 850 meters near the western margin's foothills.

== Ecological and temporal placement of early Pliocene ==
The Middle Awash research region is located south of Hadar and crosses the present Awash River. The area's palaeoanthropological significance was identified by Taieb in the 1960s, after geological work began in 1938. Between 1975 and 1978 Rift Valley Research Mission in Ethiopia conducted additional research, followed by their team in 1981. Sedimentary layers in Ethiopia's Afar depression's Middle Awash research area have revealed vertebrate fossils, including the world's oldest hominids. The hominid-bearing layers are 4.4 million years old, according to radioisotopic dating, geochemical examination of interbedded volcanic ashes, and biochronological factors. Sedimentological, botanical, and faunal evidence point to the Aramis hominid inhabiting a forest environment. The first deposits discovered are found around the western edge of Afar. Bio chronologically, these are from the late Miocene. They haven't found any skeletons of hominids. The heaviest and most broadly exhibited Middle Awash layers are Pliocene deposits, which crop out east and west of the current river. After Gen Suwa identified hominid fossils in the Aramis headwaters on December 17, 1992, the inquiry focused on the area revealed between both the upper Adgantoli and lower Sagantole drainages. On the sides of the center complex, older sediments were gradually elevated above the Awash river bottom and are now uncovered. Between 3.5 and 4.5 Myr, the Rift Valley Research Missin in Ethiopia 'Aramis' and 'Haradaso' members were biochronologically identified. The species A. afarensis, which is presumed to be descended from the Aramis hominids, is thought to have exhibited a wide range of ecological tolerances, as evidenced by the fact that its bones have been discovered in rather open settings. It is probable that early Aramis hominids avoided these rather open areas, which would have predated A. afarensis's spread out of woodland habitats. This could explain why there are so few basals in l Pliocene hominid remains in non-woodland locations in the Middle Awash and elsewhere.

== Late Miocene Hominids ==
Late Miocene Homininds

New hominid remains from Ethiopia's Middle Awash region that age from 5.2 to 5.8 Myr and are linked to a forested paleoenvironment have been discovered. These Late Miocene fossils belong to the hominid genus Ardipithecus and are the first definitive proof of the clade's existence. All younger hominids share derived dental features solely. This suggests that the fossils belong to a hominid taxon that existed before the split in lineages that led to contemporary chimps and humans. Ardipithecus was phylogenetically near to the common ancestor of chimps and humans, based on the survival of primitive dental and postcranial features in these new fossils. Environmental signs point to a forested environment. Since the first (a partial mandible) was discovered in Alayla in 1997, 11 hominid specimens have been discovered at five different locations.

== See also ==
- Australopithecus afarensis
