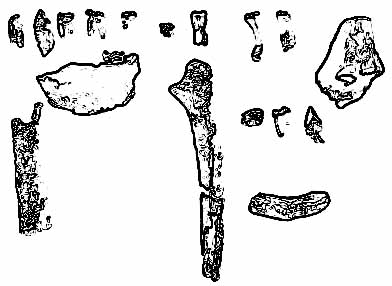

Scientific classification
- Kingdom: Animalia
- Phylum: Chordata
- Class: Mammalia
- Order: Primates
- Family: Hominidae
- Genus: †Ardipithecus
- Species: †A. kadabba

Binomial name
- †Ardipithecus kadabba Haile-Selassie, 2001

= Ardipithecus kadabba =

Ardipithecus kadabba Temporal range: Messinian, 5.77–5.54 Ma

Hominin fossil

Ardipithecus kadabba is the scientific classification given to fossil remains of a hominid "known only from teeth and bits and pieces of skeletal bones", originally estimated to be 5.8 to 5.2 million years old, and later revised to 5.77 to 5.54 million years old. According to the first description, these fossils are close to the common ancestor of chimpanzees and humans, which are estimated to have parted 5.5–6.3 million years ago. It has been described as a "probable chronospecies" (i.e. ancestor) of A. ramidus. Although originally considered a subspecies of A. ramidus, in 2004 anthropologists Yohannes Haile-Selassie, Gen Suwa, and Tim D. White published an article elevating A. kadabba to species level on the basis of newly discovered teeth from Ethiopia. These teeth show "primitive morphology and wear pattern" which demonstrate that A. kadabba is a distinct species from A. ramidus. Ardipithecus kadabba lived in a habitat that consisted of forests, wooded savannas, and open water areas, as had been described for Sahelanthropus.

The specific name comes from the Afar word for "basal family ancestor".

== Taxonomy ==
Fossil remains were first described in 2001 by Ethiopian paleoanthropologist Yohannes Haile-Selassie based on bones collected from five localities in the Middle Awash, Ethiopia. Haile-Selassie initially classified them as Ardipithecus ramidus kadabba, with kadabba deriving from the Afar language meaning "basal family ancestor". In 2004, he, along with Japanese paleoanthropologist Gen Suwa and American paleoanthropologist Tim D. White, elevated it to species level as A. kadabba based on apparently primitive features compared to A. ramidus. A. kadabba is considered to have been the direct ancestor of A. ramidus, making Ardipithecus a chronospecies.

Along with elevating it to species level, they suggested that Ardipithecus, Sahelanthropus, and Orrorin could potentially belong to the same genus. In 2008, American paleoanthropologists Bernard Wood and Nicholas Lonerga said that the larger ape-like canines of A. kadabba cast doubt on its assignment to the human line, but the position of Ardipithecus near humans has been reaffirmed by the discoverers and colleagues. They see a lineage of apes whose teeth continually reduce in size: A. kadabba–A. ramidus–Australopithecus anamensis–Au africanus, though they are unsure if Ardipithecus were the ancestors to these Australopithecus species, or were only closely related.

Evolutionary tree according to a 2019 study:

- Hominini
  - Chimpanzee
  - Sahelanthropus
    - - Ardipithecus
      - A. anamensis
        A. afarensis
    - - Paranthropus
        - P. aethiopicus
        - - P. boisei
          - P. robustus
      - - A. africanus
        - A. garhi
          - H. floresiensis
          - - A. sediba
            - - H. habilis
              - Other Homo

== Description ==
A. kadabba is known from nineteen specimens which reveal elements of the teeth, jaw, feet, and hands and arms. The holotype specimen, ALA-VP-2/10, is a right lower jaw fragment with a third molar, discovered in December 1997, and five associated left lower jaw teeth or root fragments collected in 1999.

This correction of the initial allocation of the fossil record was based on the argument that Ardipithecus kadabba had more "primitive" features than other Ardipithecus fossils. Ardipithecus kadabba thus also has a greater similarity with the genera Sahelanthropus and Orrorin. These statements were based on additional bone finds that came to light in November 2002 and were dated at 5.8 to 5.6 million years.

At the same time, evidence could be found of a reduced "honing" complex, traces on the teeth that arise when the canines rub against each other when biting, constantly sharpening their peaks, which has been found in all older finds. The loss of this feature in the successor species of Ardipithecus ramidus has been used for the allocation of discoveries in that line of development of great apes that led to the australopithecines and the genus Homo.
