= Middle Awash =

UNESCO World Heritage Site
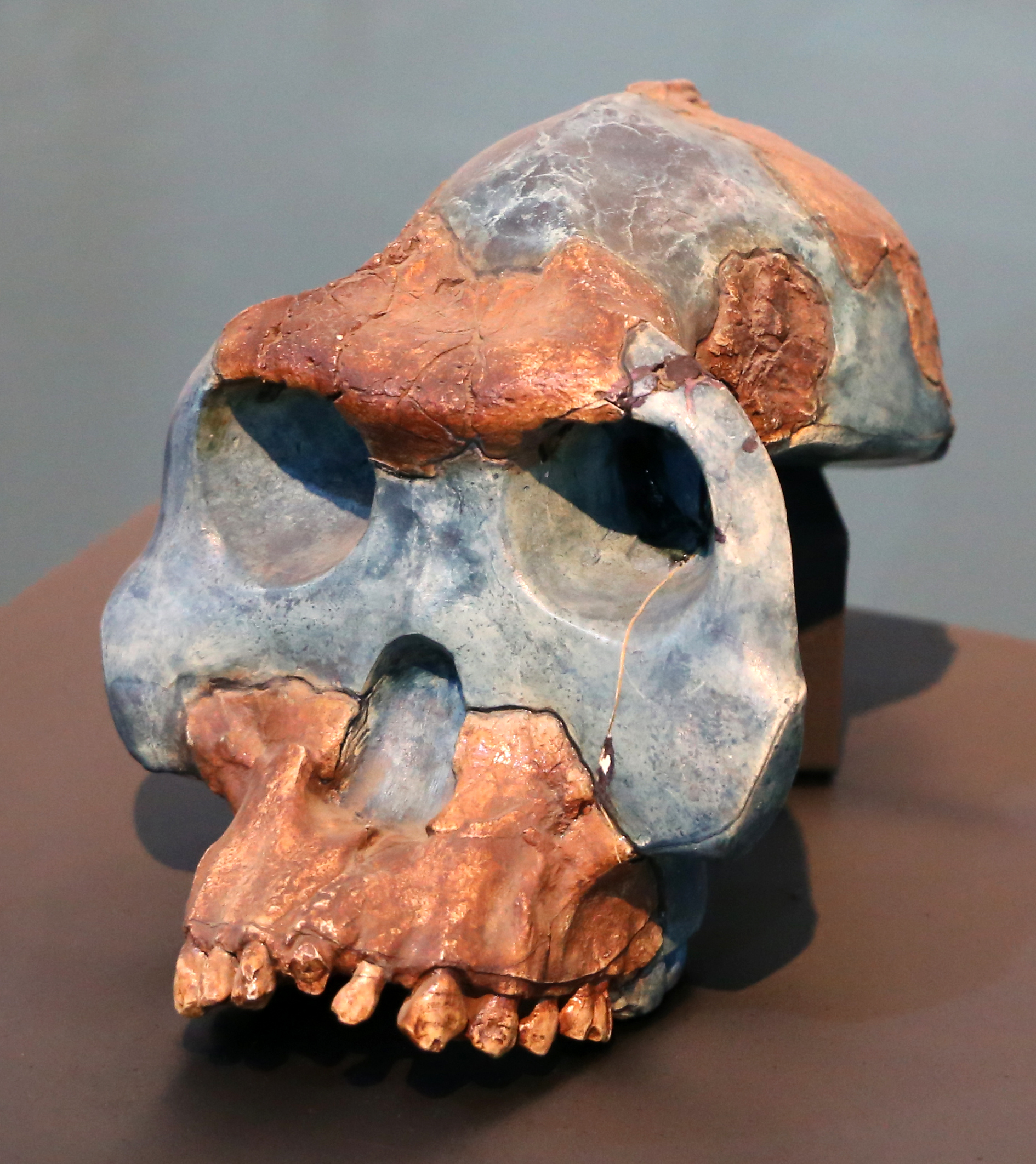
- Reconstruction of the skull of Australopithecus garhi, discovered at the site.

- Location within Ethiopia
- Location: Ethiopia
- Part of: Lower Valley of the Awash
- Criteria: Cultural: (ii)(iii)(iv)
- Reference: 10
- Inscription: 1980 (4th Session)
- Coordinates: 11°6′0.216″N 40°34′45.804″E

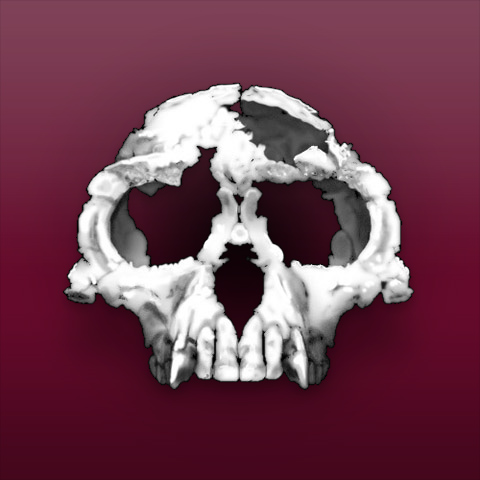
"Ardi", a 4.4 million year old fossilized hominin from Aramis, Ethiopia

The Middle Awash is a paleoanthropological research area in the northwest corner of Gabi Rasu in the Afar Region along the Awash River in Ethiopia's Afar Depression. It is a unique natural laboratory for the study of human origins and evolution and a number of fossils of the earliest hominins, particularly of the Australopithecines, as well as some of the oldest known Olduwan stone artifacts, have been found at the site—all of late Miocene, the Pliocene, and the very early Pleistocene times, that is, about 5.6 million years ago (mya) to 2.5 mya. It is broadly thought that the divergence of the lines of the earliest humans (hominins) and of chimpanzees (hominids) was completed near the beginning of that time range, or sometime between seven and five mya. However, the larger community of scientists provide several estimates for periods of divergence that imply a greater range for this event, see CHLCA: human-chimpanzee split.

A recent find of Australopithecus anamensis is dated to about 4.2 million years ago, which separates it only 200,000 years from an earlier fossil of the more primitive Ardipithecus ramidus (at 4.4 million years ago). Australopithecus garhi fossils are dated as recent as the very early Pleistocene, or 2.5 mya; fossils of Homo erectus in the Daka member at the site (at 1 mya) and Homo sapiens idaltu (at 160 ka ago) are found in the middle and late Pleistocene. And patches of fire-baked clay, disputed as evidences of the controlled use of fire, are also found in that later period.

Sediments at the site were originally deposited in lakes or rivers, and carbonates found there contain low carbon isotope ratios. This information suggests that the environment of the Middle Awash was wet during the late Miocene, and that this currently arid region was occupied then by woodland or grassy woodland habitats. Fossil remains of other vertebrates found with the hominins, including the cane rat, further suggest such an environment. The region was the site of periodic volcanism, which probably created distinct ecological regions inhabited by different species of vertebrate animals.

Important hominin fossils found in the Middle Awash include:

- Ardipithecus kadabba
- Ardipithecus ramidus
- Australopithecus afarensis
- Australopithecus garhi
- Australopithecus anamensis
- Homo erectus
- Homo sapiens idaltu found at Herto Bouri

== See also ==
- List of fossil sites (with link directory)
- List of hominina (hominid) fossils (with images)
