= Klasies River Caves =

Caves in Eastern Cape, South Africa

- Location within Eastern Cape
- Location: Tsitsikamma coast, Humansdorp district of Eastern Cape Province, South Africa
- Coordinates: 34°6′29.17″S 24°23′24.50″E

The Klasies River Caves are a series of caves located east of the Klasies River Mouth on the Tsitsikamma coast in the Humansdorp district of Eastern Cape Province, South Africa. The Klasies River Main (KRM) site consists of 3 main caves and 2 shelters located within a cliff on the southern coast of the Eastern Cape. The site provides evidence for developments in stone tool technology, evolution of modern human anatomy and behavior, and changes in paleoecology and climate in Southern Africa based on evidence from plant remains.

== Site exposition ==
Klasies River Cave is located on the border of the Tsitsikamma mountain range on the southeastern coast of Africa. The site sits within the Greater Cape Floristic region, characterized by the fynbos biome; however the Klasies River Cave environment is mixed woods and shrubby brushland and maintains a temperate climate. Klasies River main site is located on a sandstone cliff less than 1 kilometer from the Klasies River mouth and on the coast of the Indian Ocean. The district receives approximately 500–700 mm (20–28 in) of rainfall annually.

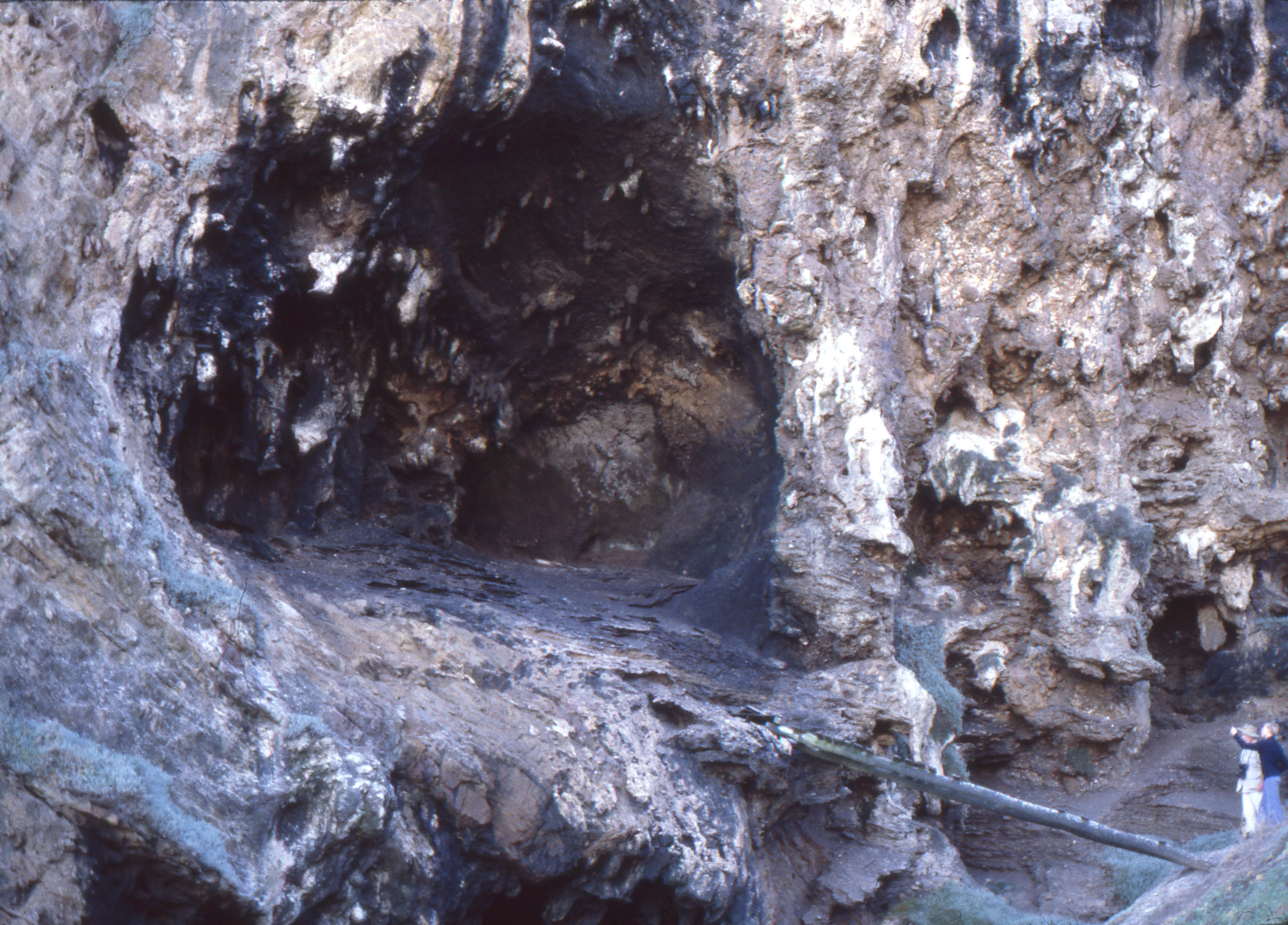
Klasies River Mouth Cave entrance

The site consists of Caves 1 and 2, and the protected overhangs of Cave 1A and 1B, together known as Klasies River main site. However, Cave 2 was not accessible until later stages after there had been significant deposition and build-up of sediments, and Cave 1B has been under-documented; most finds therefore come from Caves 1 and1A. These caves contain 21 meters of deposits that researchers have struggled to delineate stratigraphically. While sea levels fluctuated over time, during certain occupations, the proximity to the coast and the surrounding grasslands provided marine life and terrestrial animals that were exploited by the caves inhabitants.

== Excavations ==
From 1967–1968 John Wymer and Ronald Singer conducted excavations that revealed evidence of Middle Stone Age (MSA)-associated human habitation beginning approximately 125,000 years ago. Singer and Wymer excavated Caves 1, 1A and 1B, and part of Cave 2; using culture stratigraphy, they determined stages as MSA I, MSA II, Howiesons Poort, MSA III and MSA IV, which allowed comparison across the caves. Critiques of the original excavation include sampling bias due to excavation and screening methods, and combination of stratigraphic layers that obscures the sites' complexity; certain strata were lumped together making it difficult to differentiate between activities at the site and combining artifacts and bones from multiple different strata.

These initial findings prompted successive excavations to examine the varied and complex stratigraphy. Hilary Deacon began work in Caves 1, 1A and 1B from 1984–1995 focusing on the arbitrary delineation (the "Witness Baulk") that Singer and Wymer used to differentiate Cave 1A from Cave 1, as these caves are actually continuous. While the Singer and Wymer excavation used units that were excavated uniformly across the cave layer by layer, successive excavations focused on different stratigraphic approaches. Deacon's excavations maintained the microstratigraphy of the site. Deacon excavated units one by one, independently of other units in the cave, recording the stratigraphy observed in each individual unit before grouping units together based on their shared stratigraphic patterns. Rather than use culture stratigraphy, Deacon used a hybrid strategy combining Singer and Wymer's culture stratigraphy and lithostratigraphy. He developed a descriptive naming pattern for the observed soils instead of Singer and Wymer's classification system, however both systems are still used today.

Sarah Wurz began directing excavations at the site in 2013 and continues today with a continued focus on microstratigraphy; her work is mainly within the Cave 1 Witness Baulk, a section that hadn't been excavated previously. The current work is focused on gathering data from the microstratigraphy and refining the process of micro-scale excavations. This data allows comparison of KRM to other sites across the continent.

=== Stratigraphy and dating ===
The dates of the KRM stratigraphy have been obtained through isotopic analysis and dating of biological materials. Because the site exceeds 50,000 years old, radiocarbon dates are less useful due to carbon contamination. Researchers have resorted to analysis of unstable isotopes, such as Uranium-Thorium (U-Th) to provide more accurate date ranges. Marine isotope stages (MIS) are used to compare large-scale global temporal comparisons; each stage in the Klasies River Caves site correlates with a MIS stage.

The stratigraphy of the site consists of very fine, thin layers of sediment that have compressed under the successive layers on top of them. Researchers have used microstratigraphic techniques to analyze and interpret the complex timeline of sediment deposition and post-depositional activities within the caves. Because the cave system has so many varied layers and the different caves have different depositional characteristics and sediment properties, it has been hard to create a uniform system to group and chronologically group the layers for a site-wide comparison; natural processes such as erosion, and the influence of people at certain areas of the site (anthropogenic deposition of shell middens, hearths, etc.) have further complicated the interpretation of the stratigraphy. A lithostratigraphic and culture stratigraphic approach are both used at KRM today.

Singer and Wymer's stages at KRM began at the base, MSA I, followed by MSA II, Howiesons Poort, MSA III, and MSA IV. These groupings are based on changes on stratigraphy and/or changes in material culture though time. Deacon chose to organize the site based on soil descriptions; he categorizes the site on this basis with the lowest level being Basal Gravels, followed by the Light Brown Sand (LBS) Member, the Rubble Brown Sand (RBS) member, the Shell and Sand (SAS) member, the Rockfall (RF) and Upper member, and the White Sand (WS) member. Some of these layers are then further subdivided. This system allows researchers to compare deposition patterns and contexts across the site in each cave which may have different dates because of differing deposition processes in each cave environment; some caves may not contain each member listed.

Singer and Wymer's Culture-Stratigraphic Association	Deacon's Lithostratigraphy	Date ranges	Marine isotope stage	Dating method and location
MSA IV	White Sand (WS) Member	70 ka	MIS 4	optically stimulated luminescence dating (OSL) and infrared stimulated luminescence dating. Dating material from Cave 1 and dates earlier than in Cave 1A.
MSA III	Upper Member	60–43 ka	MIS 4 / MIS 3	linear uranium uptake model electron spin resonance (LU ESR) and TL dating. Dating material from Cave 1A.
Howiesons Poort	Upper Member	65–45 ka	MIS 4	LU ESR, U-Series, and OSL dating. Dating material from Cave 1A.
MSA II	Shell and Sand (SAS) Member	104–36 ka	MIS 5d-a	LU-ESR and U-Th shell dating in Cave 1. *in Cave 1A, the MSA II dates from 80-28 kya based on Uranium-Thorium and OSL dating within the same layer. This correlates with the Rockfall (RF) Member described by Deacon.
MSA I	Light Brown Sand (LBS) Member	110–90 ka	MIS 5d/e	Amino Acid Racemization (AAR), U-Th, and TL-OSL dating.

== Paleoenvironment ==
Paleoenvironment reconstruction uses multiple analytical foci to help determine a proximate estimate of the climate of a site during a given time frame. These reconstructions are aided through archaeological excavations and finds. Analysis of faunal remains can indicate what species existed across space and time. Likewise, archaeobotanical analysis provides insight into the plants that were in proximity to the site. These determinations are also aided by global climate estimates provided by deep sea cores. Plant and animal remains can also be indicative of certain climates as species have certain climatic ranges and preferred biomes. Changes in the location of the sea shore and in the grassy or wetland areas surrounding the cave have been determined using these methods.

MSA I fauna indicate a mosaic environment that included closed, drier areas with micromammals including moles, and open grasslands that favored grazing ungulates. This period is associated with an interglacial period (MIS 5e) and higher sea levels and warmer temperatures, which is supported by shell middens.

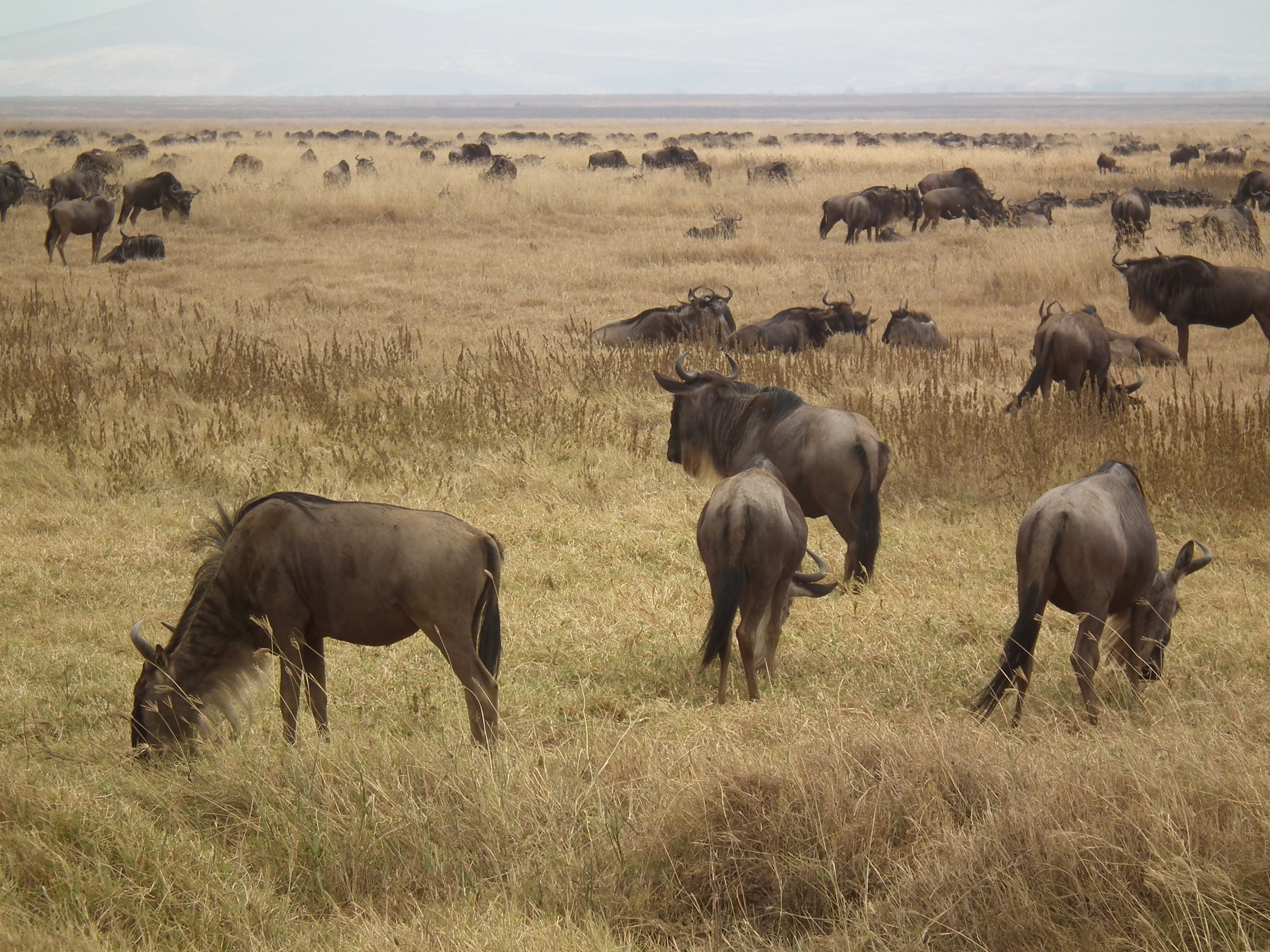
Wildebeest, members of the Alcelaphinae family, would have been available during some periods of occupation at Klasies River Caves.

MSA II shows a shift from MSA I. This period is associated with MIS 5d-a, with the early part of this phase associated with warmer temperatures shifting towards cooler temperatures later. During this time the coastline was likely never more than 10 km away from the site. The number of grazers decreased while mixed-feeders and browsers increased; this correlates with a decrease in shrubland and expanding grasslands. Terrestrial fauna include rock hyrax (rock rabbits), brown hyena, Cape dune mole rat, buffalo, equids, and members of the subfamily Alcelaphinae. There is also evidence of forest-dwelling bovid and other animals that prefer wetland grasses and reeds (African marsh rat and hippopotamus), indicating the environmental diversity of the site during MSA II. Warm-water shellfish (brown mussels and other rocky shore species) and cape fur seals were present at the cave as groups were able to exploit marine food sources as well.

The Howiesons Poort (HP) environment shifts from the closed environment of the later MSA II into a more open environment featuring more grazing animals. The earlier levels of HP contain more evidence of browsers which indicate a more closed environment while later periods increase in grazing fauna associated with more open environments. This period is associated with MIS 4, a glacial period with cooler temperatures and lower sea levels. Shellfish that appear in tide pools are more common in HP which suggests a further coastline. Data from Pinnacle Point show that the climate during HP was variable and unstable with periods of drought.

MSA III is marked by a declining temperatures and receding coastline that would have exposed the Palaeo-Agulhas Plain. The faunal remains are variable and consist of wetland species, open environment grassland grazers, and Cape dune mole rats that prefer sand dunes. This period corresponds to MIS 3, a cooler environment with short warm periods.

There is little data available to describe the paleoecology of the MSA IV. It does not contain many archaeological features such as hearths or material culture other than lithics.

Current ethnobotanical research exploring the biodiversity of Klasies River and the Cape region found that many hunter-gatherer-pastoralists from the Khoi and San populations use the flora and fauna of the region that was also found in archaeobotanical and faunal assemblages. The study took an inventory of plants within 5 km of the modern Klasies site and discovered 268 species. Over 50% of these plants were medicinal and 43% were edible or had other uses as demonstrated from interviews with Khoi and San communities. While not all of these plant species may have existed during the Middle Stone Age, these findings still demonstrate the longevity of plant knowledge throughout the communities in the area. The study also noted that the use of certain plant types for survival during climate changes, and proposed that humans in the past could have subsisted in similar ways.

== Findings ==
=== Material culture ===
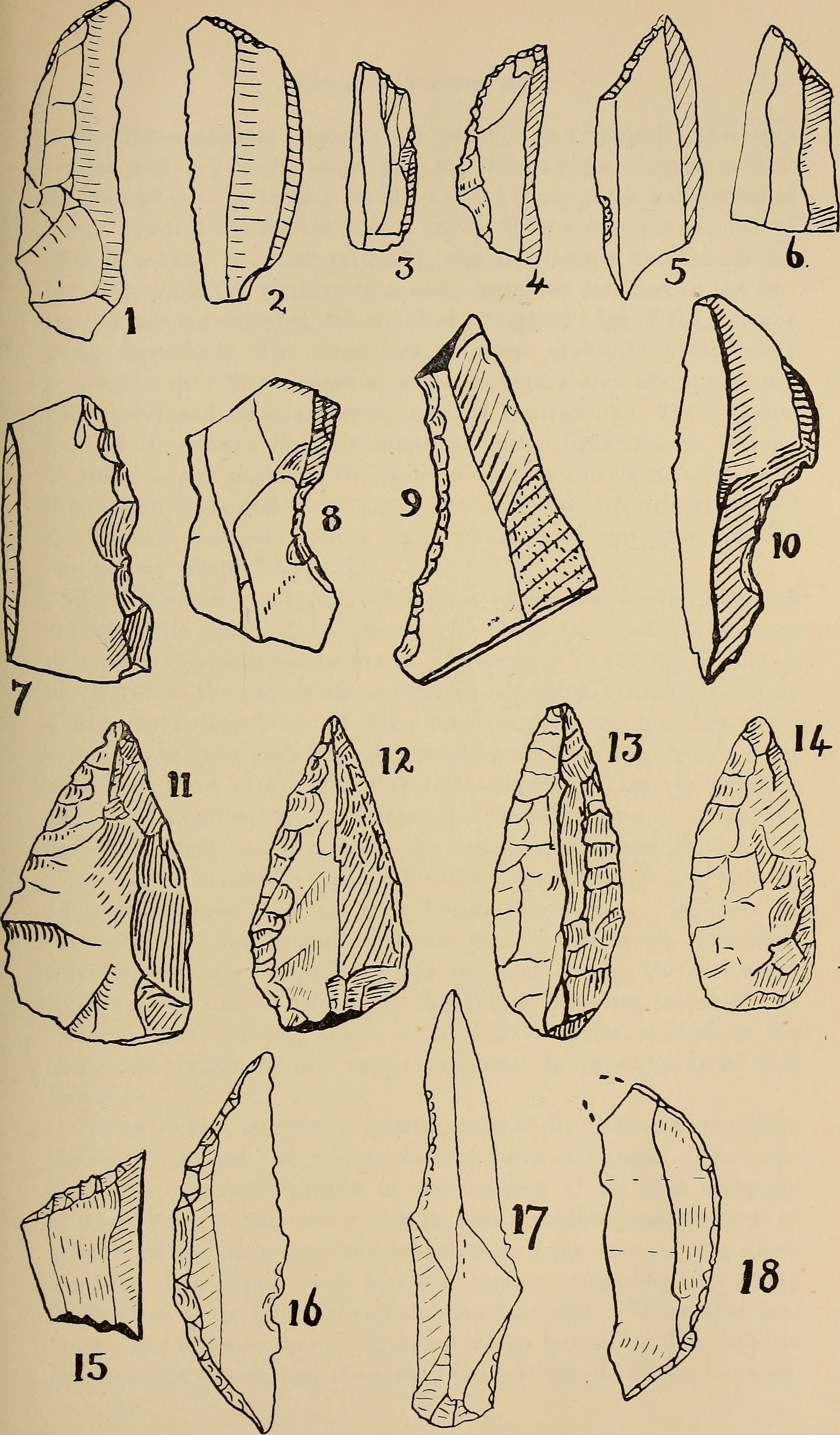
Examples of backed stone tools of the Howiesons Poort techno-complex.

There is evidence for stone tool production at the site. Rounded quartzite cobbles appear to be the preferred material for stone tool production based on the recovery of raw materials at the site. Analysis of flakes and debitage indicate that free hand stone percussion was the primary method of tool production at Cave 1, and the prevalence of consistent and nearly uniform points suggest that these tools were the desired end product. Lithic artifacts do show variation through the various occupation stages of KRM. Howiesons Poort interrupts the relative uniformity seen in MSA I and MSA II: in the latter, large and long quartzite points and blades were the goal end products and were usually not retouched, while the Howiesons Poort lithics were made from a wider variety of materials and were fashioned into smaller blades and artifacts. Tools from MSA III are made from more non-local raw materials than MSA I or II, but less than Howiesons Poort; these tools from MSA III also have a similar core morphology to Howiesons Poort. The MSA IV lithics consist of more flake blades than observed in MSA III.

Earlier layers from the site dating to MIS 5d-e have a density of shellfish and debitage from stone tool production. This dense accumulation of animal remains, shell middens, and the remains from stone tool production indicate that the caves were used as a home base rather than an intermittent shelter during this period. At later times in the younger strata of the site, a higher density of stone tools and lower density of shellfish at later dates suggest that the site was only used as a tool production site rather than a residential location. This change in mobility at KRM corresponds to a similar change during the same time period at Pinnacle Point.

Bone tools have been found at KRM during the original excavations by Singer and Wymer coming from MSA II and Howiesons Poort strata. Three denticulated bone tools originating from an MSA II context resemble musical rasps found at other Middle Stone Age sites in Southern Africa. The bone rasps were fashioned out of bovid rib and long bone, but a study found that the use wear did not relate to the same type of musical instrument used at the other MSA sites. Instead, the authors found starchy reside within the teeth of the rasp and suggest that the tool was used for plant processing rather than as an instrument or skin abrader, however this is not proven. A ground bone point dating to 80–65 ka and a charred bone with engraved lines come from Howiesons Poort contexts. Use-wear analysis found longitudinal striations consistent with longitudinal action (including arrow use); microstriations suggest that the bone point was also hafted within a reed, consistent with ethno-historic accounts of early hunter-gatherers from the region. Alternative interpretations that include use as a domestic tool for woodworking or as a javelin point are not consistent with microwear of the bone point leading the authors to conclude that the bone tool was used as an arrowhead. Other bone points have been found at MSA sites including Katanda in the Semliki River Valley, dating to around 90 ka, and at Blombos Cave dating to 73 ka.

Researchers have also confirmed evidence of shell beads at Klasies River caves, which is corroborated by similar discoveries from other cave sites on the southern coast.

=== Faunal remains and food sources ===
The hominins at KRM were hunter-gatherers, and the presence of faunal remains, shellfish, and plant residues shows the wide variety of food sources available near the site. Food consumption at the site consisted of marine and terrestrial animals, evidenced by shell middens and faunal remains of bovids. Scientists suggest that the wide availability and variation in food sources were the cause for the anatomically modern humans due to the nutrients required for larger brains and cognitive function. However other research on the relationship between brain size, longevity and social learning suggests that large brain size is not indicative of higher cognitive function or intelligence. Instead brain size may increase with social learning and increased perceptual and motor abilities. These increased abilities create a positive feedback loop that increases brain size via social learning and its impact on primate and hominin ability to acquire more nutrient rich food sources that favor brain growth. There is a clear relationship between brain size, sociality, and lifespan in primates, but how these influence each other is not yet certain.

Plants within a 12.5 kilometer foraging radius of the caves would have included 161 native species from a mix of geophytes / underground storage organs (USOs), leaves, and fruits, all of which would provide sufficient nutrients for the hominins at the site. By increasing the foraging radius to 35 kilometers away from the site, more nuts, seeds, and grains become available with a total of 281 available edible plant species; these resources were less abundant within the smaller radius and would give reason for an extended foraging journey to acquire varied and less perishable nutrients. A majority of the food plants within these radii can be eaten raw.

The association of animal and plant remains with hearths provides evidence that hominins at the site used fire to cook. Bones with cut marks and percussion marks from hammer stones indicate that meat and bone marrow were consumed. Cooked foods provide quickly digestible energy and would have contributed to a higher quality diet which could lead to an evolutionary change in Homo sapiens. Samples taken from hearths within MSA I and Howiesons Poort levels identified parenchyma, heated bones and shellfish found together indicating the cooking of multiple food sources. The parenchyma samples came from underground storage organs, but preservation did not allow for determination of plant species. The abundance of plant species available year-round, as discussed in previous sections, would have provided many reliable energy sources for humans; cooking these starchy plants increases energy absorption.

Site occupation patterns based on faunal, food source remains, and lithic evidence suggest that hominins were more mobile during the MSA I than in MSA II as indicated by use-wear analysis on stone tools and interpretation of shell middens.

== Human remains ==
During the first excavation in 1967 by Singer and Wymer, a coarse sieve was used for screening causing the loss of smaller bones, shells, and other artifacts; because of this sample sized are biased because long bones (i.e. bone shafts) and small bones (i.e. finger bones) were not collected. However, the bones that were analyzed show anatomical differentiation within Homo sapiens throughout time. Over 50 human remains have been found, a majority of them from Singer and Wymer's original excavation in 1967–68, and a majority of these excavated in Cave 1. The human remains come from early Homo sapiens and the fragments show sexually dimorphic traits. The Iziko Museums of South Africa have entered into correspondence with descendant communities in the Eastern Cape, exploring the possibility of the return and reburial of the fossilised human remains; a full negotiation is yet to be launched.

=== Inventory ===
The human remains from KRM are mostly fragmentary adult skeletal elements. No human remains were recovered from the WS member (MIS IV). Only one deciduous tooth is attributable to Howiesons Poort levels (Upper Member). The Upper member (MSA III) contains two parietal fragments, 1 deciduous tooth, and one permanent premolar. The majority of remains came from the SAS member (MSA II) and post-HP included two vertebral fragments, five mandibular fragments, seven teeth without associated alveolar bone, one facial bone, one pelvis fragment, one clavicle, 15 cranial fragments, one radius and one ulna fragment, one manual distal phalanx, and three metatarsals. The LBS Member (MSA I) contained 27 cranial fragments and two mandibular fragments.

A majority of the remains are cranial fragments, and these outnumber the post-cranial elements. This pattern has been argued to represent a pattern that is also observed in the faunal remains record. One argument proposes that the preferred elements are taken to the site and are preserved due to fragmentation from marrow collection e.g. the cranial bones are the preferred bones. Another argument suggests a collection bias in which post-cranial long bones were preferred and were not preserved because they were destroyed during marrow collection leaving only the cranial bones, hand and foot bones. However, it is likely an error in excavation and collection from Singer and Wymer that has biased against the collection of human remains.

An argument for cannibalism has been posed by some researchers. The fragmented human cranial fragments exhibit cut marks and charring similar to that of the faunal remains from the site. This treatment has led to the conclusion that the inhabitants participated in episodic cannibalism. Two individuals appear to be deposited around the same time in one stratigraphic layer, but correlating a site-wide cannibalism event requires a finer-scale understanding of the lithostratigraphy that is not possible at present.

Of the remains recovered, two mandibles display the idiopathic dental anomaly of hypercementosis; this condition has been discovered in Neanderthal and Homo erectus remains, but the individuals at Klasies remain the oldest case of hypercementosis in Sub-Saharan Africa (ca. 119 ka). This find is significant because it demonstrates continuity of the condition through the hominin lineage.

Finger bones (manual distal phalanges) dating to 90–100 ka were also recovered from the Witness Baulk in Cave 1. These bones are from an adult individual and appear smaller in size than modern human populations; they are also not comparable to Neanderthal phalanges. These phalanges are however similar to phalanges originating in Die Kelders cave which the authors suggest are more comparable to Holocene Khoesan populations. However, comparisons of prehistoric populations to modern populations are debated and may not have merit.

=== Anatomically modern humans ===
Assessment of relatedness between species is based on ancestral or derived traits to create a phylogeny that assigns closely related specimens to the same or similar groups; this is usually visualized as branches on a phylogenetic tree. Ancestral and derived traits vary with genetic drift, mutations, and other genetic factors that can steer evolution in many directions. Modern humans (Homo sapiens) originated in Africa and trace a lineage back to non-human primate ancestors there. For further discussion on human evolution, see human evolution, evolutionary genetics, and timeline of human evolution.

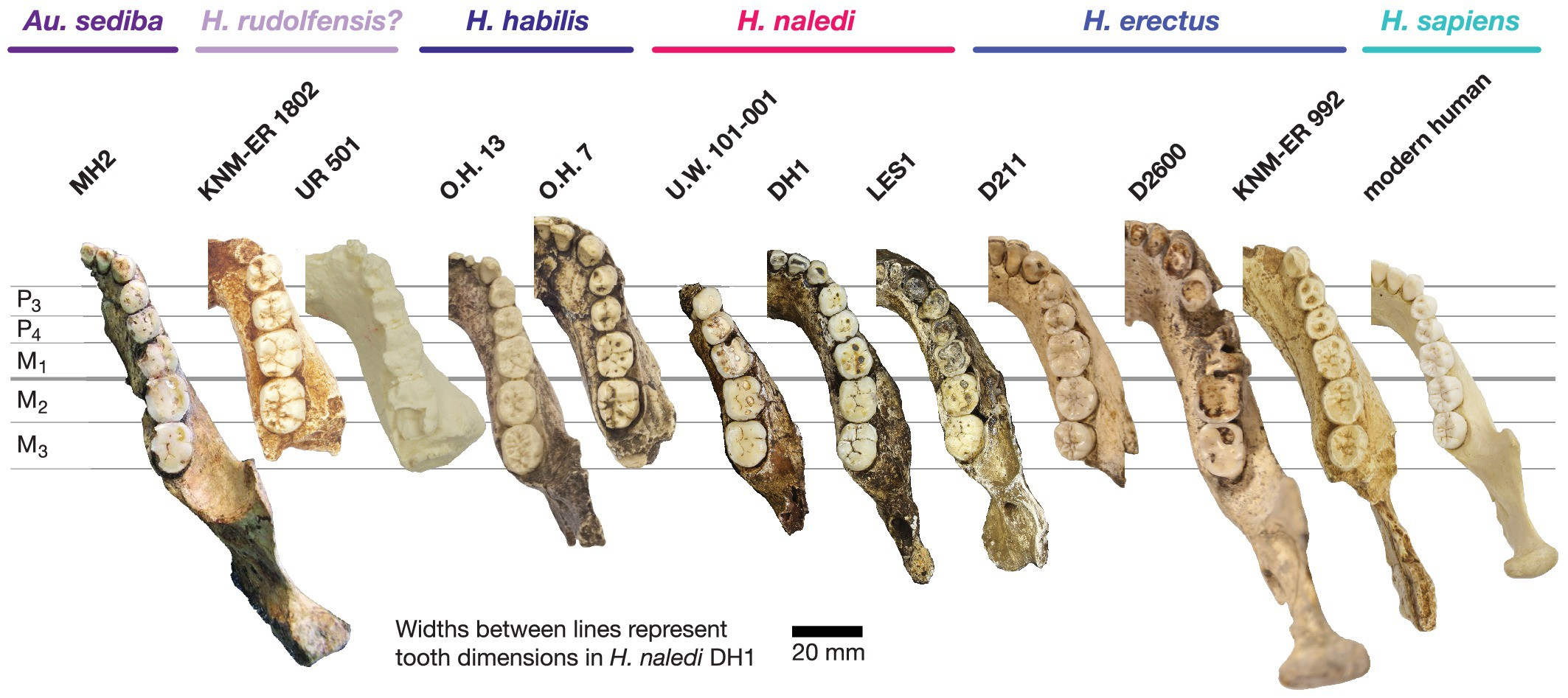
Evolution of the hominin mandible.

Anatomically modern humans share traits with today's modern Homo sapiens. Remains from the Klasies site appear to have modern human morphology based on cranial traits. The specimens do not have retromolar spaces in the mandible and the supraorbital regions appear similar to other Homo sapiens specimens. The differences in some of the skull fragments are attributed to sexual dimorphism—differences in the size or robustness of the bone between sexes. Other anatomically modern Homo sapiens specimens from the MSA are found at sites in East Africa and in the Levant (see Omo Kibish, Mumba Cave, and Shkul Cave). Researchers have turned to Africa as the birthplace of human behavioral modernity since it is also the place where modern humans evolved. Some researchers have proposed models and trait lists for behavioral modernity that has sparked intense debate among scholars about what constitutes modern human behavior. Evidence of woven grass beds at Border Cave, engraved ochre and beads at Blombos Cave, bone tool culture at Sibudu Cave, and incised ostrich eggshells from Diepkloof rock shelter have all been interpreted as complex behaviors. The debate about the origin of modern human behavior originally began as an assumption that modern anatomy and modern behavior came as a package during the Upper Paleolithic, but the previously discussed evidence situates the debate in the Middle Stone Age as an early adaptation that accrued slowly over time.

At Klasies River, the lithic techno-complexes are indicative of symbolic behavior as they change through the sequence from MSA I through MSA III. Each sequence displays a different social convention for construction of stone tools (a techno-complex) that isn't based on raw material availability. However, Howiesons Poort is the only recognized techno-complex at Klasies River Caves because it is recognized as a techno-complex across Southern Africa; further studies may recognize techno-complexes from other culture-stratigraphies as well. Conventionalized artifact manufacture that is passed through generations is argued as symbolic behavior by Sarah Wurz, the current primary investigator at the site. KRM's bone tools represent this symbolic behavior as they exhibit similar modifications and use-wear patterns that suggest they were used and created in the same way. Use of ochre is sometimes interpreted as symbolic behavior, however it also has practical purposes for paint or as an element of an adhesive. At KRM higher concentrations of red ochre are found in the MSA I and Howiesons Poort levels which may be evidence of ritual or symbolic use.

Despite the evidence above, modern human behavioral models are still a contested issue. Arguments for origins of behavioral modernity rely on findings of hominin remains at prehistoric sites; this allows material culture and inferred behaviors to be correlated with the discovered remains. However, taphonomic processes produce a bias towards sites where there is good preservation, skewing results and potentially obscuring the origin of behavioral modernity. Other studies that assert behavioral modernity rely on variables like climate, resource availability, and labor, which also influence behavior. Arguments that state brain size, social demographics and other factors are the cause of behavioral modernity are undermined by these outside variables. Complex behaviors include language and symbolic objects, which are not easily found in the archaeological record; however exchange networks, alliances, and egalitarianism are also indicators of complex behavior.

== Related sites ==
- Related Southern Africa Middle Stone Age sites: Border Cave, Blombas Cave, Sibudu Cave, Diepkloof Rock Shelter, Die Kelders, Boomplaas Cave
- Sites with fossil Homo sapiens: Jebel Irhoud, Omo Kibish, Herto remains

General:

- List of fossil sites (with link directory)
- List of hominin (hominid) fossils (with images)
- List of archaeological periods
- List of caves in South Africa
