= Ceprano Man =

Prehistoric human skull cap from Italy

Argil
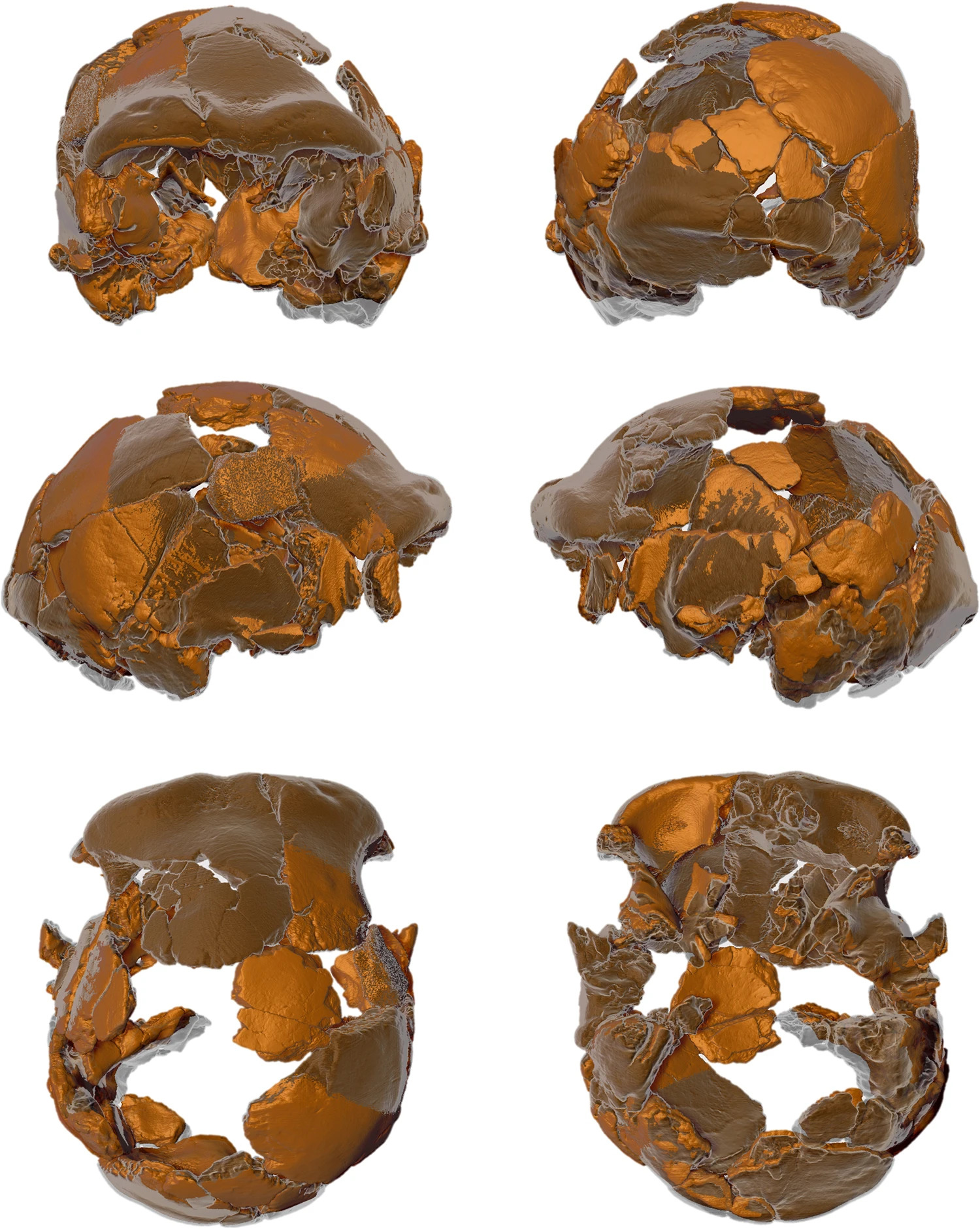
- Most recent reconstruction of Ceprano by Di Vincenzo et al. (2017).
- Catalog no.: No. 944/1
- Common name: Argil
- Species: Homo heidelbergensis Homo neanderthalensis
- Age: 430-385 ka
- Place discovered: near Ceprano, Frosinone, Italy
- Date discovered: March 13, 1994
- Discovered by: Construction crew

Ceprano Man, Argil, and Ceprano Calvarium, is a Middle Pleistocene archaic human fossil, a single skull cap (calvarium), accidentally unearthed in a highway construction project in 1994 near Ceprano in the Province of Frosinone, Italy. It was initially considered Homo cepranensis, Homo erectus, or possibly Homo antecessor; but in recent studies, most regard it either as a form of Homo heidelbergensis sharing affinities with African forms, or an early morph of Neanderthal.

== History ==
During excavation in preparation for a highway on March 13, 1994, in the Campo Grande area near Ceprano, Italy, a partial hominin calvaria was discovered. Although damaged by a bulldozer, it was recognized, documented, and described by archeologist Italo Biddittu, who happened to be present when the fossil was discovered. Mallegni et al. (2003) proposed the introduction of a new human species, dubbed Homo cepranensis, based on the fossil. As the specimen was believed to be around 700 ka, they believed that this specimen and Homo antecessor suggested a wave of dispersals into Europe 0.9-0.8 Ma through Iberia and the Middle East. The most recent belief is that it is associated with Homo heidelbergensis or rhodesiensis, or that it is ancestral to Neanderthals.

== Dating ==
The fossil was first estimated to be between 690,000 and 900,000 years old determined on the basis of regional correlations and a series of absolute dates. Taking the circumstances of the recovery of the fossil into account, Ascenzi (2001) noted that "an age between 800 and 900 ka is at present our best chronological estimate" based on "the absence in the sediments containing the cranium of any leucitic remnants of the more recent volcanic activity known in the region . . . and the presence above the cranium itself of a clear stratigraphic unconformity that marks" After clarification of its geostratigraphic, biostratigraphic and archaeological relation to the well known and nearby Acheulean site of Fontana Ranuccio, dated to 487±6 ka, Muttoni et al. (2009) suggested that Ceprano is most likely about 450,000 years old. Manzi et al. (2010) agree with this, citing an age of 430 and 385 ka.

Segre and Mallegni (2012) strongly retain their beliefs that the skull is 900-800 ka and is not the same age as the clay it was found in situ. Di Vincenzo et al. (2017) explain that this thought process is based on the belief of secondary deposition into younger strata, though they believe otherwise based on renewed analysis and context of the find. They note that a lack of gnawing, weathering or abrasions induced by transport supports the theory that the skull was buried once by rising and falling water levels, which is evidenced by the pedofeatures of the clay it was found in situ. This would have dispersed the remaining skeleton and rapidly filled the cranium for fossilization.

== Description ==
The reconstruction of the skull made in 2000 by Clarke and tweaked by M.A. de Lumley and Mallegni features repositioning of the parietal, removal of dental plaster, midsagittal plane was established, added two zygomatic frontal processus previously missing, added an occipital fragment, and rid of unnecessary plaster and glue reinforcements. DI Vincenzo et al. (2017) provided a virtual reconstruction wherein all plaster and glue was removed and the remains were repositioned to most closely fit their life position. They noticed misplacement and misalignment in the temporo-parietal region, left mastoid process, and occipital squama, and worked to correct some taphonomic distortion through retrodeformation and other methods. Most of this work is reflected in the vault rather than the face, and most of the peculiar aspects of the skull are now gone. For example, the single autapomorphy used to distinguish it as a new, valid species is a foreshortened vault, which when compared to the new reconstruction, appears typical of H. heidelbergensis.

=== Paleopathology ===
The specimen preserves several injuries, The first is a deep, wide recess infiltrating deep the left greater wing of the sphenotemporal suture on the sphenoidal sinus, which was found but not reported early in Ceprano's literature history. Second, a healed depression on the right brow. This was probably caused by an altercation with a large animal, where the skull was butted and fractured; this is more plausible than another, more popular explanation that the blow was inflicted by another human wielding a stick (thus being, hypothetically, murder). They hypothesized that the individual was a young adult man (gender stated without evidence) whose activities consisted of hunting for themself or the group, and was "bold and aggressive" based on the accumulation of injuries. The fracture healed, suggesting that it did not cause death and the congenital malformation on the skull was not restrictive or painful enough to limit the subject's physical abilities.

== Classification ==
Hominin timeline
| ← / Earlier apes; ← / Gorilla split; ← / Chimpanzee split; ← / Earliest bipedal; ← / Earliest sign of Ardipithecus; ← / Earliest sign of Australopithecus; ← / Earliest stone tools; ← / Earliest sign of Homo; ← / Dispersal beyond Africa; ← / Earliest fire / cooking; ← / Earliest rock art; ← / Earliest clothes; ← / Modern humans |
(million years ago)

Ascenzi et al. (1996) argue that the similarity to Chinese H. erectus and assignment to Homo heidelbergensis based on provenance (as Mauer cannot be compared to Ceprano) cannot justify attribution to any other species. Ascenzi and Segre (1997) compared an early cranial reconstruction with the Gran Dolina fossils and concluded that it was "late Homo erectus", being one of the latest occurrences of the species and earliest Italian hominin. This allocation was supported by them with vault profile data and metrics. However, Ascenzi and Segre also consider specimens such as Montmaurin, Arago, Petralona and Vertesszolos as H. erectus or a similar taxon. They suggested that Tighenif No. 3 mandible is a good fit for the skull, and hinted that connection between it and North Africa may be evident.

Clarke (2000) suggested that inconsistencies with minimal fontal breadth may be individual or geographic variation, and not taxonomically informative. Ascenzi et al. (2000) followed the cranial reconstruction by Clarke (2000) and modifications by M.A. de Lumley to reinforce assignment to H. erectus based on the tori, cranial capacity, bone thickness, and occipital profile angle.

Manzi et al. (2001) pose the possibility that it may be an adult Homo antecessor, but do not make the referral based on the reasoning that no elements from Gran Dolina match in age or completeness to directly compare with Ceprano. They also state that a less parsimonious explanation would be the accommodation of two contemporary species, as they find the specimen is not referrable to Homo erectus, H. ergaster, H. heidelbergensis, or H. rhodesiensis. In fact, they recommend creation of a new name to represent a transition from late African to early European fossils. They also suggest that Early Pleistocene dispersals toted a new morphology that was lost, possibly by other Acheulean-using hominins.

Mallegni et al. (2003) noticed a lack of Homo heidelbergensis frontal morphology was similar to the Daka specimen, and as such they were recovered as sister individuals in their cladistic analysis. They propose that the Bouri population was the source for later European populations, and the resulting species did not contribute to the genomes of later Middle Pleistocene (MP) hominins. They also suggested that similarity with Homo rhodesiensis fossils may be reflective of an ancestral-descendant phylogenetic relationship; and since the fossil was appearing so distinct they named Homo cepranensis with the calvarium as the holotype and only specimen.

Bruner et al. (2007) recognize that the characters of the specimen exhibits a mix of early African and later European features, enough to be potentially distinct or, alternatively, considered an ancestral of Homo heidelbergensis. However, they caution other workers that no direct comparisons can yet be made based on fossil record incompleteness. Mounier et al. (2011) have identified the fossil as "an appropriate ancestral stock of [H. heidelbergensis] . . . preceding the appearance of regional autapomorphic features." They suggested that the specimen could be "an appropriate 'counterpart'" to the current, inadequate holotype due to its preservation and morphology. They also suggest ancestry with Neanderthals.

Segre and Mallegni (2012) retain use of Homo cepranensis and dispute redating of the site. Freidline et al. (2012) follow suit with the opinion of Guipert (2005). Guipert (2005) digitally reconstructed several hominin fossils exhibiting extreme degrees of distortion, including the cranial remains from Arago. In their results, both teams draw similar conclusions that the Ceprano calvarium and the Arago hominins are closest in morphology.

Manzi (2016) suggested that the species Homo heidelbergensis is the best descriptor for the calvaria, and further proposed two modes of classification. One uses a single species under that name with Ceprano being having ancestral characters, but noticed that subspecific distinctions may be made. The second incorporates this, using the following: H. h. heidelbergensis (Ceprano, Mauer, Arago, ?Hexian, Melka Kunture 2–3), daliensis (Dali, Denisova, Jinniushan, Narmada), rhodesiensis (Broken Hill, Irhoud, Florisbad, Eliye Springs, Ngaloba, Omo Kibish II), and steinheimensis (Steinheim, Petralona, Reilingen, Swanscombe, Sima). Di Vincenzo et al. (2017) found with their new reconstruction that it is typical of H. heidelbergensis, specifically Broken Hill and Petralona. They suggest that it is ancestral to the neanderthalensis-sapiens-Denisovan clade.

Manzi (2021) elaborates that the specimen is a lost morphology that lived in a refugium in Italy (much like the Neanderthal from Altamura) and retained plesiomorphic traits for an extended duration. This suite of old traits gave rise to the MP hominin diversity observed, but was absorbed. Manzi, again, recommends H. h. heidelbergensis for the specimen. The description of the Harbin skull suggests that it is associated specifically with H. rhodesiensis. Roksandic et al. (2022) considered it for inclusion in their Homo bodoensis, but this term was agreed to be valueless and does not comply with ICZN naming conventions. They suggest that it may have contributed to Arago and Petralona, among other specimens.

== Technology ==
Lithics at Ceprano tend to be located higher up and in volcanic sediment. Choppers are more common than lithics at the Castro dei Volschi facie, and overlie the choppers found at Arce Fontana Liri. They are 458-385 ka (as low as 200 ka) in age, which was, at the time, much younger than the cranium. It is suggested that these populations dispersed during the late Early Pleistocene with Mode I technologies and their morphology was lost by other Acheulean-using hominins.

== Paleoecology ==
The Ceprano calvarium was discovered in the Camp Grande area by what is now a highway. It was associated with bone and lithic Acheulean artifacts and faunal remains, such as the straight-tusked elephant (Palaeoloxodon antiquus), the narrow-nosed rhinoceros (Stephanorhinus hemitoechus), Hippopotamus sp., the giant deer Praemegaceros verticornis, the fallow deer Dama clactoniana, beavers, aurochs (Bos primigenius), and the European pond turtle (Emys orbicularis). Pleistocene fossils occur in strata that is around 50 meters in thickness. The Ceprano basin splits into two sections: one of 22 meters in fluvial-colluvial facies with gravels and sands intercalacted with clays, and one of 24 meters with distinct limno-marsh facies, clays and silts. Further, six groups are split. The furthest to the top holds Acheulean and is common in aurochs and Palaeoloxodon. The skull was discovered in clays of a gray-green color above a travertine and with scattered nodular calcium carbonate concretions, mixed with yellow sands, and diffused with Ferromanganese. The area would have probably been forested due to the clay corresponding to a fluvial period that is in relation to terminal tectonics. It lived during the MIS 11, a warm stage at Lirino Lake, which was a refugium for archaic morphologies. It was buried once in a perilacustrine environment by rising and lowering water, scattering the skeleton and filling the cranium.

== See also ==
- Altamura Man (other Italian hominin in refugium)
- Archaic humans
- Homo heidelbergensis
- Middle Pleistocene
