= Archaic Homo sapiens =

The term archaic Homo sapiens has different meanings depending on the preferred system of taxonomy. See Human taxonomy for the question of taxonomic classification of early human varieties.

Archaic Homo sapiens may refer to:

- early forms of anatomically modern humans
- transitional forms of archaic humans possessing some of the derived traits of modern humans

== See also ==
- Human subspecies
- Homo sapiens
- Jebel Irhoud
- Florisbad Skull
- Neanderthal
- Denisovan
- Homo rhodesiensis
- Homo heidelbergensis
- Homo antecessor
- Homo ergaster
- Homo sapiens idaltu
- Omo remains
- Skhul and Qafzeh hominins
- Peștera cu Oase
- Red Deer Cave people
- Homo naledi
- European early modern humans
