= Tim D. White =

American paleoanthropologist

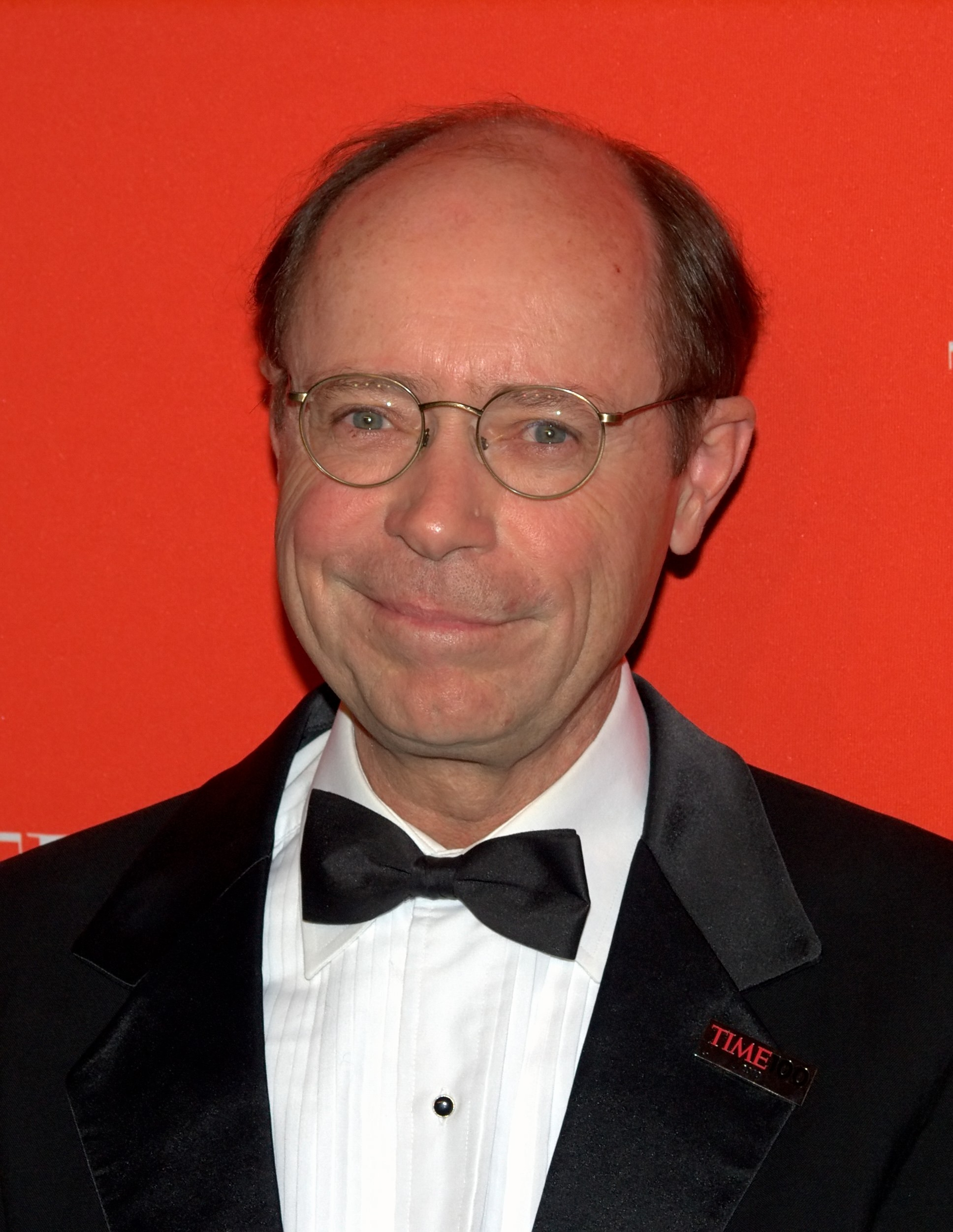
- White at the 2010 Time 100 Gala
- Born: Timothy Douglas White; August 24, 1950 (age 76); Los Angeles County, California, U.S.
- Education: University of California, Riverside (B.A.); University of Michigan (Ph.D.)
- Occupations: Professor of Integrative Biology at the Project; Curator of Biological Anthropology, Phoebe A. Hearst Museum of Anthropology; Advisor, National Center for Science Education
- Known for: Assisted in the excavation of the Laetoli footprints (1976); Co-author of the analysis of Lucy (1978); Discovery of Ardipithecus (1992); Discovery of Australopithecus garhi (1994); Discovery of Ardipithecus kadabba (2004)

Tim D. White (born August 24, 1950) is an American paleoanthropologist and Professor of Integrative Biology at the University of California, Berkeley. He is best known for leading the team which discovered Ardi, the type specimen of Ardipithecus ramidus, a 4.4 million-year-old likely human ancestor. Prior to that discovery, his early career was notable for his work on Lucy as Australopithecus afarensis with discoverer Donald Johanson.

== Career ==
Timothy Douglas White was born on August 24, 1950, in Los Angeles County, California and raised in Lake Arrowhead in neighboring San Bernardino County. He majored in biology and anthropology at the University of California, Riverside. He received his Ph.D. in physical anthropology from the University of Michigan. White took a position in the Department of Anthropology at the University of California, Berkeley in 1977, later moving to the university's Department of Integrative Biology. White taught courses on human paleontology and human osteology. He is a professor emeritus having retired in the spring of 2022.

He is director of the Human Evolution Research Center and co-director, with Berhane Asfaw, Yonas Beyene, and Giday WoldeGabriel, of the Middle Awash Research Project.

White has taught and mentored many paleoanthropologists who have subsequently gone on to prominence in the field, including Berhane Asfaw, William Henry Gilbert, Yohannes Haile-Selassie, and Gen Suwa and thousands of undergraduate and graduate students at the University of California, Berkeley.

Since 2013, White has been listed on the Advisory Council of the National Center for Science Education.

White has been accused of mistreating and misappropriating Indigenous people's remains. Some representatives of Indigenous Nations of California protest that he failed to comply with the Native American Graves Protection and Repatriation Act (NAGPRA), though no court has made such a finding. Laura Miranda, chair of the California Native American Heritage Commission, opined that his breach of NAGPRA's codes was "a major moral, ethical, and potentially legal violation." He has used human skeletal remains as teaching tools in classrooms within the legal framework in place at the time of his teaching activities, but has been accused of careless and negligent treatment of human remains.

== Collaborations ==
In 1974, White worked with Richard Leakey's team at Koobi Fora, Kenya. Leakey was so impressed with White's work that he recommended him to his mother, Mary Leakey, to help her with hominid fossils she had found at Laetoli, Tanzania.

White took a job at the University of California, Berkeley in 1977 and collaborated with J. Desmond Clark and F. Clark Howell. In 1994, White discovered 4.4 million-year-old Ardipithecus ramidus, a likely human ancestor from an era which was previously empty of fossil evidence. Near the Awash River in Ethiopia, he found an almost complete fossilized female skeleton, named "Ardi". He took nearly 15 years to prepare publication of the description.

In 1996, White, along with paleontologist Berhane Asfaw discovered fossils of a 2.5 million-year-old species BOU-VP-12/130 Australopithecus garhi, which is thought to predate H. habilis tool use and manufacturing by 100,000 to 600,000 years.

== Honors ==
- Fellow of the California Academy of Sciences
- Fellow of the American Association for the Advancement of Science
- David S. Ingalls Jr. Award from the Cleveland Museum of Natural History
- Member of the National Academy of Sciences
- Academy of Achievement Golden Plate Award (1995)
- Distinguished Alumnus of the Year (2000) at the University of California, Riverside

== Selected publications ==
- Haile-Selassie, Y.; Suwa, G.; White, T.D. (2004). "Late Miocene Teeth from Middle Awash, Ethiopia, and Early Hominid Dental Evolution". Science. 303 (5663): 1503–1505. Bibcode:2004Sci...303.1503H. doi:10.1126/science.1092978. PMID 15001775. S2CID 30387762.
- White, T.D.; Asfaw, B.; DeGusta, D.; Gilbert, H.; Richards, G.D.; Suwa, G.; Howell, F.C. (2003). "Pleistocene Homo sapiens from Middle Awash, Ethiopia". Nature. 423 (6941): 742–747. Bibcode:2003Natur.423..742W. doi:10.1038/nature01669. PMID 12802332. S2CID 4432091.
- White, T.D. (2003). "Early hominids—Diversity or distortion". Science. 299 (5615): 1994–1996. doi:10.1126/science.1078294. PMID 12663903. S2CID 83973951.
- Lovejoy, C.O.; Meindl, R.S.; Ohman, J.C.; Heiple, K.G.; White, T.D. (2002). "The Maka femur and its bearing on the antiquity of human walking: Applying contemporary concepts of morphogenesis to the human fossil record". American Journal of Physical Anthropology. 119 (2): 97–133. Bibcode:2002AJPA..119...97L. doi:10.1002/ajpa.10111. PMID 12237933.
- Asfaw, B.; Gilbert, W.H.; Beyene, Y.; Hart, W.K.; Renne, P.R.; WoldeGabriel, G.; Vrba, E.S.; White, T.D. (2002). "Remains of Homo erectus from Bouri, Middle Awash, Ethiopia". Nature. 416 (6878): 317–320. Bibcode:2002Natur.416..317A. doi:10.1038/416317a. PMID 11907576. S2CID 4432263.
- WoldeGabriel, G.; Haile-Selassie, Y.; Renne, P.R.; Hart, W.K.; Ambrose, S.H.; Asfaw, B.; Heiken, G.; White, T.D. (2001). "Geology and palaeontology of the Late Miocene Middle Awash valley, Afar rift, Ethiopia". Nature. 412 (6843): 175–178. Bibcode:2001Natur.412..175W. doi:10.1038/35084058. PMID 11449271. S2CID 7017992.
- White, T.D. (2000). "A view on the science: Physical anthropology at the millennium". American Journal of Physical Anthropology. 113 (3): 287–292. doi:10.1002/1096-8644(200011)113:3<287::AID-AJPA1>3.0.CO;2-8. PMID 11042532.
- Defleur, A.; White, T.D.; Valensi, P.; Slimak, L.; Crégut-Bonnoure, E (1999). "Neanderthal cannibalism at Moula-Guercy, Ardèche, France". Science. 286 (5437): 128–131. doi:10.1126/science.286.5437.128. PMID 10506562.
- Asfaw, B.; White, T.D.; Lovejoy, C.O.; Latimer, B.; Simpson, S.; Suwa, G. (1999). "Australopithecus garhi: A new species of early hominid from Ethiopia". Science. 284 (5414): 629–635. Bibcode:1999Sci...284..629A. doi:10.1126/science.284.5414.629. PMID 10213683.

== See also ==
- List of fossil sites (with link directory)
- List of hominina (hominid) fossils (with images)
