= Omo Kibish Formation =

Geological formation in the Low Omo Valley of southwestern Ethiopia

Coordinates: 4°48′1.27″N 35°58′1.45″E

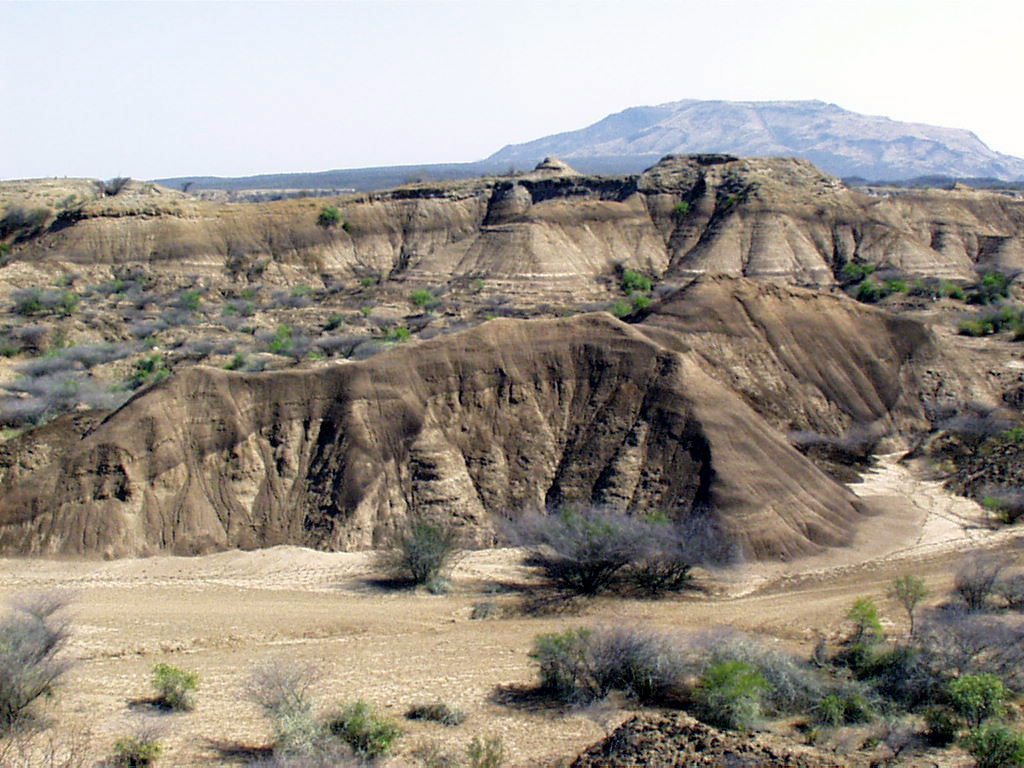
Omo Kibish Formation rocks near the town of Kibish, where the human fossils were discovered

The Omo Kibish Formation or simply Kibish Formation is a geological formation in the Lower Omo Valley of southwestern Ethiopia. It is named after the nearby Omo River and is subdivided into four members known as Members I-IV. The members are numbered in the order in which they were deposited and date between 196 ka ~ 13-4 ka. Omo Kibish and the neighboring formations (Shungura and Usno) have produced a rich paleoanthropological record with many hominin (e.g. Paranthropus boisei) and stone tool (e.g. Oldowan tools) finds. The Kibish formation, in particular, is most notable for Richard Leakey's work there in 1967 during which he and his team found one of the oldest remains of anatomically modern Homo sapiens. Known as Omo Kibish 1 (Omo I), the fossil was dated to 196 ± 5 ka old and is among two other Omo remains (Omo II and Omo III) that were found in Member I. The Omo fossils were more recently (in 2022) re-dated to approximately 233 ± 22 ka old. In the early 2000s a research boom enriched the knowledge base about the Kibish Formation. Study of the faunal remains (large mammal and fish faunas) and stone tools provided insight into the archeological associations of Homo sapiens and thereby their behaviors and the complex environmental contexts in which they lived and evolved.

== MSA lithic assemblage ==
During Richard Leakey's original 1967 excavations several stone tools were found in association with Omo 1 at Kamoya's hominid site (KHS) but were not well described in the research literature. In the 2000s further excavations occurred at KHS in addition to two other sites: Awoke's hominid site (AHS) also located in Member 1 and the Bird's Nest Site (BNS) located in Member 2. Summaries of the lithic assemblages found during the more recent excavations also consider the lithics found in the initial 1967 excavation.

The most common material used to produce the lithics found is chert. In general high quality fine-grained cryptocrystalline silicate raw materials such as jasper, chert, chalcedony comprise the clear majority (60-90% ) across all sites. Given that all but one rare occurring material could be found in contemporary gravel deposits in Member 1, it is predicted that early hominins obtained the necessary rock clasts to produce stone tools from local sources. Although all materials could be found in sufficient quantities in local gravel deposits, low quality materials such as shale, rhyolite and basalt were significantly more abundant. Moreover, high quality cores were more significantly reduced than were low quality cores. Together, these trends suggest that hominins were highly selective in their stone tool production. Sixty-nine percent of all cores are levallois cores or asymmetrical discoids which belong to the categorical class known as formal cores. Though the Kibish industry possess some characteristics that support the possibility of stone tool production aimed to accommodate high residential mobility, there are as well contradictory characteristics. For example, retouched tools are on the whole rare but the proportion of bifacially retouched tools is minuscule. In comparison to other MSA assemblages the cores were particularly small. However, it was hypothesized that this was a likely result of starting from smaller clasts. Despite such differences, paleoanthropologist John Shea concludes that the Kibish Industry seems to be a local variant of the larger east African industry yet to be named.

== Faunal remains ==
=== Large-mammal fauna ===
Research by Assefa et al. sampled all members but obtained faunal remains from only Members I, III, and IV. The faunal assemblages obtained from each member are similar in their diversity of mammals and are largely representative of the large mammals which comprise the current community of fauna in the area. That is, predominantly bovids, suids, and equids but also other ungulates such as hippopotamuses, rhinoceroses etc. The fossil fauna sample falls short in terms of its limited representation of primates (only a single specimen) and carnivores; some bovid species are not represented at all. Conversely, Hylochoerus meinertzhageni and Cephalophus are sampled in fossil fauna but are not in the extant community. The presence of H. meinertzhageni and Cephalophus is interesting because they are reportedly rare in the African fossil record having occurred in few sites such as the Matupi Cave. Another notable find within the fossil fauna is that of Equus burchellii and E. grevyi because this may suggests that the Omo Kibish area has for a long time been an exception to the otherwise rare coexistence of the two species in a given habitat. It is predicted that inadequate sample size rather than the existence of only current fauna during the late- middle Pleistocene may explain the absence of any extinct species within the Kibish Formation.

=== Fish fauna ===
==== Taxonomic composition ====
In total, 337 skeletal specimens of fish were collected from the Kibish formation members; as in the case of the mammals, fossils were found only in members I, III and IV. Although some of the 337 specimens likely belonged to the same individuals, it is believed that summaries of the taxonomic frequencies is not greatly impacted by this fact.

Together perciforms and siluriforms (catfish) comprise a staggering 86.7 percent of the Kibish assemblage. Importantly, the order perciform is represented entirely by a single species (Lates niloticus) while 76 percent of siluriforms are represented by Synodontis and clariids. Although the Kibish ichthyofauna does not closely approximate the documented biodiversity of the extant community (9 out of the 37 known genera were identified), overall it is similar to the modern fauna in the region. Member III contained all nine genera while Member I was missing Hydrocynus and Schilbe; nonetheless the two members were similar in the taxonomic frequencies (by order). Member IV contained only the three predominant genera ( Lates, Synodontis and Clarias).

==== Hominid interaction ====
Although there are no suggestive markings on the fossil material itself, other lines of evidence suggest that fishing was an established method of subsistence for hominids occupying the Omo Turkana Basin. The main evidence includes barbed bone points, similar to those in other MSA sites, found in Member IV. In said MSA sites in eastern and southern Africa, these bone points were found in association with processed fish material. Moreover, characteristics of some of the Kibish taxa, such as their large size or preference for open waters habitats suggest that they would indeed require tools to be procured.

== See also ==
- Omo remains
