= Herto Man =

Number of early modern human fossils found in Herto Bouri, Ethiopia

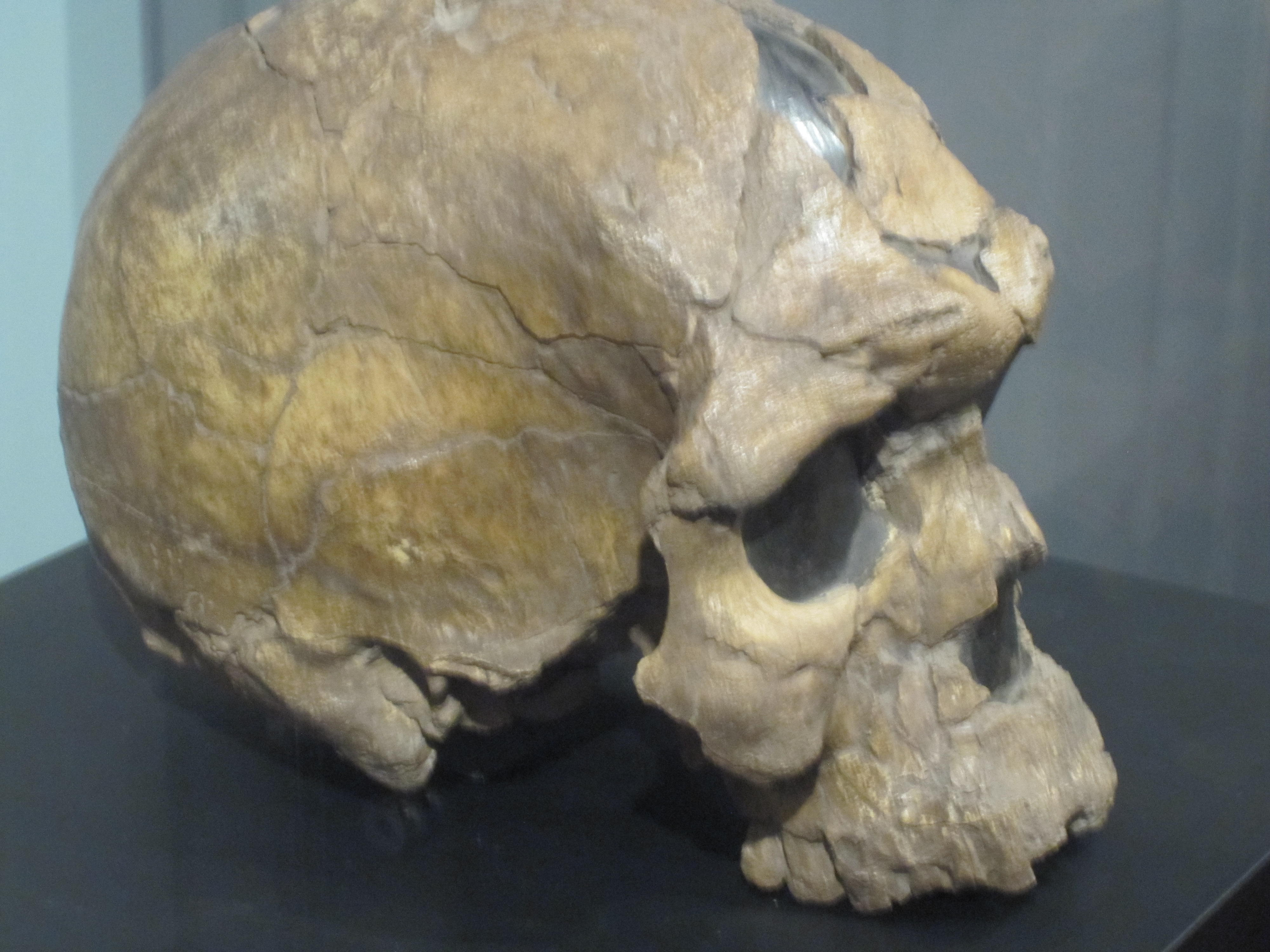
- Common name: Herto Man
- Species: Homo sapiens idaltu
- Age: 157±3 ka
- Place discovered: Bouri Formation, Ethiopia
- Date discovered: 1997
- Discovered by: Tim D. White and Berhane Asfaw

Herto Man is a set of human remains discovered in 1997 from the Upper Herto member of the Bouri Formation in the Afar Triangle, Ethiopia. The remains have been dated as between 154,000 and 160,000 years old. The discovery of Herto Man was especially significant at the time, falling within a long gap in the fossil record between 300,000 and 100,000 years ago and representing the oldest-dated Homo sapiens remains then described.

In the original description paper, these 12 (at minimum) individuals were described as falling just outside the umbrella of "anatomically modern human". Thus, Herto Man was classified into a new subspecies as "Homo sapiens idaltu" (Afar: Idaltu "elder"). It supposedly represented a transitional morph between the more archaic H. (s.?) rhodesiensis and H. s. sapiens (that is, a stage in a chronospecies). Subsequent researchers have rejected this classification. The validity of such subspecies is difficult to justify because of the vague definitions of "species" and "subspecies", especially when discussing a chronospecies, as the exact end-morphology and start-morphology of the ancestor and descendant species are inherently unresolvable.

Herto Man produced many stone tools which can fit into the vaguely defined "Transitional Acheulean", the long-lasting cultural tradition with both characteristically Acheulean (made by archaic humans) and Middle Stone Age (made by modern humans) tools. They seem to have been butchering mainly hippo, but also bovines, in a lakeside environment. The three most complete skulls (one a 6-to-7-year-old child) bear manmade cut marks and other alterations, which could be evidence of mortuary practices like excarnation.

== Research history ==
=== Discovery ===
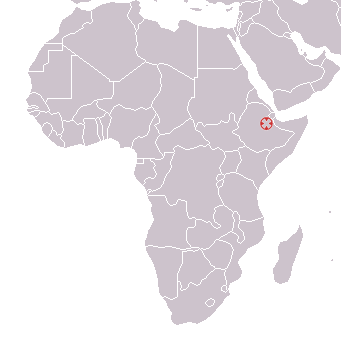
Location of discovery

Fossils of Herto Man were first recovered in 1997 from the Upper Herto Member of the Bouri Formation in the Middle Awash site of the Afar Triangle, Ethiopia. The materials are: BOU-VP-16/1, a nearly complete skull missing the left skullcap; BOU-VP-16/2, skull fragments; BOU-VP-16/3, a parietal bone fragment; BOU-VP-16/4, a parietal fragment; BOU-VP-16/5, a nearly complete skull of a 6- or 7-year old; BOU-VP-16/6, a right upper molar; BOU-VP-16/7, a parietal fragment; BOU-VP-16/18, parietal fragments; BOU-VP-16/42, an upper premolar; and BOU-VP-16/43, a parietal fragment. Further excavation has yielded a total of 12 individuals.

This region of the world is famous for yielding a series of ancient human and hominin species stretching as far back as 6 million years. In 2003, using argon–argon dating, the Upper Herto Member was dated to 160,000 to 154,000 years ago. The Herto Man was a major fossil find as, at the time, there was a significant gap in the human fossil record between 300,000 and 100,000 years ago, obfuscating the evolution of "Homo (sapiens?) rhodesiensis" into H. s. sapiens.

By the time Herto Man was discovered, based on genetic analyses and the fossil record after 120,000 years ago, it was largely agreed that modern humans H. s. sapiens evolved in Africa (recent African origin model), but it was debated if this was a continent-wide or localised process. In regard to the localised model, the antiquity of the Herto Man and the several similar specimens of presumably equal or even older age distributed across East Africa shifted the focus to that region. In 2017, the Jebel Irhoud remains were dated to 315,000 years ago, making them the oldest specimens classified as H. sapiens. Because this date overlaps with "H. rhodesiensis", the Irhoud remains also demonstrate that these transitional morphs, including Herto Man, represent a rapid evolution of the sapiens face, with gradual modifications to the braincase among populations distributed across Africa, beginning as early as 300,000 years ago.

=== "H. s. idaltu" ===
In a simultaneously published paper, anthropologists Tim D. White, Berhane Asfaw, David DeGusta, Henry Gilbert, Gary D. Richards, Gen Suwa and Francis Clark Howell described the material as just barely outside what is considered an "anatomically modern human" (AMH), beyond the range of variation for any present-day human. They instead considered the earliest "AMHs" specimens from Klasies River Caves, South Africa, or Qafzeh cave, Israel. They did this by comparing BOU-VP-16/1 with the Qafzeh 6 skull, the La Ferrassie 1 skull (a male Neanderthal, H. (s.?) neanderthalensis), the Kabwe 1 skull ("H. (s.?) rhodesiensis") and 28 present-day male skulls. Consequently, they classified Herto Man as a new palaeosubspecies of H. sapiens as "H. s. idaltu" (with the presumed male BOU-VP-16/1 as the holotype), which represents an intermediary morph between "H. (s.?) rhodesiensis" and present-day H. s. sapiens. The name comes from the local Afar language idàltu "elder". Similarly transitional specimens (at the time, not well dated) tentatively assigned to "late archaic H. sapiens" had been reported from Ngaloba, Tanzania; Omo, Ethiopia; Eliye Springs, Kenya; and Jebel Irhoud, Morocco.

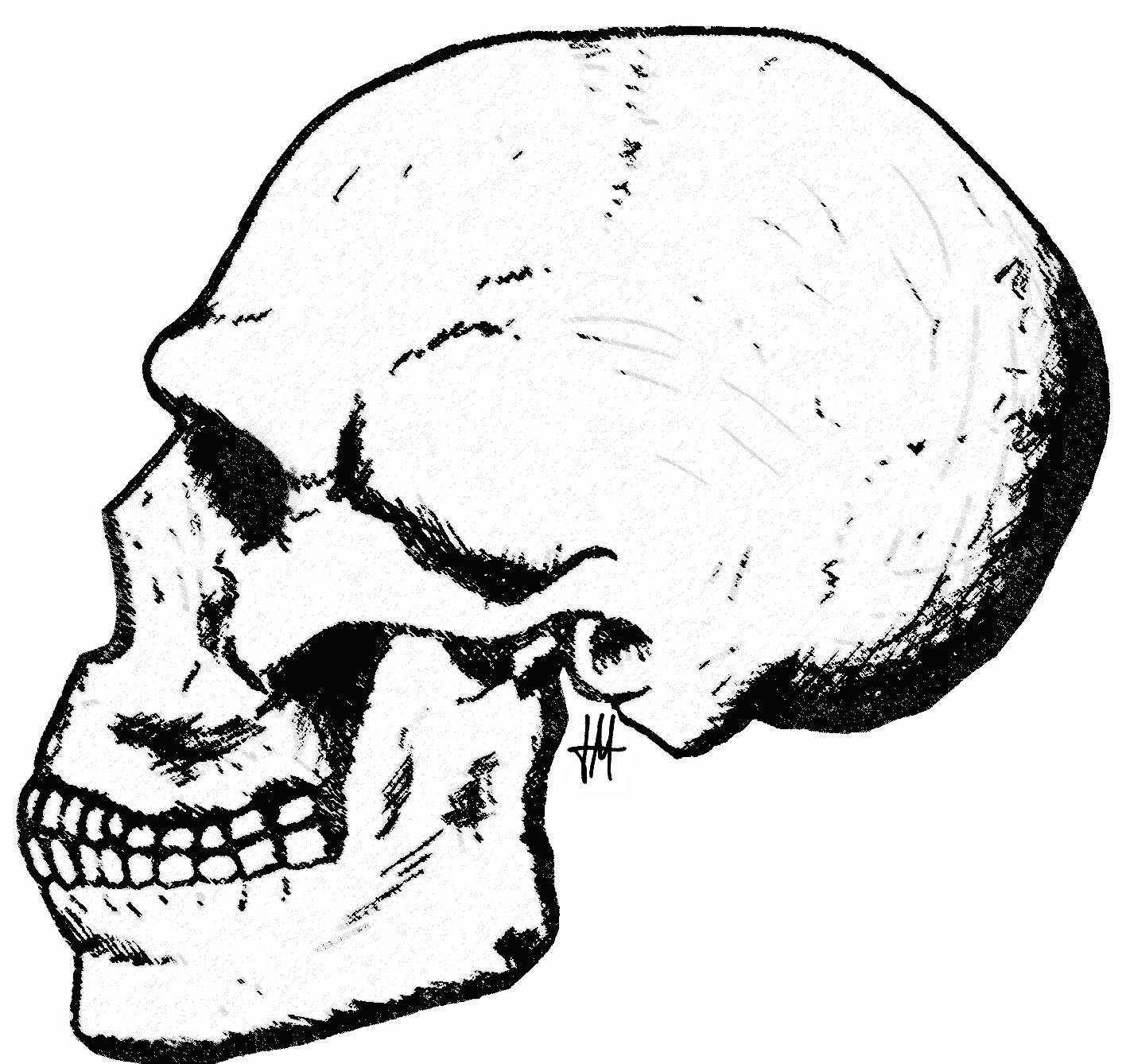
The H. s. sapiens specimen Skhul 5 (above) is anatomically similar to Herto Man.

In another simultaneously published paper, British physical anthropologist Chris Stringer doubted the validity of "H. s. idaltu", saying the material was similar to some Late Pleistocene Australasian specimens. White et al. made note of this, but still considered Herto Man "clearly distinct". In 2011, American anthropologists Kyle Lubsen and Robert Corruccini compared BOU-VP-16/1 with Skhul 5 from Es-Skhul Cave, Israel (temporally close to the Qafzeh material), and instead reported these two skulls are closely allied with each other. That is, their analysis found no support for Herto Man's position as a transitional morph, nor the nomen idaltu. In 2014, anthropologists Robert McCarthy and Lynn Lucas considered a much larger sample than White et al.—using several specimens representing "archaic Homo", Neanderthal, "early modern H. s. sapiens", and Late Pleistocene H. s. sapiens—and arrived at the same conclusion as Lubsen and Corruccini. Citing these two studies, in 2016, Stringer, in his review of literature regarding the derivation of H. s. sapiens, said the name idaltu, "does not seem justified."

The main issue of palaeosubspecies validity lies in the vague definitions of "species" and "subspecies", especially when discussing a chronospecies (an unbroken lineage which gradually changes, making the exact end-morphology and start-morphology of the ancestor and descendant species unresolvable). The original describers in 2019 still upheld the name "H. s. idaltu" because their argument, "depended largely on discrete traits," whereas McCarthy and Lucas "focused only on the gross cranial metrics", but also stated debating the exact taxonomic names and labels is overall not as important as understanding trends in human evolution.

== Anatomy ==
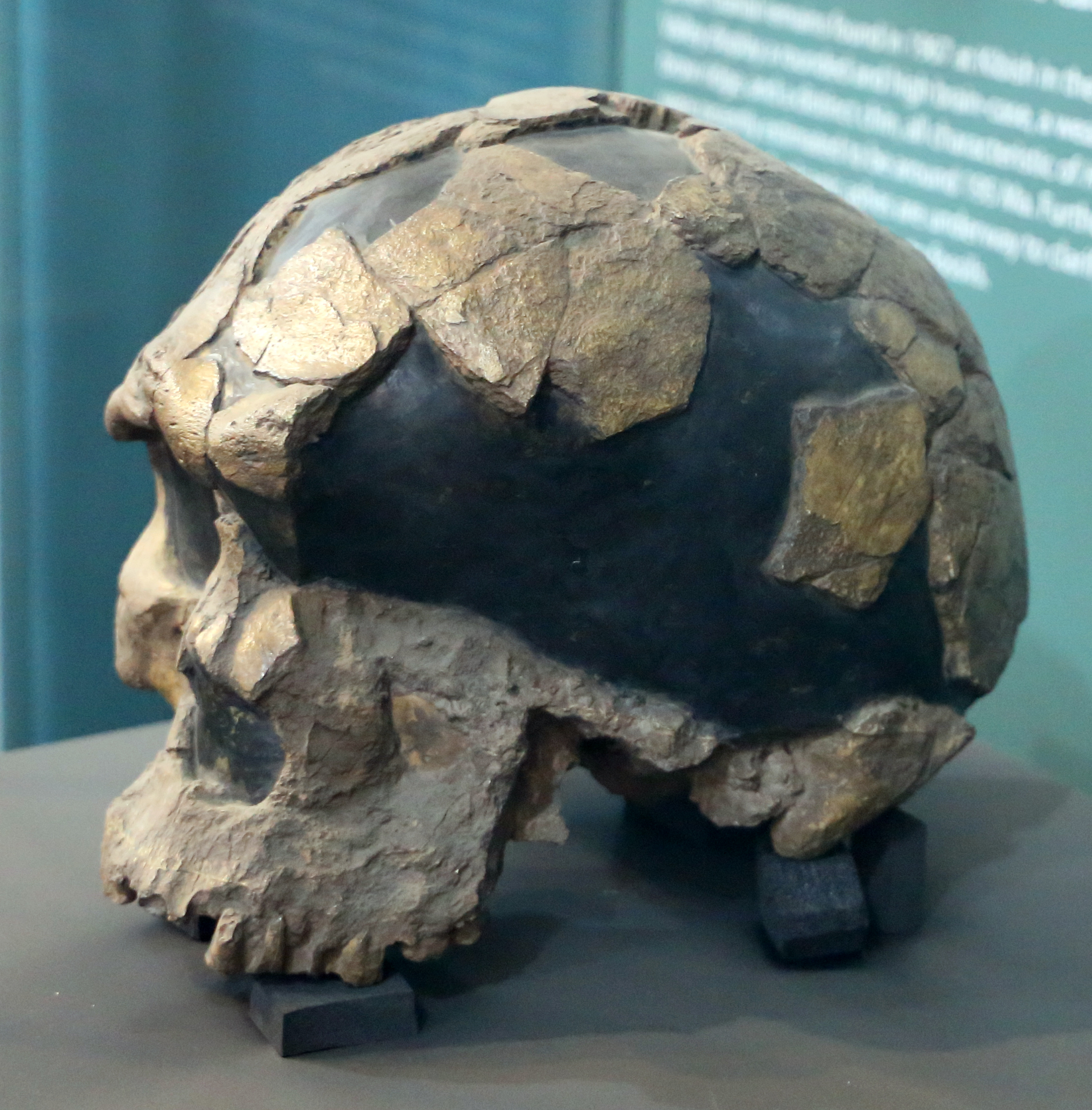
Cast of the left side of BOU-VP-16/1 at the National Museum of Ethiopia

Like what could be considered an "anatomically modern human", the Herto skull has a high cranial vault (a raised forehead), an overall globular shape in side-view, and a flat face. The brain volume was about 1,450 cc. The skull is quite robust in having a projecting brow ridge, weakly curved parietal bones, and a strongly flexed occipital at the back of the skull. These traits are well within the range of variation of modern humans. Compared to the average present-day human skull, the Herto skull is notably long and has overall large dimensions, although the cheekbones are relatively weak.

== Culture ==
=== Technology ===
The Upper Herto Member is a sandy fluvial (deposited by rivers) unit recording a freshwater lake environment, and has yielded archaeologically relevant remains across a 5 km (3.1 mi) stretch. Locality BOU-A19 preserved 71 artefacts, BOU-A26 331 artefacts, and BOU-A29 194 artefacts, a total of 640. Additionally, BOU-A19B has 29 artefacts, and BOU-A19H 15 artefacts. The tool assemblage contains tools made using the Levallois technique (associated with the African "Middle Stone Age"), as well as cleavers and other bifaces (associated with the earlier Acheulean). Though bifaces and blades are rare (respectively less than 5% and 1% of the tools), it is more likely these tools were frequently made by Herto Man at a different location than that they were indeed rarely produced at all. Such an assemblage is typically labelled as the vaguely defined "Transitional Acheulean", which is found as far back as 280,000 years ago. The Herto site thus indicates the transitional phase was long-lived, and the actual derivation of what is considered "Middle Stone Age" proper was not gradual nor simple.

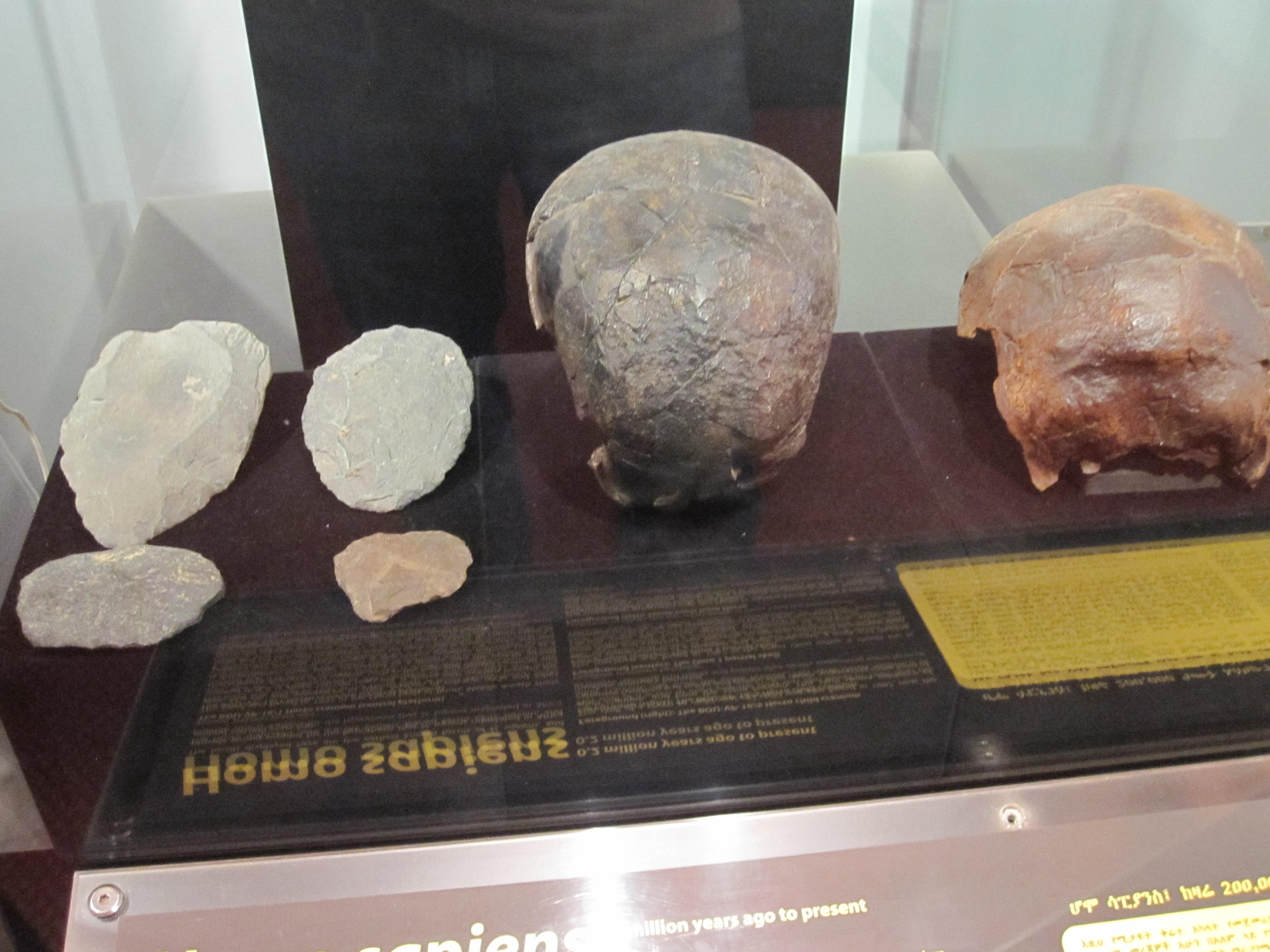
Stone tools from Herto (left), the Omo 2 skull (middle) and the juvenile BOU-VP-16/5 skull (right) at the National Museum of Ethiopia

Points and blades were made with obsidian, and other tools with fine-grained basalt, though a few scrapers were made with cryptocrystalline rock. Of the pool of 640, 48 flakes, blades and points were made with the Levallois technique. The 28 bifaces include ovates, elongate ovates, triangulars, cleavers, and a pick, scraper and biface core. All 17 handaxes were made with flakes and finished with soft hammering. Out of the 25 side scrapers, 22 were simple (only one side could scrape). There were 15 end-scrapers (only one or both of the ends could scrape), and a few were rounded off, somewhat resembling Aurignacian (40,000 years ago) end-scrapers.

Both the Lower and Upper Herto Members preserve several bovine and hippo carcasses with manmade cut marks, recording a long-lasting butchering tradition with a predilection for hippo. One location records the accumulation of numerous hippo calves (newborn to a few weeks old) and adults.

=== Mortuary practices ===
The adult BOU-VP-16/1 shows a weak, thin 35 mm (1.4 in) vertical cut on the bottom corner of his right parietal bone, and another smaller vertical line across the right temporal line. The adult BOU-VP-16/2 bears intense modification of 15 of his 24 associated skullcap fragments, as well as deep cut marks consistent with defleshing on his parietals, left cheekbone, frontal bone and occipital bone. BOU-VP-16/2 also presents evidence of repetitive scraping around the circumference of the braincase (generally interpreted as a symbolic modification rather than for consumption), and the lack of fragments from the base of the skull may mean the specimen was deposited as an isolated skullcap to begin with. The juvenile BOU-VP-16/5 has deep cut marks consistent with defleshing all along the undersides of the sphenoid and temporal bones, likely after the jawbone was removed. The occipital bone and foramen magnum (the base of the skull) were broken into, and the edges were polished and smoothed off, which is similar to the mortuary practices of some Papuan tribes. These could indicate that Herto Man was symbolically preparing the dead in some mortuary ritual.

== See also ==
- Blombos Cave
- Florisbad Skull
- Mumba Cave
- Omo remains
- List of fossil sites
- List of human evolution fossils
