= Berhane Asfaw =

Ethiopian paleontologist (born 1954)

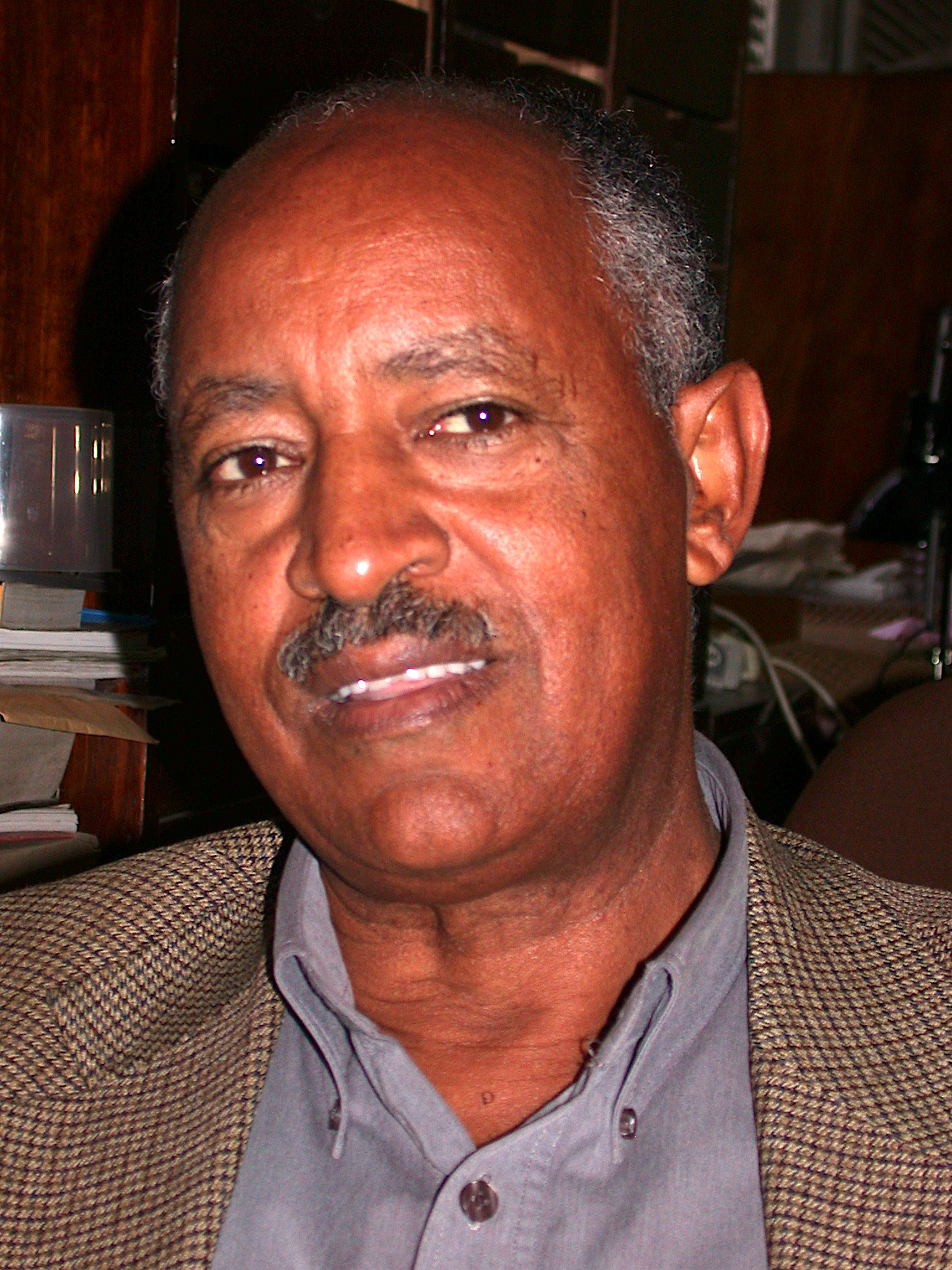
- Born: 22 August 1954 (age 72); Gondar, Begemder Province, Ethiopian Empire (now Amhara Region, Ethiopia)
- Education: Addis Ababa University University of California Berkeley
- Occupations: Archaeologist and Paleontologist
- Years active: 1981–present

Berhane Asfaw (Amharic: ብርሃነ አስፋው; Born 22 August 1954) is an Ethiopian paleontologist of Rift Valley Research Service, who co-discovered human skeletal remains at Herto Bouri, Ethiopia later classified as Homo sapiens idaltu, proposed as an early subspecies of anatomically modern humans.

== Research ==
Asfaw's father was the Secretary General of Gondar. He has five brothers and eight sisters. Asfaw was raised in the Kebele Hulet neighborhood in Gondar. He spent his free time riding a bike and playing football. He completed primary and secondary education in Gondar town, Ethiopia. When he was a 9th grade student, he was exposed to the field of human evolution. A history teacher who read to the class about the discoveries of Zinjantohrpus (Australopithecus boisei) and Homo habilis by the Leakeys, published by the National Geographic Society. This information ignited his interest in the field of study.

== Education ==
In 1972, Asfaw joined Addis Ababa University, and then Haile-Selassie I University, Alemaya Agricultural College campus, located about 500 kilometers away from Addis Ababa, in Harar town. Here he took Life Sciences as a first year student. In his second year, he joined the Geology Department of the Addis Ababa Science Campus, majoring in Geology and minoring in Chemistry. However, his university studies were interrupted because of the Ethiopian revolution in 1974. He rejoined the university in 1978 and graduated with a Bachelor of Science in geology in 1980. He then joined the graduate program of the University of California at Berkeley in 1981, where his advisor was J. Desmond Clark. He wanted to specialise in African prehistory. Berhane was invited by Clark to join Clark's Middle Awash field research group. This exposure to fieldwork redefined his interest and he changed the focus of his field of study from African Prehistory to Physical Anthropology. His PhD thesis was supervised by Tim White, and he graduated from Berkeley in 1989.

== Career ==
Before attending Berkeley for graduate school, Asfaw had a one-month archaeological field experience with French archaeologist, Jean Chavaillon, at Melaka Konture in 1979. This was his first field experience where he saw abundant stone tools and fossilized bones excavated. He's a member of the National Academy of Sciences. Berhane has been working for the past 25 years as a private researcher at the Ethiopian Ministry of Culture, Centre for Research and Conservation of Cultural Heritage. He established the first research laboratory at the National Museum of Ethiopia. Berhane spearheaded major archeological expeditions into Afar region that led to the ground breaking discoveries in human evolution. In 1981 he co-founded the Middle Awash Research Group. He faced considerable challenges during the Derg period when many of his colleagues were arrested and killed. In addition, Berhane was critical of the Derg's disregard of archeological sites when the Melka Wakena Dam was built in 1988 on a precious open archeological site. In 1992, his group discovered the earliest Acheulean in which the results were the cover feature in Nature. He credits this major discovery in part to the EPRDF bringing stability to Ethiopia thus allowing the research group to work in remote areas. The next major discovery was in 1997, when his group discovered Australopithecus garhi. The fossilized remains of Homo sapiens idaltu were discovered at Herto Bouri near the Middle Awash. Over the years his excavations continued to find Australopithecus anamensis and Homo erectus as well as discovering five new species making Ethiopia the richest site of early human ancestry.

== Honors and awards ==
- Foreign Associate Member of the National Academy of Sciences, USA; Since 2008.
- Member of the World Academy of Sciences (TWAS) since 2010
- Founding member of the National Academy of Sciences, Ethiopia; since 2010
- Certificate of Recognition from the Government of Ethiopia, 2015

== Publications ==
Since completing his Ph.D. in 1989 Asfaw has been continuing his work in Ethiopia. Specifically, he has worked in the Middle Awash, Chorora and Konso research areas. Below is a sample of publications that focus on his discoveries in this region.

- 1994 White, T. D., Suwa, G. and Asfaw, B. Australopithecus ramidus, a new species of early hominid from Aramis, Ethiopia. Nature 371: 306–312.
- 1995 White, T.D., Suwa, G. and Asfaw, B. Corrigendum: Australopithecus ramidus, a new species of early hominid from Aramis, Ethiopia. Nature 375:88.
- 1997 Suwa, G., Asfaw, B., Beyene, Y., White, T. D., Katoh, S., Nagaoka, S., Nakaya, H., Uzawa, K., Renne, P., and WoldeGabriel, G. The first skull of Australopithecus boisei. Nature 389:6650:489-492.
- 1999 Asfaw, B., White, T. D., Lovejoy, O., Latimer, B., Simpson, S., Suwa, G., Australopithecus garhi: A new species of early hominid from Ethiopia. Science 284:629-635.
- 2002 Asfaw, B., Gilbert, W. H., Beyene, Y., Hart, W. K., Renne, P. R., WoldeGabriel, G., Verba, E. S. and White, T. D. Remains of Homo erectus from Bouri, Middle Awash, Ethiopia. Nature.416: 317–320.
