= Plio-Pleistocene =

Informally described period

The Plio-Pleistocene is an informally described geological pseudo-period, which begins about 5 million years ago (Mya) and, drawing forward, combines the time ranges of the formally defined Pliocene and Pleistocene epochs—marking from about 5 Mya to about 12 kya. Nominally, the Holocene epoch—the last 12 thousand years—would be excluded, but most Earth scientists would probably treat the current times as incorporated into the term "Plio-Pleistocene"; see below.

In the contexts of archaeology, paleontology, and paleoanthropology, the Plio-Pleistocene is a very useful period to which scientists may assign the long and continuous run in East Africa of datable sedimentary layers and their contents (e.g. the Bouri Formation). These contents collectively present a focused view of the continuous evolution of the region's large vertebrates, especially the evolution of some African apes (hominids) to the earliest hominins; and then the development of the early humans and their toolmaking cultures. This shorter pseudo-period—from after 5 Mya to about 1.5 Mya—straddles the boundary between the Pliocene and the Pleistocene. Thereafter the Plio-Pleistocene formations in East Africa contain, and disclose, the genus Homo developing into archaic Homo sapiens, then to anatomically modern humans.

The term is also useful in climatology and Earth sciences because the greater Plio-Pleistocene period covers the gradual but prolonged long-term cooling of the Earth's atmosphere from the generally warmer temperatures of the late Oligocene / early Neogene times to and continuing through the Late Pleistocene—and indeed continuing through current times, if the present interglacial warming is considered as merely superimposed on the longer trend of cooling. Beginning about 3 Mya, the late Pliocene saw the start of glaciation in the Northern Hemisphere, and many authors may informally use the term "Plio-Pleistocene" as a synonym for the period during which the Northern Hemisphere has been glaciated.

== See also ==
- Australopithecine, straddle the Plio-Pleistocene
