= Bouri Formation =

Archeological area in Afar Region, Ethiopia

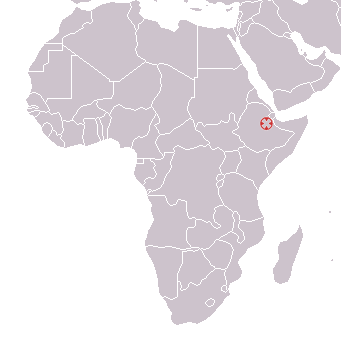
Location of the Bouri Formation and the Afar Triangle (Afar Depression), Ethiopia

The Bouri Formation is a sequence of sedimentary deposits that is the source of australopithecine and Homo (that is, hominin) fossils, artifacts, and bones of large mammals with cut marks from butchery with tools by early hominins. It is located in the Middle Awash Valley, in Ethiopia, East Africa, and is a part of the Afar Depression that has provided rich human fossil sites such as Gona and Hadar.

The Bouri Formation stretches down much of the length and breadth of the Bouri "peninsula", which projects across the dry bed of the Afar Depression. The Formation is sufficiently eroded to expose three geological members or layers: the Hatayae, the Dakanihylo, and the Herto. Human remains with signs of having been prepared for burial have been found in the Upper Herto layers.

== Geology ==
The Bouri "peninsula" is a geological fault-raised horst that diverts the Awash River, forming a partial dam and creating Lake Yardi; and it contains the Bouri Formation. The peninsula is about 4 km wide by 10 km long, and lies in a NNW-SSE direction in the Quaternary-period rift zone in the southern part of the Afar Depression (Afar Triangle).

The Bouri Formation is a sediment area some 80 m thick that stretches down much of the length and breath of the peninsula. The formation consists of three geological units, called members, from which fossils and artifacts of different periods of human evolution have been excavated. They are: the lowest member, named Hatayae, or the Hata, dated to 2.5 million years ago (mya)—and in which fossils of Australopithecus garhi were found; the Dakanihylo, or Daka, member, one mya—fossils of Homo erectus were found; and the Herto member, Lower layer at 260 kya, and Upper layers at 160 to 154 kya—fossils of Homo sapiens idaltu were found.

The area is important because active tectonics in the Afar Depression created varying habitats for early hominins across the most recent few million years known informally as the Plio-Pleistocene. These habitats, laid down in sedimentary rocks, have since been uplifted, which allowed their erosion over time and their accessibility today to paleoanthropologists. Volcanic eruptions have left volcanic tuff layers that enable accurate dating of the sedimentary deposits via Argon–argon dating.

== Hatayae ==
The Hatayae layer is 40 m thick at its base and is composed of variegated silt clay and paleosols, zeolitic and bentonitic tuffs, carbonates that are pedogenic, sandstone with bivalve and gastropod shells, and mudstone. It was deposited in a floodplain alongside river delta channels and a shallow fluctuating lake dated to around 2.5 mya.

In the Hatayae member have been found the remains of Australopithecus garhi, the most complete specimen of which is BOU-VP-12/130. According to Asfaw and White, et al. (1999), that species is "..descended from Australopithecus afarensis and is a candidate ancestor for early Homo."

Excavations in general have failed to disclose large numbers of stone tools. The likely explanation is the lack of raw materials on lake margins, which, in turn, is likely due to the lack of streams strong enough to carry hand-sized pebbles and the absence of nearby outcrops of basalt.

In spite of rarity, some isolated and widely scattered cores and flakes of Mode I technology have been found. The excavators (de Heinzelin, et al., 2002) report: "..our surveys and excavations have demonstrated that early hominids [hominins] were actively using stone tools on the Pliocene-Hata landscape"; and: "It is not currently possible to positively identify the creators of the earliest stone tools here or at Gona, even though A. garhi is currently the only recognized hominid [hominin] taxon recovered from Hata sediments."

Existence of stone tools is also evidenced by bones of large mammals—such as alcelaphinae (Wildebeest related bovids) and Hipparion, an extinct genus of three-toed horse—that show butchery cut marks by hominins including those made in removing an animal's tongue. "These are the earliest documented percussion marks made by hominids [hominins], who were presumably processing these bones for contained fatty marrow"; and, "These are the earliest documented cut marks made by hominids [hominins]." As concluded by the excavators, the evidence from the site shows "..a major function of the earliest known tools was meat and marrow processing of large carcasses." This pattern of butchery processing of large prey was maintained by hominins well into the Pliocene.

== Dakanihylo ==
The Dakanihylo (Daka) layer is 22 to 45 m thick and composed of pumice sandstone that is cross-bedded; it is situated in the southern half of the Bouri horst and dated to 1 mya. Fossils found in the layer suggest open grassland—some 377 species of bovids (including three new species and two new genera); and water-margin habitats—species of Kobus antelope and abundant Hippopotamus. Early Acheulean stone tools such as hand axes and cleavers have also been found in the Daka member, as well as evidence of butchery processing on equid, bovid and hippo bones.

Homo erectus fossils include the specimen BOU-VP-2/66, or the Daka skull, an incomplete skull that had an endocranial capacity of 995 cm^{3}. These fossils (of H. erectus) are important to the current debate as to whether Asian and African H. erectus were actually different human species. Asfaw, et al. (2002) reports: 1) that these fossils do not support "..the hypothesis of a deep cladogenesis between African and Asian H. erectus ..."; and 2) "..that geographic subdivision of early H. erectus into separate species lineages is biologically misleading, artificially inflating early Pleistocene species diversity." Further, they suggest that "..by 1 Myr the taxon had colonized much of the Old World without speciating. A finding of considerable biogeographic and behavioural significance".

== Herto ==
The Herto layers consist of a 15–20 m thick main sequence found in the southwestern part of the Bouri peninsula. The division between the Lower and Upper Herto layers is characterized by an erosion surface filled with rounded pebbles.

=== Lower Herto ===
This layer presents lignite, veins of pink carbonate, and silty clays (of predominantly lake origin) containing gastropod and bivalve fossils; it is dated to 260 thousands of years ago (kya). Late Acheulean tools are found associated with hominin remains as yet unclassified. Humans in this habitat lived next to a freshwater lake and killed large mammals such as hippopotamids.

=== Upper Herto ===
The Upper Herto member changes to yellow sandstone (from the fluvial and lake-margin deposits of the lower layer), and dates to between 160 and 154 kya. Immediately above the erosion surface separating the two layers is a sequence of volcanic sandstone and gravel deposits of variable thicknesses. It shows cross-bedded sedimentation containing pumice rocks and has produced all the human fossils and tools found in the Upper layer. The Upper layer is topped by a volcanic tuff. Two volcanic layers of very fine ash occur, one just below the hominin fossils and one just above; this important feature allows accurate argon–argon dating of adjacent sedimentary layers and their fossils, as reported above. This is valuable "..because the accurate dating of faunas and artefacts of many sites of this general antiquity in Pleistocene Africa has proved notoriously difficult."

In this layer have been found early Middle Stone Age (MSA) tools and the remains of Homo sapiens idaltu. Most of the tools are scrapers, cleavers, and various lithic cores; but hand axes, picks and blades are rare. Most stone tools are made of fine-grained basalt except for points and blades made from obsidian. Many are made with the Levallois technique; these are comparable to those found in the Garba III layer at Melka Kunture.

As at Herto, Garba III includes terminal Acheulean hand axes, typical Levalloisian method, and many retouched tools on flakes (side-scrapers and end-scrapers, backed knives, burins, unifacial and bifacial points). The Garba III assemblage has been considered transitional between the Acheulean and the MSA.

In this layer are found a large number of Hippopotamus bones: "One occurrence shows abundant remains of several hippo calves, mostly newborn to a few weeks old, scattered together with butchered adults".

=== Mortuary practices ===
Of 15 of the 24 recovered fragments of humans in the Upper Herto layer have cut marks due to soft tissue removal. Clark, et al., (2003) reports that "The latter pattern of bone surface modification is almost never present in hominid [hominin] or nonhuman faunal remains processed for consumption, and is therefore unlikely to represent evidence of utilitarian or economic behaviour." On one skull, "..this defleshing manipulation must have occurred after removal of the mandible. The intentional and deliberate removal of soft tissues such as basicranial vessels, nerves and muscles is therefore indicated. The specimen lacks the entire occipital region surrounding the foramen magnum, and the edges of this broken region are smooth and polished, as are the specimen’s unweathered parietal surfaces."

Ethnographic study upon modern cultures suggests that such post-mortem manipulation could be due to "..curation of human remains as part of mortuary practices".

== See also ==
- Omo remains
- List of fossil sites
- List of fossiliferous stratigraphic units in Ethiopia
