= Daka skull =

Homo erectus calvaria, discovered in the Ethiopian Rift Valley in 1997

Daka calvaria
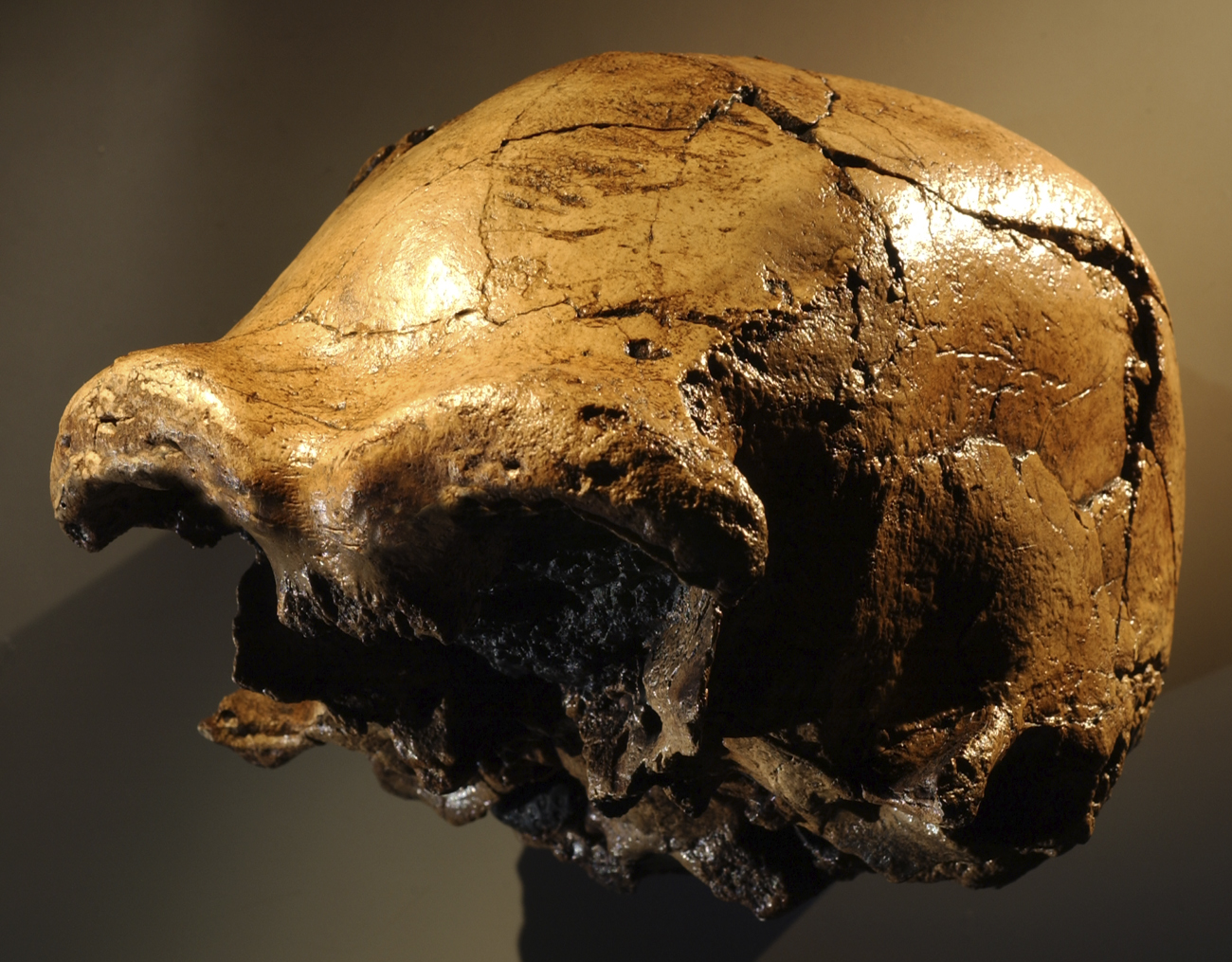
- Catalog no.: BOU-VP-2/66
- Common name: Daka calvaria
- Species: Homo erectus
- Age: 1 million years
- Place discovered: Ethiopia
- Date discovered: 1997

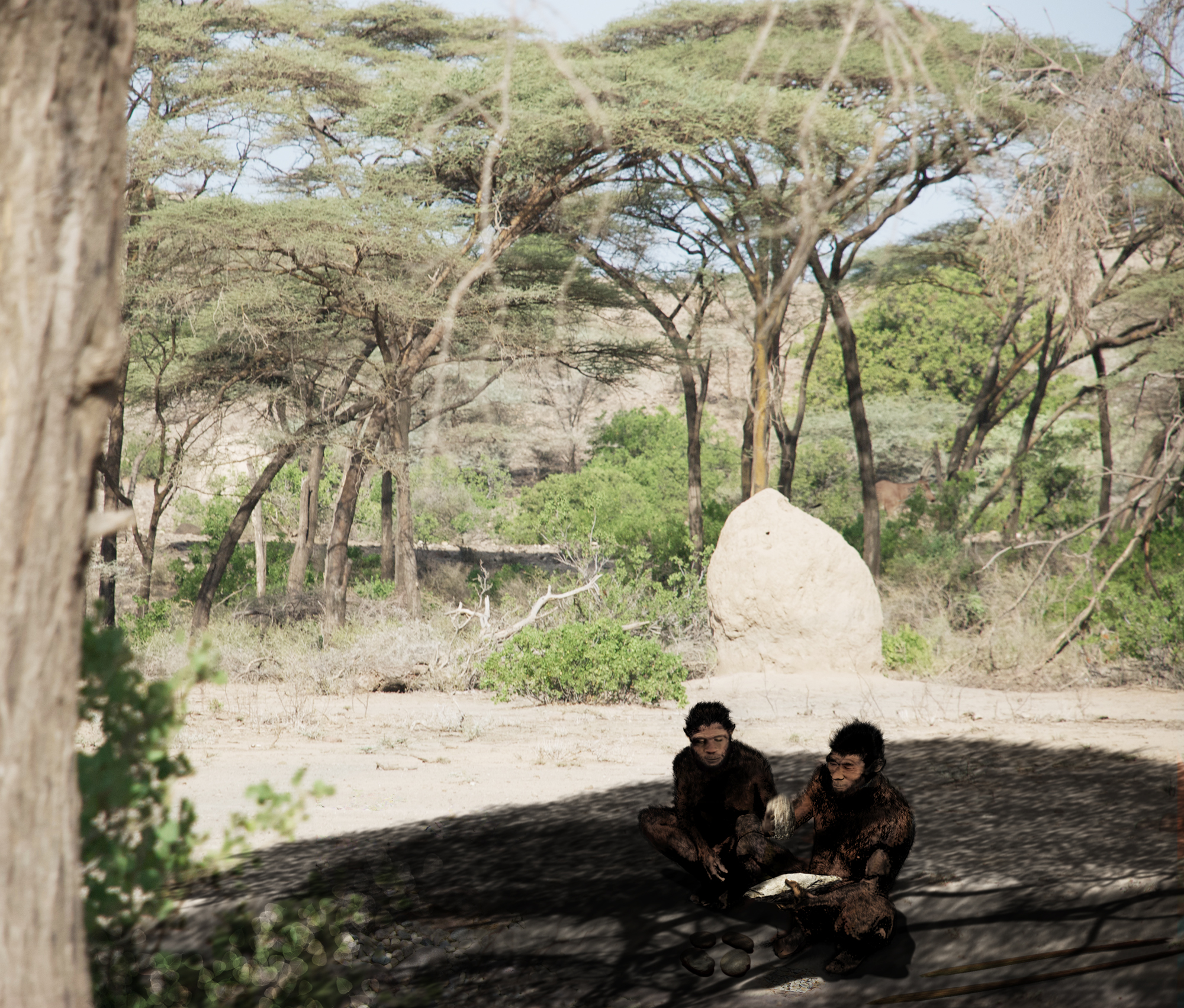
Restoration based on evidence from the Daka Member, Ethiopia

The Daka calvaria, otherwise known as the Daka skull (a skull cap with the cranial base), or specimen number BOU-VP-2/66, is a Homo erectus specimen from the Daka Member of the Bouri Formation in the Middle Awash Study Area of the Ethiopian Rift Valley.

It is reported that the metrics and morphological attributes of the Daka calvaria center it firmly within the Homo erectus lineage. The resemblance to the Asian counterparts indicates that early African and Eurasian fossil hominids represent a subdivision of a widespread paleospecies. Daka's anatomical intermediacy between "earlier and later African fossils provides evidence of evolutionary change. Its temporal and geographic position indicates that African H. erectus was the ancestor of Homo sapiens.”

It was discovered in 1997 by Henry Gilbert. With it are several other H. erectus specimens (leg bones, cranial fragments, and a toothless mandible), a large assortment of Acheulean industry stone tools, and several hundred animal fossils. The locality dates to about one million years old.

== Origin ==
The one-million-year-old Homo sample BOU-VP-2/66 from the Dakanihylo Member, referred to as “Daka” calvaria, was discovered in Bouri, Ethiopia, found in the Middle Awash region of the Afar Rift. This area has, not surprisingly, been the source of many human ancestor fossils, with ages ranging from half a million years old to more than 6 million years old. The resemblance of the Daka Skull to Asian counterparts indicates that the early Eurasian and African fossil hominids represent demes of a widespread palaeospecies. The anatomical intermediacy of Daka between earlier and later African fossils provides evolutionary change evidence. There is a consensus that there is a “lack of calvarial evidence for a deep phylo-genetic division between the African and Asian fossils.”

According to researchers, a phenetic approach, quantifying overall similarity of single specimens, found that the Daka calvaria shares affinities with two fossils from the Koobi Fora region of Africa, KNM-ER 3733 and KNM-ER 3883. These are attributed to Homo ergaster, which is very different from Homo erectus.

== Cranial morphology ==
The Daka Calvaria has a cranial capacity of 995cc (for reference, a chimp has about 375cc and a human about 1,200cc). Through the use of computed tomographic (CT) imagery of the Daka calvaria, observations have been made on the distortion, subcortical structures and endocranial features of this skull fossil. According to the CT-derived metrics for the Daka calvaria, the occipital Asterion thickness was 10.6 mm, with the temporal Asterion thickness measuring at 10.2mm. The Calvarial height above g-l, above g-op and above n-op, were measured at 51mm, 73mm and 80mm, respectively; Endocranial capacity was found to be around 986ml. The strong flexion that is apparent in Daka strengthens the theory that midsagittal cranial base flexion was strong in Homo erectus in general.

Due to the age and condition of the Daka skull, the fossil is not fully intact. The right side of the calvaria is slightly more damaged and there is a relatively large space in the posterior region of the mastoid area near the Asterion. Researchers found that the mastoid process of the artifact are both damaged extensively. “Neither side preserves the inferior portions, but pneumatization of the temporal bone superior to the mastoid tips extends superiorly nearly to Asterion on both sides.” The temporals on the skull are not as inflated as those of apes, with smaller individual cells. The Daka calvaria temporal squamae measure at approximately 5.7mm thick centrally. The posterior temporal is approximately 10.6mm thick adjacent to the occipitomastoid suture.
