= Retouch (lithics) =

Retouch is the act of producing scars on a stone flake after the ventral surface has been created. It can be done to the edge of an implement in order to make it into a functional tool, or to reshape a used tool. Retouch can be a strategy to reuse an existing lithic artifact and enable people to transform one tool into another tool. Depending on the form of classification that one uses, it may be argued that retouch can also be conducted on a core-tool, if such a category exists, such as a hand-axe.

Retouch may simply consist of roughly trimming an edge by striking with a hammerstone, or on smaller, finer flake or blade tools it is sometimes carried out by pressure flaking. Other forms of retouch may include burination, which is retouch that is conducted in a parallel orientation to the flake margin. Retouch is often taken as one of the most obvious features distinguishing a tool from a waste by-product of lithic manufacture (debitage).

The extent of reduction, also known as the retouch intensity, is denoted by a measure of the reduction index. There are many quantitative and qualitative methods used to measure this.

== Measuring retouch ==
Calculating the Geometric Index of Unifacial Reduction (GIUR) T = overall artefact thickness t = height of retouch scar This diagram shows how to calculate the GIUR of a unifacial lithic artefact as described in Hiscock and Clarkson (2005). Each measurement is taken at three points along the reduced edge (denoted here by subscript) and t/T ratios are calculated and averaged to produce the artefact's GIUR value. This value increases proportionally to the amount of reduction.

=== Quantitative measurements ===
There are three indices of retouch that offer significant inferential power in determining the amount of mass lost in the process of retouching. Despite particular weaknesses associated with each method, the following methods have been shown to be the most robust, versatile, sensitive, and comprehensive.

==== Geometric index of unifacial reduction (GIUR) ====
This method uses measurements of flake thickness and the height of retouch scars to produce a ratio between 0 and 1 of the index of reduction. In the original publication on GIUR by Kuhn (1990), scars are measured at three points (t) along the retouched edge (usually at proximal, medial, and distal points) and then divided by the overall thickness (T) to produce this ratio. The equation is GIUR= ((t1+t2+t3)/3)/T. However, scholars have recently revised Kuhn's methods by measuring T at each point t is measured. The updated calculation is GIUR= (t1/T1+ t2/T2 + t3/T3)/3. The new method creates more data points and may erase biases caused by high variation in artefact thickness. Typically, higher GIUR values indicate more invasive or extensive retouch. Calipers can be used to measure the height of the retouch scar or a goniometer can be used to measure the angle of the retouch and the height can be calculated with the equation t=D sin(a), where "D" is scar length and "a" is angle of retouch. Limitations of the GIUR are its restriction to use on unifacially retouched flakes and that as values increase, they are less able to accurately represent mass loss, because once retouch meets or succeeds the dorsal spine, t/T ratios decline

Measuring retouch on a stone artifact using the Index of Invasiveness

==== Invasiveness index ====
This index divides both the dorsal and ventral surface of a flake into eight sections each and calculates a score of how invasive the retouch is. It is based on adding up individual scores from each of the eight sections (each section gets a score of 0, 0.5, or 1) and dividing the total by the number of sections. This index can be used on both unifacially and bifacially retouched flakes.

==== Initial-/terminal-mass comparison (ITMC) ====
This index estimates the initial flake mass through the use of laser scanners and the measurement of platform area and exterior platform angle. The platform must be fully intact in order to use this method.

==== Other measures of retouch ====
- Ratio of ventral area to platform area
- Hafted biface retouch index
- Estimated reduction percentage (ERP)
- Ratio of retouched edge to total perimeter

=== Qualitative measures of retouch ===
==== Retouch morphology ====
This consists of identifying the scar morphology of the retouch. There may be more than one type of scar morphology on a single flake. There are three types of scar morphology.

1. Scaled retouch scars
These are short, become wider at their distal end, and along the flake edge have an acute angle.

2. Stepped retouch scars
These are short, have stepped terminations at their distal end, and along the flake edge have a higher angle.

3. Parallel retouch scars
These are roughly parallel to one another and run along the flake margin.

==== Retouch direction ====
This is essentially the direction in which the retouch was removed. There are five common directions of retouch.

1. Obverse retouch
This is retouch that is struck from the ventral surface, causing scars to show up on the dorsal margin. This happens to be the most commonly present retouch direction.

2. Inverse retouch
This is retouch that is struck from the dorsal surface, causing scars to show up on the ventral margins.

3. Alternate retouch
This is present when obverse retouch is apparent on one flake margin, while inverse retouch is apparent on the opposing flake margin.

4. Alternating retouch
This is when obverse and inverse retouch are both present on the same flake margin, but on differing parts of that margin.

5. Bifacial retouch
This is when obverse and inverse retouch are present on the same area of the same flake margin.

==== Retouch location ====
This is quite simply a description of where exactly the retouch is located on the flake. The key here is to be very specific. The retouch extensiveness for each area should also be described. This entails whether the retouch is total or partial. Proper flake terminology should be used in these descriptions.

== Ethnographic research ==
Through ethnographic research in Central Australia, Hiscock found that retouch may be conducted on a flake that is ultimately rejected as a tool for use. This shows that retouch may, in some cases, not be a sign of extending the use life of a tool. It may simply be an attempt to make a tool viable for use in the first place and can indicate that particular tool's unsuitability for use. This calls into question many of the basic assumptions made based on retouch and suggests that archaeologists may need to rethink exactly what retouch may mean.
