= Omo remains =

Hominin fossils discovered in Ethiopia

Coordinates: 4°48′1.27″N 35°58′1.45″E

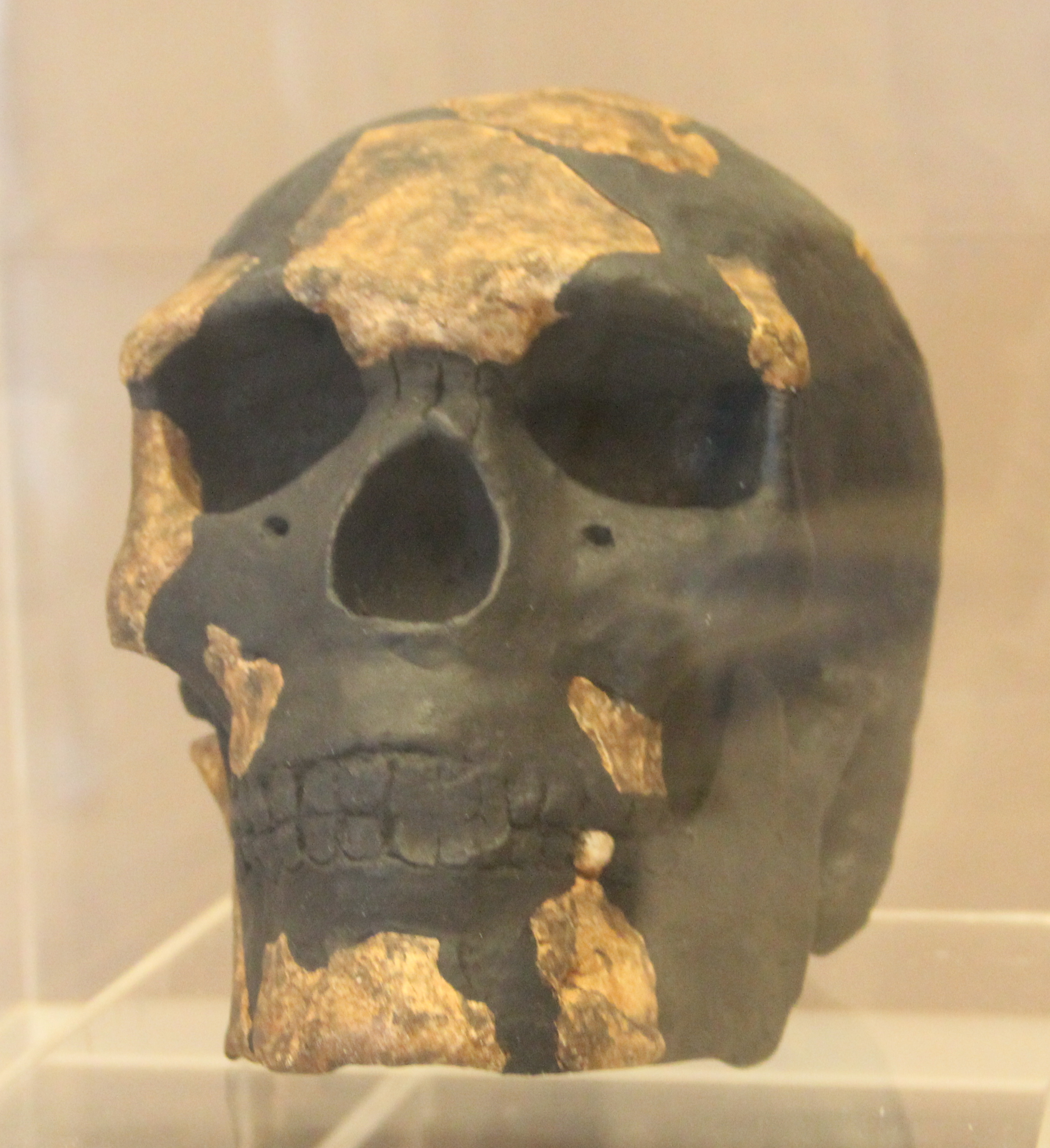
Reproduction of the head of the Omo hominin in the Musée des Civilisations Noires de Dakar (Sénégal).

The Omo remains are a collection of hominin (Note: This article quotes historic texts that use the terms 'hominid' and 'hominin' with meanings that may be different from their modern usages. This is because several revisions in classifying the great apes have caused the use of the term "hominid" to vary over time. Its original meaning referred only to humans (Homo) and their closest relatives. That restrictive usage has been largely assumed by the term "hominin", which comprises all members of the human clade after the split from the chimpanzees (Pan). The modern meaning of the term "hominid" refers to all the great apes, including humans. Usage still varies, however, and some scientists and laypersons still use the term in the original restrictive sense; the scholarly literature generally will show the traditional usage until around the end of the 20th century. For further information, see Hominini (at "hominins") and Hominidae (at discussion of the terms "hominid" and "hominin" in the lede section). In this article, hominid is italicized when the traditional term is necessary to keep as-is—as in a quotation, or a record, or a title, etc.) bones discovered between 1967 and 1974 at the Omo Kibish sites near the Omo River, in Omo National Park in south-western Ethiopia. The bones were recovered by a scientific team from the Kenya National Museums directed by Richard Leakey and others. The remains from Kamoya's Hominid Site (KHS) were called Omo I and those from Paul I. Abell's Hominid Site (PHS) were called Omo II.

== Fossils ==
The bones found include two partial skulls, four jaws, a legbone, approximately two hundred teeth, and several other fossilized parts. Both of the specimens, Omo I and Omo II, are classified as anatomically modern humans (Homo sapiens), but they differ from each other in morphological traits. The Omo I fossils indicate more modern traits, while studies of the postcranial remains of Omo II indicate an overall modern human morphology with some primitive features. The fossils were found in a layer of tuff, between a lower, older geologic layer named Member I and a higher, newer layer dubbed Member III. The Omo I and Omo II hominin fossils were taken from similar stratigraphic levels above Member I.

Because of the very limited fauna and the few stone artifacts that were found at the sites when the original Omo remains were discovered, the provenance and estimated age of the Kibish hominids are uncertain. In 2008, new bone remains were discovered from Awoke's Hominid Site (AHS). The AHS fossil's tibia and fibula were unearthed from Member I, the same layer from which the other Omo remains derive.

== Dating and implications ==
About 30 years after the original finds, a detailed stratigraphic analysis of the area surrounding the fossils was conducted. The Member I layer was argon-dated to 195,000 years ago, and the (higher layer) Member III was dated to 105,000 years ago. Numerous recent lithic records verify the tool technology from Members I and III to the Middle Stone Age.

The lower layer, Member I, (below the fossils) is considerably older than the 160,000-year-old Herto remains designated as Homo sapiens idaltu. The rainy conditions at that time—which are known from isotopic ages on the Kibish Formation corresponding to the ages of Mediterranean sapropels—suggest increased flow of the Nile River and, therefore, increased flow of the Omo River. But the climates changed such that, after 185,000 years ago conditions were so dry as to not allow speleothems to grow in the caverns in the Levantine land-bridge region, the vital inroad for migration to Eurasia.

Parts of the fossils are the earliest to have been classified by Leakey as Homo sapiens. In 2004, the geological layers around the fossils were dated, with the age of the "Kibish hominids" estimated at 195±5 ka [thousand years ago]. For some time, these were the oldest known fossils classified as H. sapiens (the Florisbad Skull is older, but its classification as H. sapiens was then disputed). With the dating of the Jebel Irhoud 1–5 to before 250 ka (315 ± 34 ka, and 286±32 ka) in 2017, as well as the classification of the Florisbad Skull as H. sapiens, this is no longer the case.

In 2022, a study by Vidal et al. found an earlier age for the Omo fossils than previously reported, revising the date assigned to them as, a minimum date of approximately 233,000 years old.

== See also ==
- List of fossil sites (with link directory)
- List of human fossils
- Recent African origin of modern humans
