= Early human migrations =

Human range expansion across the world

Successive dispersals of Homo erectus greatest extent (yellow), Homo neanderthalensis greatest extent (ochre) Homo sapiens (red), with the numbers of years since they are first recorded before present.

The earliest migrations and expansions of archaic and modern humans across continents are believed to have begun approximately 2 million years ago with the early expansions out of Africa by Homo erectus. This initial migration was followed by other archaic humans including H. heidelbergensis, which lived around 500,000 years ago and was the likely ancestor of Denisovans and Neanderthals as well as modern humans. Early hominids had likely crossed land bridges that have now sunk.

Within Africa, Homo sapiens dispersed around the time of its speciation, roughly 300,000 years ago. (Note: Based on Schlebusch et al., "Southern African ancient genomes estimate modern human divergence to 350,000 to 260,000 years ago", Fig. 3 (H. sapiens divergence times) and Stringer (2012), (archaic admixture).) The recent African origin theory suggests that the anatomically modern humans outside of Africa descend from a population of Homo sapiens migrating from East Africa roughly 70–50,000 years ago and spreading along the southern coast of Asia and to Oceania by about 50,000 years ago. Modern humans spread across Europe about 40,000 years ago.

Early Eurasian Homo sapiens fossils have been found in Misliya Cave (Israel), dated to around 194,000–177,000 years old. It has also been claimed by some paleoanthropologists that a skull fragment found in Apidima Cave (Greece), dated to around 210,000 years old, may have belonged to Homo sapiens, although that skull fragment can't be confidently attributed to Homo sapiens. These fossils seem to represent failed dispersal attempts by early Homo sapiens, who may have been replaced by local Neanderthal populations.

The migrating modern human populations are known to have interbred with earlier local populations, so that contemporary human populations are descended in small part (below 10% contribution) from regional varieties of archaic humans. (Note: Archaic admixture from various sources is known from Europe and Asia (Neanderthals), Southeast Asia and Melanesia (Denisovans) as well as from Western and Southern Africa. The proportion of admixture varies by region, but in all cases has been reported below 10%: In Eurasian mostly estimated at 1–4% (with a high estimate of 3.4–7.3% by Lohse (2014)) in Melanesians estimated at 4–6% (Reich et al. (2010)). Admixture of an unknown archaic hominin in Sub-Saharan African hunter-gatherer populations was estimated at 2% (Hammer et al. (2011)).)

After the Last Glacial Maximum, North Eurasian populations migrated to the Americas about 20,000 years ago. Arctic Canada and Greenland were reached by the Paleo-Eskimo expansion around 4,000 years ago. Finally, Polynesia within the past 2,000 years in the last wave of the Austronesian expansion.

== Early humans (before Homo sapiens) ==
The earliest humans developed out of australopithecine ancestors about 3 million years ago, most likely in the area of the Kenyan Rift Valley, where the oldest known stone tools have been found. Stone tools recently discovered at the Shangchen site in China and dated to 2.12 million years ago are claimed to be the earliest known evidence of hominins outside Africa, surpassing Dmanisi in Georgia by 300,000 years.

=== Homo erectus ===
Between 2 and less than a million years ago, Homo spread throughout East Africa and to Southern Africa (Homo ergaster), but not yet to West Africa. Around 1.8 million years ago, Homo erectus migrated out of Africa via the Levantine corridor and Horn of Africa to Eurasia. This migration has been proposed as being related to the operation of the Saharan pump, around 1.9 million years ago. Homo erectus dispersed throughout most of the Old World, reaching as far as Southeast Asia. Its distribution is traced by the Oldowan lithic industry, by 1.3 million years ago extending as far north as the 40th parallel (Xiaochangliang).

Key sites for this early migration out of Africa are Riwat in Pakistan (~2 Ma?), Ubeidiya in the Levant (1.5 Ma) and Dmanisi in the Caucasus (1.81 ± 0.03 Ma, p=0.05).

China shows evidence of Homo erectus from 2.12 mya in Gongwangling, in Lantian county. Two Homo erectus incisors have been found near Yuanmou, southern China, and are dated to 1.7 mya, and a cranium from Lantian has been dated to 1.63 mya. Artefacts from Majuangou III and Shangshazui in the Nihewan basin, northern China, have been dated to 1.6–1.7 mya. The archaeological site of Xihoudu (西侯渡) in Shanxi province is the earliest recorded use of fire by Homo erectus, which is dated 1.27 million years ago.

Southeast Asia (Java) was reached about 1.7 million years ago (Meganthropus). Western Europe was first populated around 1.2 million years ago (Atapuerca).

Robert G. Bednarik has suggested that Homo erectus may have built rafts and sailed oceans, a theory that has raised some controversy.

=== After Homo erectus ===
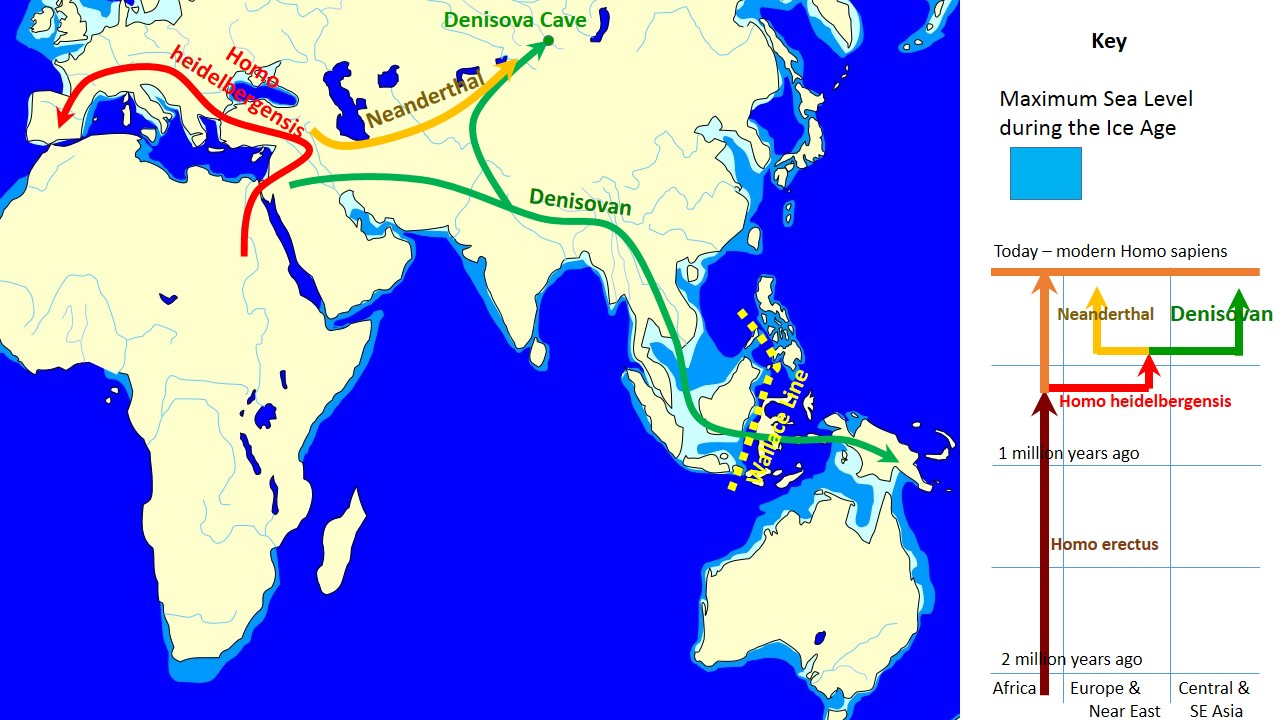
Spread of Denisovans and Neanderthals after 500,000 years ago.

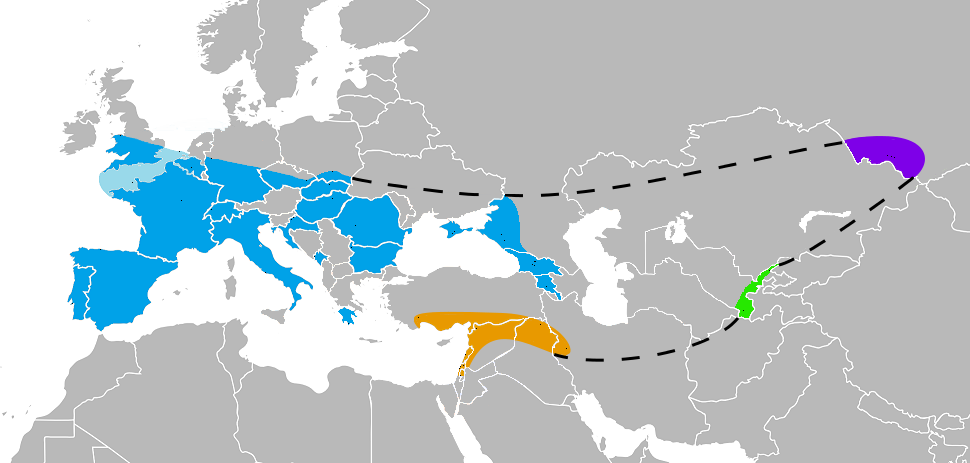
Known Neanderthal range with separate populations within Europe and the Caucasus (blue), the Near East (orange), Uzbekistan (green), and the Altai region (purple).

One million years after its dispersal, H. erectus was diverging into new species. H. erectus is a chronospecies and was never extinct, so its "late survival" is a matter of taxonomic convention. Late forms of H. erectus are thought to have survived until after about 0.5 million ago to 143,000 years ago at the latest, (Note: Homo erectus soloensis, found in Java, is considered the latest known specimen of H. erectus. Formerly dated to as late as 50,000 to 40,000 years ago, a 2011 study pushed back the date of the extinction of H. e. soloensis to 143,000 years ago at the latest, more likely before 550,000 years ago.) with derived forms classified as H. antecessor in Europe around 800,000 years ago and H. heidelbergensis in Africa around 600,000 years ago. H. heidelbergensis in its turn spread across East Africa (H. rhodesiensis) and to Eurasia, where it gave rise to Neanderthals and Denisovans.

H. heidelbergensis, Neanderthals and Denisovans expanded north beyond the 50th parallel (Eartham Pit, Boxgrove 500kya, Swanscombe Heritage Park 400kya, Denisova Cave 50 kya). It has been suggested that late Neanderthals may even have reached the boundary of the Arctic, by c. 32,000 years ago, when they were being displaced from their earlier habitats by H. sapiens, based on 2011 excavations at the site of Byzovaya in the Urals (Komi Republic, 65.02°N 57.42°E).

Other archaic human species are assumed to have spread throughout Africa by this time, although the fossil record is sparse. Their presence is assumed based on traces of admixture with modern humans found in the genome of African populations. Homo naledi, discovered in South Africa in 2013 and tentatively dated to about 300,000 years ago, may represent fossil evidence of such an archaic human species.

Neanderthals spread across the Near East and Europe, while Denisovans appear to have spread across Central and East Asia and to Southeast Asia and Oceania. There is evidence that Denisovans interbred with Neanderthals in Central Asia where their habitats overlapped. Neanderthal evidence has also been found quite late at 33,000 years ago at the 65th latitude of the Byzovaya site in the Ural Mountains. This is far outside of any otherwise known habitat, during a high ice cover period, and perhaps reflects a refugia of near extinction.

== Homo sapiens ==
=== Dispersal throughout Africa ===
Homo sapiens are believed to have emerged in Africa about 300,000 years ago, based in part on thermoluminescence dating of artifacts and remains from Jebel Irhoud, Morocco, published in 2017. (Note: "Here we report the ages, determined by thermoluminescence dating, of fire-heated flint artefacts obtained from new excavations at the Middle Stone Age site of Jebel Irhoud, Morocco, which are directly associated with newly discovered remains of H. sapiens. A weighted average age places these Middle Stone Age artefacts and fossils at 315±34 thousand years ago. Support is obtained through the recalculated uranium series with electron spin resonance date of 286±32 thousand years ago for a tooth from the Irhoud 3 hominin mandible.") The Florisbad Skull from Florisbad, South Africa, dated to about 259,000 years ago, has also been classified as early Homo sapiens. Previously, the Omo remains, excavated between 1967 and 1974 in Omo National Park, Ethiopia, and dated to 200,000 years ago, were long held to be the oldest known fossils of Homo sapiens.

In September 2019, scientists reported the computerized determination, based on 260 CT scans, of a virtual skull shape of the last common human ancestor to anatomically modern humans, representative of the earliest modern humans, and suggested that modern humans arose between 260,000 and 350,000 years ago through a merging of populations in East and South Africa.

In July 2019, anthropologists reported the discovery of 210,000 year old remains of a H. sapiens and 170,000 year old remains of a H. neanderthalensis in Apidima Cave in southern Greece, more than 150,000 years older than previous H. sapiens finds in Europe.

Early modern humans expanded to Western Eurasia and Central, Western and Southern Africa from the time of their emergence. While early expansions to Eurasia appear not to have persisted, expansions to Southern and Central Africa resulted in the deepest temporal divergence in living human populations. Early modern human expansion in sub-Saharan Africa appears to have contributed to the end of late Acheulean (Fauresmith) industries at about 130,000 years ago, although very late coexistence of archaic and early modern humans, until as late as 12,000 years ago, has been argued for West Africa in particular.

The ancestors of the modern Khoi-San expanded to Southern Africa before 150,000 years ago, possibly as early as before 260,000 years ago, (Note: Estimated split times given in the source cited (in kya): Human-Neanderthal: 530–690, Deep Human [H. sapiens]: 250–360, NKSP-SKSP: 150–190, Out of Africa (OOA): 70–120.) so that by the beginning of the MIS 5 "megadrought", 130,000 years ago, there were two ancestral population clusters in Africa, bearers of mt-DNA haplogroup L0 in southern Africa, ancestral to the Khoi-San, and bearers of haplogroup L1-6 in central/eastern Africa, ancestral to everyone else. There was a significant back-migration of bearers of L0 towards eastern Africa between 120 and 75 kya. (Note: "By ~130 ka two distinct groups of anatomically modern humans co-existed in Africa: broadly, the ancestors of many modern-day Khoe and San populations in the south and a second central/eastern African group that includes the ancestors of most extant worldwide populations. Early modern human dispersals correlate with climate changes, particularly the tropical African "megadroughts" of MIS 5 (marine isotope stage 5, 135–75 ka) which paradoxically may have facilitated expansions in central and eastern Africa, ultimately triggering the dispersal out of Africa of people carrying haplogroup L3 ~60 ka. Two south to east migrations are discernible within haplogroup L0. One, between 120 and 75 ka, represents the first unambiguous long-range modern human dispersal detected by mtDNA and might have allowed the dispersal of several markers of modernity. A second one, within the last 20 ka signalled by L0d, may have been responsible for the spread of southern click-consonant languages to eastern Africa, contrary to the view that these eastern examples constitute relicts of an ancient, much wider distribution.")

Expansion to Central Africa by the ancestors of the Central African forager populations (African Pygmies) most likely took place before 130,000 years ago, and certainly before 60,000 years ago. (Note: "We studied the branching history of Pygmy hunter–gatherers and agricultural populations from Africa and estimated separation times and gene flow between these populations. The model identified included the early divergence of the ancestors of Pygmy hunter–gatherers and farming populations ~60,000 years ago, followed by a split of the Pygmies' ancestors into the Western and Eastern Pygmy groups – 20,000 years ago.") Wet forest environments were not a major ecological barrier for Homo sapiens as early as around 150,000 years ago.

The situation in West Africa is difficult to interpret due to a scarcity of fossil evidence. Homo sapiens seems to have reached the western Sahelian zone by 130,000 years ago, while tropical West African sites associated with H. sapiens are known only from after 130,000 years ago. Unlike elsewhere in Africa, archaic Middle Stone Age sites appear to persist until very late, down to the Holocene boundary (12,000 years ago), pointing to the possibility of late survival of archaic humans, and late hybridization with H. sapiens in West Africa.

=== Early northern Africa dispersal ===
Populations of Homo sapiens migrated to the Levant and to Europe between 130,000 and 115,000 years ago, and possibly in earlier waves as early as 185,000 years ago. (Note: Early modern human presence outside of Africa has been proposed to date back to as early as 177,000 years ago.)

A fragment of a jawbone with eight teeth found at Misliya Cave has been dated to around 185,000 years ago. Layers dating from between 250,000 and 140,000 years ago in the same cave contained tools of the Levallois type which could put the date of the first migration even earlier if the tools can be associated with the modern human jawbone finds.

These early migrations do not appear to have led to lasting colonisation and receded by about 80,000 years ago. There is a possibility that this first wave of expansion may have reached China (or even North America) as early as 125,000 years ago, but would have died out without leaving a trace in the genome of contemporary humans.

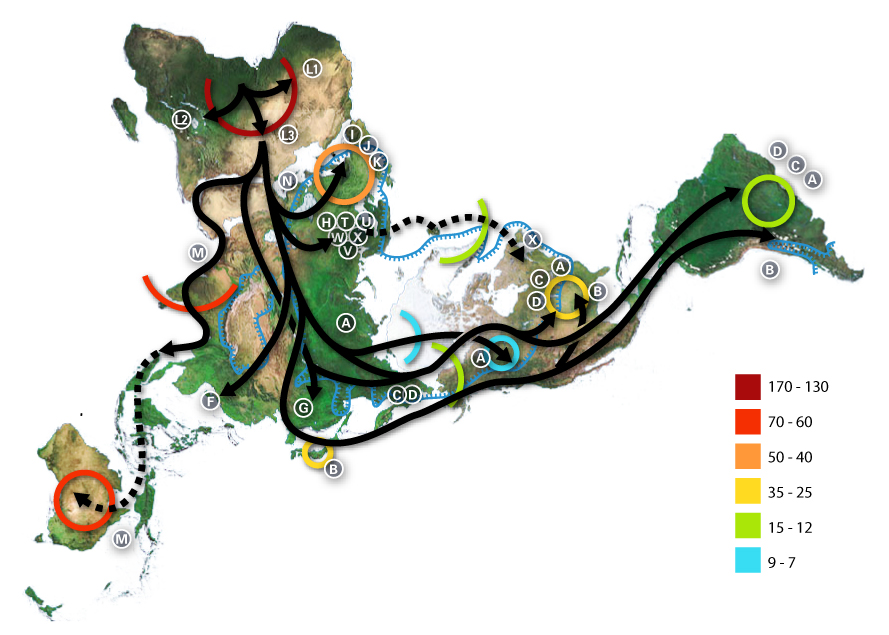
Fuller projection map showing early human migrations according to mitochondrial population genetics (numbers are millennia before present).

There is some evidence that modern humans left Africa at least 125,000 years ago using two different routes: through the Nile Valley, the Sinai Peninsula and the Levant (Qafzeh Cave: 120,000–100,000 years ago); and a second route through the present-day Bab-el-Mandeb Strait on the Red Sea (at that time, with a much lower sea level and narrower extension), crossing to the Arabian Peninsula and settling in places like the present-day United Arab Emirates (125,000 years ago) and Oman (106,000 years ago), and possibly reaching the Indian Subcontinent (Jwalapuram: 75,000 years ago.) Although no human remains have yet been found in these three places, the apparent similarities between the stone tools found at Jebel Faya, those from Jwalapuram and some from Africa suggest that their creators were all modern humans. These findings might give some support to the claim that modern humans from Africa arrived at southern China about 100,000 years ago (Zhiren Cave, Zhirendong, Chongzuo City: 100,000 years ago; (Note: The authors of Liu (2010) seem to accept that the individual has African recent ascentry, but with Asian archaic human admixture. See also Dennell (2010). Brief comments at and) and the Liujiang hominid (Liujiang County): controversially dated at 139,000–111,000 years ago). Dating results of the Lunadong (Bubing Basin, Guangxi, southern China) teeth, which include a right upper second molar and a left lower second molar, indicate that the molars may be as old as 126,000 years.

Since these previous exits from Africa did not leave traces in the results of genetic analyses based on the Y chromosome and on MtDNA, it seems that those modern humans did not survive in large numbers and were assimilated by our major antecessors. An explanation for their extinction (or small genetic imprint) may be the Toba eruption (74,000 years ago), though some argue it scarcely affected human population.

=== Coastal migration ===
Overview map of the peopling of the world by early humans during the Upper Paleolithic, following the Southern Dispersal paradigm.

The so-called "recent dispersal" of modern humans took place about 70–50,000 years ago. It is this migration wave that led to the lasting spread of modern humans throughout the world.

A small group from a population in East Africa, bearing mitochondrial haplogroup L3 and numbering possibly fewer than 1,000 individuals, crossed the Red Sea strait at Bab-el-Mandeb, to what is now Yemen, after around 75,000 years ago. A recent review has also shown support for the northern route through the Sinai Peninsula and the Levant. Their descendants spread along the coastal route around Arabia and Persia to South Asia before 55,000 years ago. Other research supports a migration out of Africa between about 65,000 and 50,000 years ago. The coastal migration between roughly 70,000 and 50,000 years ago is associated with mitochondrial haplogroups M and N, both derivative of L3.

Along the way H. sapiens interbred with Neanderthals and Denisovans, with Denisovan DNA making 0.2% of mainland Asian and Native American DNA.

==== Nearby Oceania ====
Migrations continued along the Asian coast to Southeast Asia and Oceania, colonising Australia by around 65,000–50,000 years ago. By reaching Australia, H. sapiens for the first time expanded its habitat beyond that of H. erectus. Denisovan ancestry is shared by Melanesians, Aboriginal Australians, and smaller scattered groups of people in Southeast Asia, such as the Mamanwa, a Negrito people in the Philippines, suggesting the interbreeding took place in Eastern Asia where the Denisovans lived. Denisovans may have crossed the Wallace Line, with Wallacea serving as their last refugium. Homo erectus had crossed the Lombok Strait reaching as far as Flores, but never made it to Australia.

The map shows the probable extent of land and water at the time of the last glacial maximum, 20,000 yrs ago and when the sea level was probably more than 110m lower than today.

During this time sea level was much lower and most of Maritime Southeast Asia formed one land mass known as Sunda. Migration continued Southeast on the coastal route to the straits between Sunda and Sahul, the continental land mass of present-day Australia and New Guinea. The gaps on the Weber Line are up to 90 km wide, so the migration to Australia and New Guinea would have required seafaring skills. Migration also continued along the coast eventually turning northeast to China and finally reaching Japan before turning inland. This is evidenced by the pattern of mitochondrial haplogroups descended from haplogroup M, and in Y-chromosome haplogroup C.

Sequencing of one Aboriginal genome from an old hair sample in Western Australia revealed that the individual was descended from people who migrated into East Asia between 62,000 and 75,000 years ago. This supports the theory of a single migration into Australia and New Guinea before the arrival of Modern Asians (between 25,000 and 38,000 years ago) and their later migration into North America. This migration is believed to have happened around 50,000 years ago, before Australia and New Guinea were separated by rising sea levels approximately 8,000 years ago. This is supported by a date of 50,000–60,000 years ago for the oldest evidence of settlement in Australia, around 40,000 years ago for the oldest human remains, the earliest humans artifacts which are at least 65,000 years old and the extinction of the Australian megafauna by humans between 46,000 and 15,000 years ago argued by Tim Flannery, which is similar to what happened in the Americas. The continued use of Stone Age tools in Australia has been much debated.

=== Dispersal throughout Eurasia ===
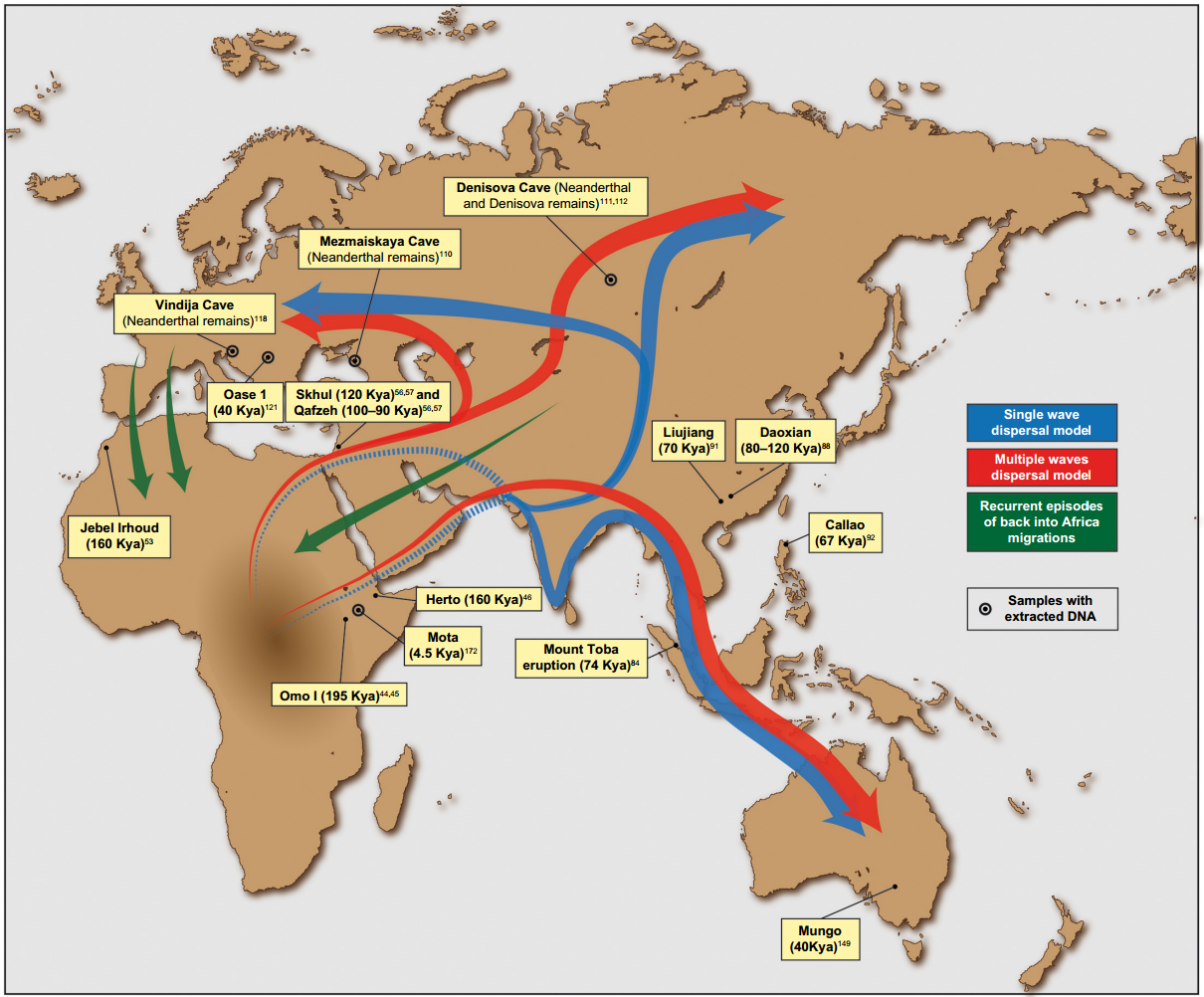
Putative migration waves out of Africa and back migrations into the continent, as well as the locations of major ancient human remains and archeological sites (López et al., 2015).

The population brought to South Asia by coastal migration appears to have remained there for some time, during roughly 60,000 to 50,000 years ago, before spreading further throughout Eurasia. This dispersal of early humans, at the beginning of the Upper Paleolithic, gave rise to the major population groups of the Old World and the Americas.

Towards the West, Upper Paleolithic populations associated with mitochondrial haplogroup R and its derivatives, spread throughout Asia and Europe, with a back-migration of M1 to North Africa and the Horn of Africa several millennia ago.

Presence in Europe is certain after 40,000 years ago, possibly as early as 43,000 years ago, rapidly replacing the Neanderthal population. Contemporary Europeans have Neanderthal ancestry, but it seems likely that substantial interbreeding with Neanderthals ceased before 47,000 years ago, i.e. took place before modern humans entered Europe.

There is evidence from mitochondrial DNA that modern humans have passed through at least one genetic bottleneck, in which genome diversity was drastically reduced. Henry Harpending has proposed that humans spread from a geographically restricted area about 100,000 years ago, the passage through the geographic bottleneck and then with a dramatic growth amongst geographically dispersed populations about 50,000 years ago, beginning first in Africa and thence spreading elsewhere. Climatological and geological evidence suggests evidence for the bottleneck. The explosion of Toba, the largest volcanic eruption of the Quaternary, may have created a 1,000 year cold period, potentially reducing human populations to a few tropical refugia. It has been estimated that as few as 15,000 humans survived. In such circumstances genetic drift and founder effects may have been maximised. The greater diversity amongst African genomes may reflect the extent of African refugia during the Toba incident. However, a recent review highlights that the single-source hypothesis of non-African populations is less consistent with ancient DNA analysis than multiple sources with genetic mixing across Eurasia.

==== Europe ====
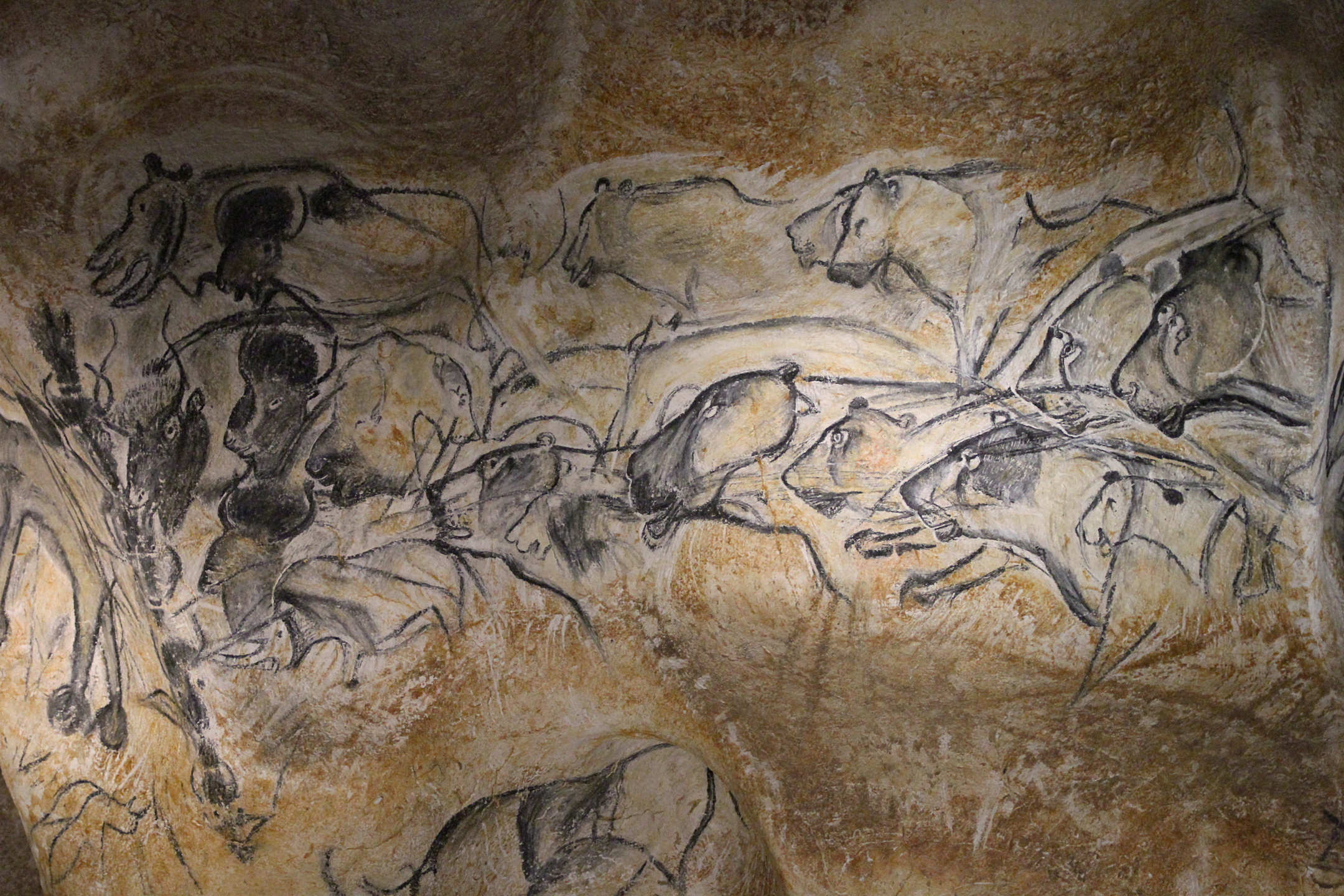
30,000-year-old cave lion and bison painting found in the Chauvet Cave, France.

The recent expansion of anatomically modern humans reached Europe around 40,000 years ago from Central Asia and the Middle East, as a result of cultural adaption to big game hunting of sub-glacial steppe fauna. Neanderthals were present both in the Middle East and in Europe, and the arriving populations of anatomically modern humans (also known as "Cro-Magnon" or European early modern humans) interbred with Neanderthal populations to a limited degree. Populations of modern humans and Neanderthal overlapped in various regions such as the Iberian peninsula and the Middle East. Interbreeding may have contributed Neanderthal genes to palaeolithic and ultimately modern Eurasians and Oceanians.

An important difference between Europe and other parts of the inhabited world was the northern latitude. Archaeological evidence suggests humans, whether Neanderthal or Cro-Magnon, reached sites in Arctic Russia by 40,000 years ago.

Cro-Magnon are considered the first anatomically modern humans in Europe. They entered Eurasia by the Zagros Mountains (near present-day Iran and eastern Turkey) around 50,000 years ago, with one group rapidly settling coastal areas around the Indian Ocean and another migrating north to the steppes of Central Asia. Modern human remains dating to 45,000-47,000 have been found in Germany, while finds of 43,000–45,000 years ago have been discovered in Italy and Britain, as well as in the European Russian Arctic from 40,000 years ago.

Humans colonised the environment west of the Urals, hunting reindeer especially, but were faced with adaptive challenges; winter temperatures averaged from −20 to −30 °C (−4 to −22 °F) with fuel and shelter scarce. They travelled on foot and relied on hunting highly mobile herds for food. These challenges were overcome through technological innovations: tailored clothing from the pelts of fur-bearing animals; construction of shelters with hearths using bones as fuel; and digging "ice cellars" into the permafrost to store meat and bones.

However, from recent research it is believed that the ecological crisis resulting from the eruption in c. 38,000 BCE of the super-volcano in the Phlegrean Fields near Naples, which left much of eastern Europe covered in ash, wiped out both the last Neanderthal and the first Homo Sapiens populations of the early Upper Paleolithic. Modern Europeans of today bear no trace of the genomes of the first Homo Sapiens Europeans, but only of those from after the ecological crisis of 38,000 BCE. Modern humans then repopulated Europe from the east after the eruption and the ice age that took place from 38,000 to 36,000 BCE.

A mitochondrial DNA sequence of two Cro-Magnons from the Paglicci Cave in Italy, dated to 23,000 and 24,000 years old (Paglicci 52 and 12), identified the mtDNA as Haplogroup N, typical of the latter group.

Cell-based simulation of the colonisation of Neanderthal habitats by modern humans, by Currat & Excoffier (2004)
(YBP = Years before present)

Up to 37,500 YBP

Up to 35,000 YBP

Up to 32,500 YBP

Up to 30,000 YBP

The expansion of modern human population is thought to have begun 45,000 years ago, and it may have taken 15,000–20,000 years for Europe to be colonized.

During this time, the Neanderthals were slowly being displaced. Because it took so long for Europe to be occupied, it appears that humans and Neanderthals may have been constantly competing for territory. The Neanderthals had larger brains, and were larger overall, with a more robust or heavily built frame, which suggests that they were physically stronger than modern Homo sapiens. Having lived in Europe for 200,000 years, they would have been better adapted to the cold weather. The anatomically modern humans known as the Cro-Magnons, with widespread trade networks, superior technology and bodies likely better suited to running, would eventually completely displace the Neanderthals, whose last refuge was in the Iberian Peninsula. Neanderthals disappeared about 40,000 years ago.

From the extent of linkage disequilibrium, it was estimated that the last Neanderthal gene flow into early ancestors of Europeans occurred 47,000–65,000 years BP. In conjunction with archaeological and fossil evidence, interbreeding is thought to have occurred somewhere in Western Eurasia, possibly the Middle East. Studies show a higher Neanderthal admixture in East Asians than in Europeans. North African groups share a similar excess of derived alleles with Neanderthals as non-African populations, whereas Sub-Saharan African groups are the only modern human populations with no substantial Neanderthal admixture. (Note: "We found that North African populations have a significant excess of derived alleles shared with Neandertals, when compared to sub-Saharan Africans. This excess is similar to that found in non-African humans, a fact that can be interpreted as a sign of Neandertal admixture. Furthermore, the Neandertal's genetic signal is higher in populations with a local, pre-Neolithic North African ancestry. Therefore, the detected ancient admixture is not due to recent Near Eastern or European migrations. Sub-Saharan populations are the only ones not affected by the admixture event with Neandertals.") The Neanderthal-linked haplotype B006 of the dystrophin gene has also been found among nomadic pastoralist groups in the Sahel and Horn of Africa, who are associated with northern populations. Consequently, the presence of this B006 haplotype on the northern and northeastern perimeter of Sub-Saharan Africa is attributed to gene flow from a non-African point of origin. (Note: "Of 1,420 sub-Saharan chromosomes, only one copy of B006 was observed in Ethiopia, and five in Burkina Faso, one among the Rimaibe and four among the Fulani and Tuareg, nomad-pastoralists known for having contacts with northern populations (supplementary table S1, Supplementary Material online). B006 only occurrence at the northern and northeastern outskirts of sub-Saharan Africa is thus likely to be a result of gene flow from a non-African source.")

==== East, Southeast and North Asia ====
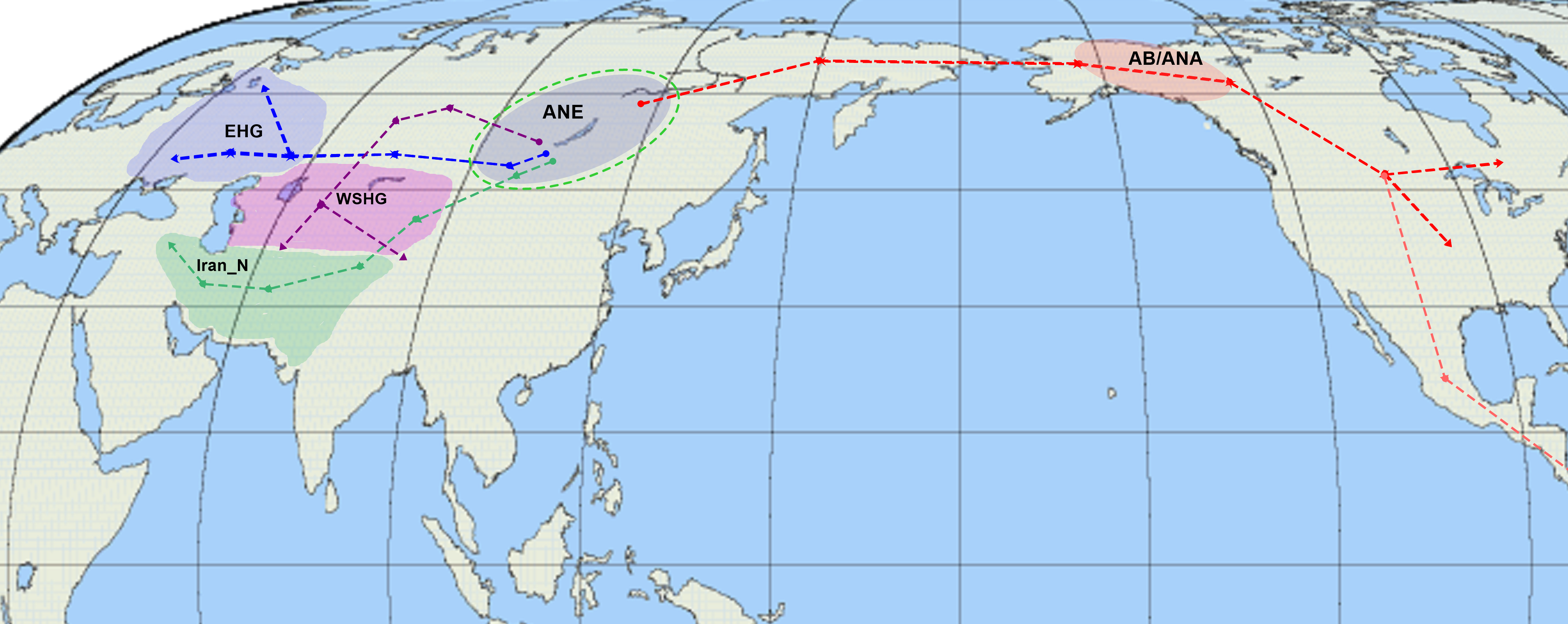
Ancient North Eurasian populations from Siberia were an important genetic contributor to Ancient Native Americans and Eastern European Hunter-Gatherers. Neolithic Iranian farmers and Jōmon people (ancestors of the Ainu people) also received geneflow from ANE-related populations.

"Tianyuan man", an individual who lived in China c. 40,000 years ago, showed substantial Neanderthal admixture. A 2017 study of the ancient DNA of Tianyuan Man found that the individual is related to modern Asian and Native American populations. A 2013 study found Neanderthal introgression of 18 genes within the chromosome 3p21.31 region (HYAL region) of East Asians. The introgressive haplotypes were positively selected in only East Asian populations, rising steadily from 45,000 years ago until a sudden increase of growth rate around 5,000 to 3,500 years ago. They occur at very high frequencies among East Asian populations in contrast to other Eurasian populations (e.g. European and South Asian populations). The findings also suggest that this Neanderthal introgression occurred within the ancestral population shared by East Asians and Native Americans.

A 2016 study presented an analysis of the population genetics of the Ainu people of northern Japan as key to the reconstruction of the early peopling of East Asia. The Ainu were found to represent a more basal branch than the modern farming populations of East Asia, suggesting an ancient (pre-Neolithic) connection with northeast Siberians. A 2013 study associated several phenotypical traits associated with Mongoloids with a single mutation of the EDAR gene, dated to c. 35,000 years ago. (Note: Traits affected by the mutation are sweat glands, teeth, hair shaft thickness and breast tissue.) (Note: East Asian genetics shows a number of concentrated alleles suggestive of selection pressures. This concerns the genes EDAR, ADH1B, ABCC1, and ALDH2 in particular. The East Asian types of ADH1B are associated with rice domestication and would thus have arisen after the c. 11,000 years ago.)

Mitochondrial haplogroups A, B and G originated about 50,000 years ago, and bearers subsequently colonized Siberia, Korea and Japan, by about 35,000 years ago. Parts of these populations migrated to North America during the Last Glacial Maximum. Indeed, the Last Glacial Maximum promoted range contractions toward southern regions, followed by posterior range re-expansions toward the north, in North Asia populations that shaped their spatial genetic gradients.

A review paper by Melinda A. Yang (in 2022) summarized and concluded that a distinctive "Basal-East Asian population" referred to as 'East- and Southeast Asian lineage' (ESEA); which is ancestral to modern East Asians, Southeast Asians, Polynesians, and Siberians, originated in Mainland Southeast Asia at ~50,000BC, and expanded through multiple migration waves southwards and northwards respectively. This ESEA lineage gave rise to various sublineages, and is also ancestral to the Hoabinhian hunter-gatherers of Southeast Asia and the ~40,000 year old Tianyuan lineage found in Northern China, but already differentiated and distinct from European-related and Australasian-related lineages, found in other regions of prehistoric Eurasia. The ESEA lineage trifurcated from an earlier East-Eurasian or "eastern non-African" (ENA) meta-population, which also contributed to the formation of Ancient Ancestral South Indians (AASI) as well as to Australasians.

=== Last Glacial Maximum ===
==== Eurasia ====
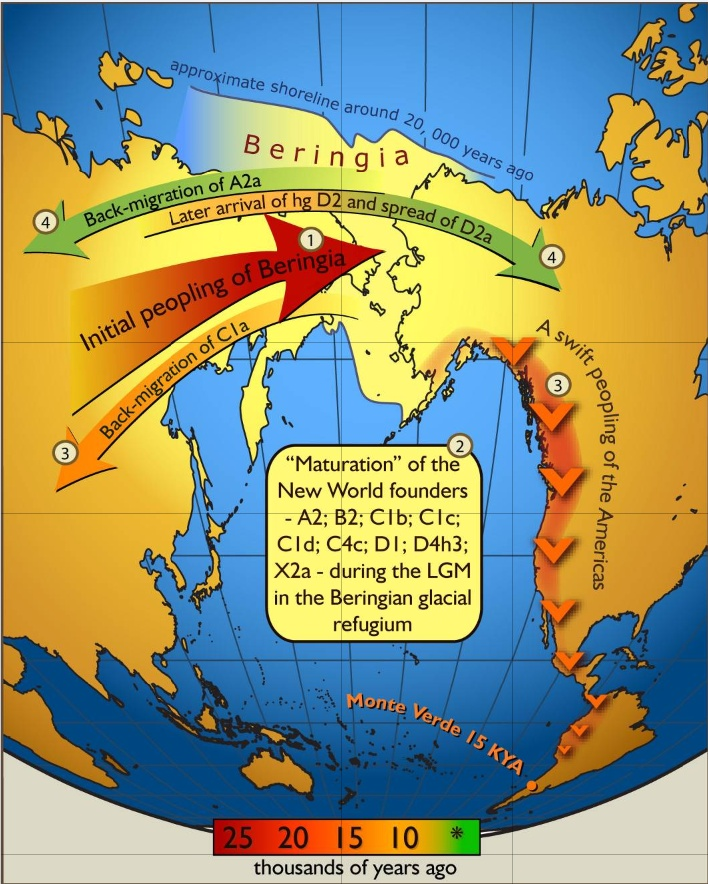
Schematic illustration of the Beringia migration based on matrilineal genetics: Arrival of Central Asian populations to the Beringian Mammoth steppe c. 25,000 years ago, followed by a "swift peopling of the Americas" c. 15,000 years ago.

Around 20,000 years ago, approximately 5,000 years after the Neanderthal extinction, the Last Glacial Maximum forced northern hemisphere inhabitants to migrate to several shelters (refugia) until the end of this period. The resulting populations are presumed to have resided in such refuges during the LGM to ultimately reoccupy Europe, where archaic historical populations are considered their descendants. The composition of European populations was later altered by further migrations, notably the Neolithic expansion from the Middle East, and still later the Chalcolithic population movements associated with Indo-European expansion, as well as admixture with diverse populations from North Africa. A Paleolithic site on the Yana River, Siberia, at 71°N, lies well above the Arctic Circle and dates to 27,000 radiocarbon years before present, during glacial times. This site shows that people adapted to this harsh, high-latitude, Late Pleistocene environment much earlier than previously thought.

==== Americas ====
Paleo-Indians originated from Central Asia, crossing the Beringia land bridge between eastern Siberia and present-day Alaska. Humans lived throughout the Americas by the end of the last glacial period, or more specifically what is known as the late glacial maximum. Details of Paleo-Indian migration to and throughout the American continent, including the dates and the routes traveled, are subject to ongoing research and discussion.

Conventional estimates have it that humans reached North America at some point between 15,000 and 20,000 years ago. The traditional theory is that these early migrants moved when sea levels were significantly lowered due to the Quaternary glaciation, following herds of now-extinct pleistocene megafauna along ice-free corridors that stretched between the Laurentide and Cordilleran ice sheets. Another route proposed is that, either on foot or using primitive boats, they migrated down the Pacific coast to South America as far as Chile. Any archaeological evidence of coastal occupation during the last Ice Age would now have been covered by the sea level rise, up to a hundred metres since then. The recent finding of indigenous Australasian genetic markers in Amazonia supports that a coastal route and subsequent isolation did occur with some migrants.

=== Holocene migrations ===
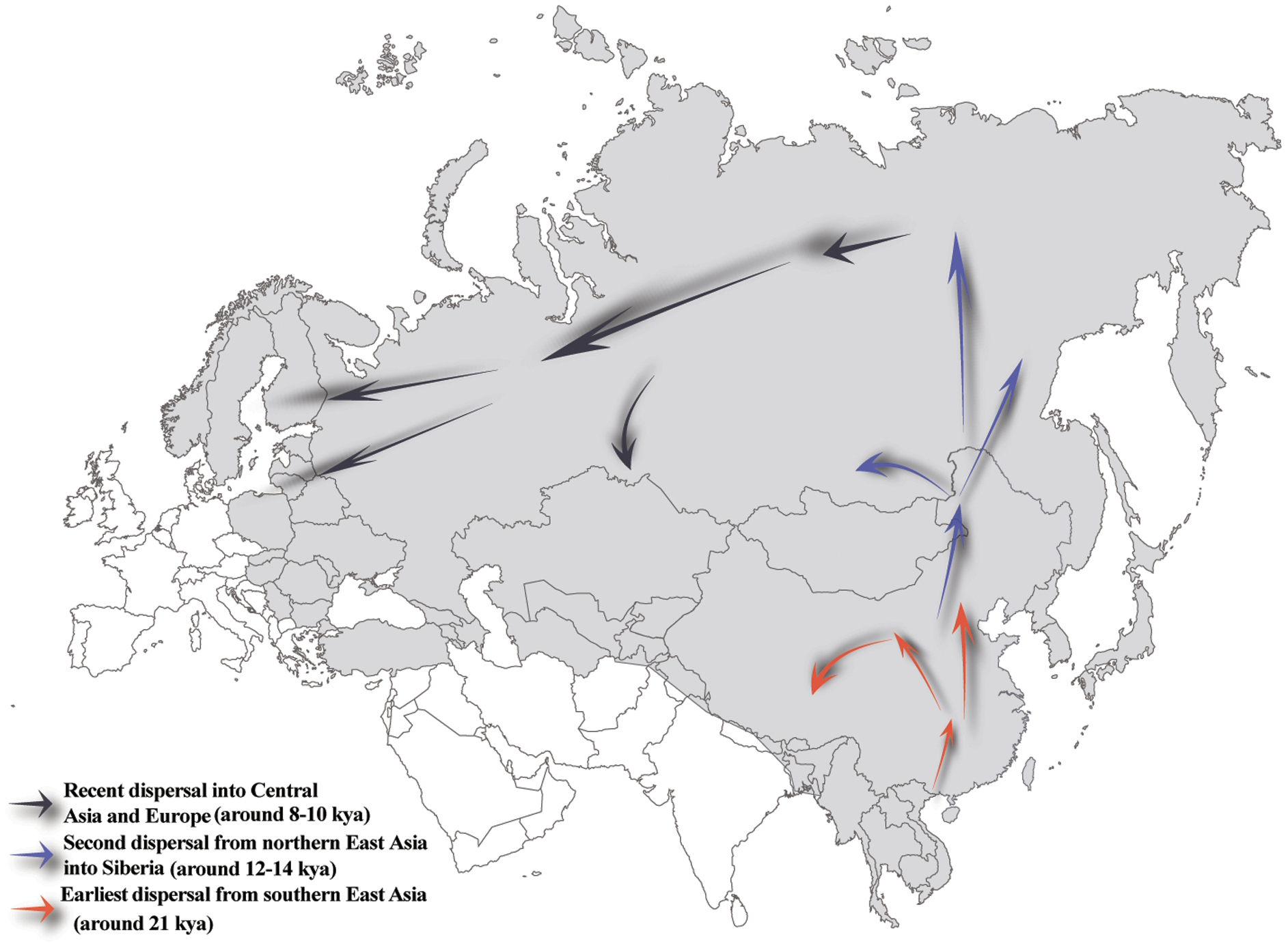
Prehistoric migration routes for Y-chromosome Haplogroup N lineage following the retreat of ice sheets after the Last Glacial Maximum (22–18 kya).

The Holocene is taken to begin 12,000 years ago, after the end of the Last Glacial Maximum. During the Holocene climatic optimum, beginning about 9,000 years ago, human populations which had been geographically confined to refugia began to migrate. By this time, most parts of the globe had been settled by H. sapiens; however, large areas that had been covered by glaciers were now re-populated.

This period sees the transition from the Mesolithic to the Neolithic stage throughout the temperate zone. The Neolithic subsequently gives way to the Bronze Age in Old World cultures and the gradual emergence of the historical record in the Near East and China beginning around 4,000 years ago.

Large-scale migrations of the Mesolithic to Neolithic era are thought to have given rise to the pre-modern distribution of the world's major language families such as the Niger-Congo, Nilo-Saharan, Afro-Asiatic, Uralic, Sino-Tibetan or Indo-European phyla. The speculative Nostratic theory postulates the derivation of the major language families of Eurasia (excluding Sino-Tibetan) from a single proto-language spoken at the beginning of the Holocene period.

==== Eurasia ====
Evidence published in 2014 from genome analysis of ancient human remains suggests that the modern native populations of Europe largely descend from three distinct lineages: "Western Hunter-Gatherers", derivative of the Cro-Magnon population of Europe, Early European Farmers introduced to Europe from the Near East during the Neolithic Revolution and Ancient North Eurasians who expanded to Europe in the context of the Indo-European expansion. The Ancient North Eurasian component was introduced to Western Europe by people related to the Yamnaya culture. Additional ANE ancestry is found in European populations through Paleolithic interactions with Eastern Hunter-Gatherers.

==== Sub-Saharan Africa ====
West-Eurasian back-migrations started in the early Holocene or already earlier in the Paleolithic period (30-15kya), followed by pre-Neolithic and Neolithic migration events from the Middle East, mostly affecting Northern Africa, the Horn of Africa, and wider regions of the Sahel zone and East Africa.

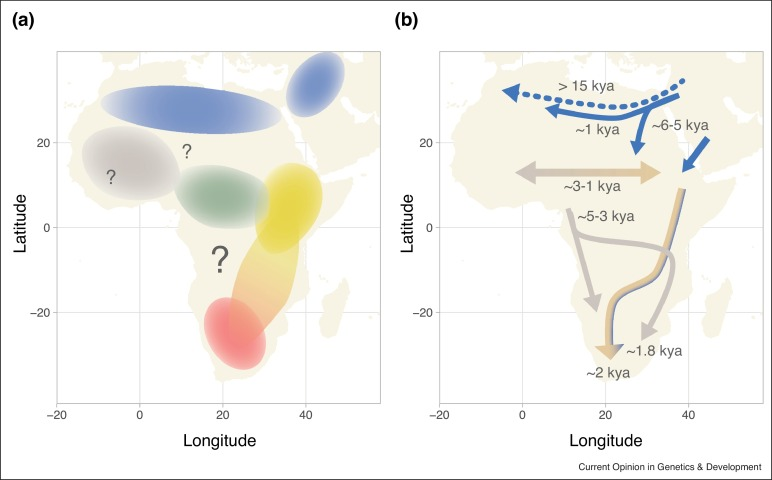
Pre-Neolithic and Neolithic migration events in Africa.

The Nilotic peoples are thought to be derived from an earlier undifferentiated Eastern Sudanic unity by the 3rd millennium BCE. The development of the Proto-Nilotes as a group may have been connected with their domestication of livestock. The Eastern Sudanic unity must have been considerably earlier still, perhaps around the 5th millennium BCE (while the proposed Nilo-Saharan unity would date to the Upper Paleolithic about 15kya). The original locus of the early Nilotic speakers was presumably east of the Nile in what is now South Sudan. The Proto-Nilotes of the 3rd millennium BCE were pastoralists, while their neighbors, the Proto-Central Sudanic peoples, were mostly agriculturalists.

The Niger-Congo phylum is thought to have emerged around 6,000 years ago in West or Central Africa. Its expansion may have been associated with the expansion of Sahel agriculture in the African Neolithic period, following the desiccation of the Sahara in c. 3900 BCE. The Bantu expansion has spread the Bantu languages to Central, Eastern and Southern Africa, partly replacing the indigenous populations of these regions, including the African Pygmies, Hadza people and San people. Beginning about 3,000 years ago, it reached South Africa about 1,700 years ago.

Some evidence (including a 2016 study by Busby et al.) suggests admixture from ancient and recent migrations from Eurasia into parts of Sub-Saharan Africa. Another study (Ramsay et al. 2018) also shows evidence that ancient Eurasians migrated into Africa and that Eurasian admixture in modern Sub-Saharan Africans ranges from 0% to 50%, varying by region and generally higher in the Horn of Africa and parts of the Sahel zone, and found to a lesser degree in certain parts of Western Africa, and Southern Africa (excluding recent immigrants).

==== Indo-Pacific ====
Chronological map of the Austronesian expansion.

The first seaborne human migrations were by the Austronesian peoples originating from Taiwan known as the "Austronesian expansion". Using advanced sailing technologies like catamarans, outrigger boats, and crab claw sails, they built the first sea-going ships and rapidly colonized Island Southeast Asia at around 3000 to 1500 BCE. From the Philippines and Eastern Indonesia they colonized Micronesia by 2200 to 1000 BCE.

A branch of the Austronesians reached Island Melanesia between 1600 and 1000 BCE, establishing the Lapita culture (named after the archaeological site in Lapita, New Caledonia, where their characteristic pottery was first discovered). They are the direct ancestors of the modern Polynesians. They ventured into Remote Oceania reaching Vanuatu, New Caledonia, and Fiji by 1200 BCE, and Samoa and Tonga by around 900 to 800 BCE. This was the furthest extent of the Lapita culture expansion. During a period of around 1,500 years, they gradually lost the technology for pottery (likely due to the lack of clay deposits in the islands), replacing it with carved wooden and bamboo containers. Back-migrations from the Lapita culture also merged back Island Southeast Asia in 1500 BCE, and into Micronesia at around 200 BCE. It was not until 700 CE when they started voyaging further into the Pacific Ocean, when they colonized the Cook Islands, the Society Islands, and the Marquesas. From there, they further colonized Hawaii by 900 CE, Rapa Nui by 1000 CE, and New Zealand by 1200 CE.

In the Indian Ocean, Austronesians from Borneo also colonized Madagascar and the Comoros Islands by around 500 CE. Austronesians remain the dominant ethnolinguistic group of the islands of the Indo-Pacific, and were the first to establish a maritime trade network reaching as far west as East Africa and the Arabian Peninsula. They assimilated earlier Pleistocene to early Holocene human overland migrations through Sundaland like the Papuans and the Negritos in Island Southeast Asia. The Austronesian expansion was the last and the most far-reaching Neolithic human migration event.

==== Caribbean ====
The Caribbean was one of the last places in the Americas that were settled by humans. The oldest remains are known from the Greater Antilles (Cuba and Hispaniola) dating between 4000 and 3500 BCE, and comparisons between tool-technologies suggest that these peoples moved across the Yucatán Channel from Central America. All evidence suggests that later migrants from 2000 BCE and onwards originated from South America, via the Orinoco region. The descendants of these migrants include the ancestors of the Taíno and Kalinago (Island Carib) peoples.

==== Arctic ====
Map showing the decline of the Paleo-Eskimo Dorset culture and expansion of the Thule people (900 to 1500 CE).

The earliest inhabitants of North America's central and eastern Arctic are referred to as the Arctic small tool tradition (AST) and existed c. 2500 BCE. AST consisted of several Paleo-Eskimo cultures, including the Independence cultures and Pre-Dorset culture.

The Inuit are the descendants of the Thule culture, which emerged from western Alaska around CE 1000 and gradually displaced the Dorset culture.

== See also ==
- Colonisation (biology)
- List of first human settlements
- Middle Paleolithic
- Quaternary extinction event
- Timeline of human evolution
- Timeline of maritime migration and exploration
