= Misliya Cave =

Prehistoric cave in Mount Carmel, Israel

- מערת מיסליה (Hebrew) (Hebrew)
- Brotzen Cave
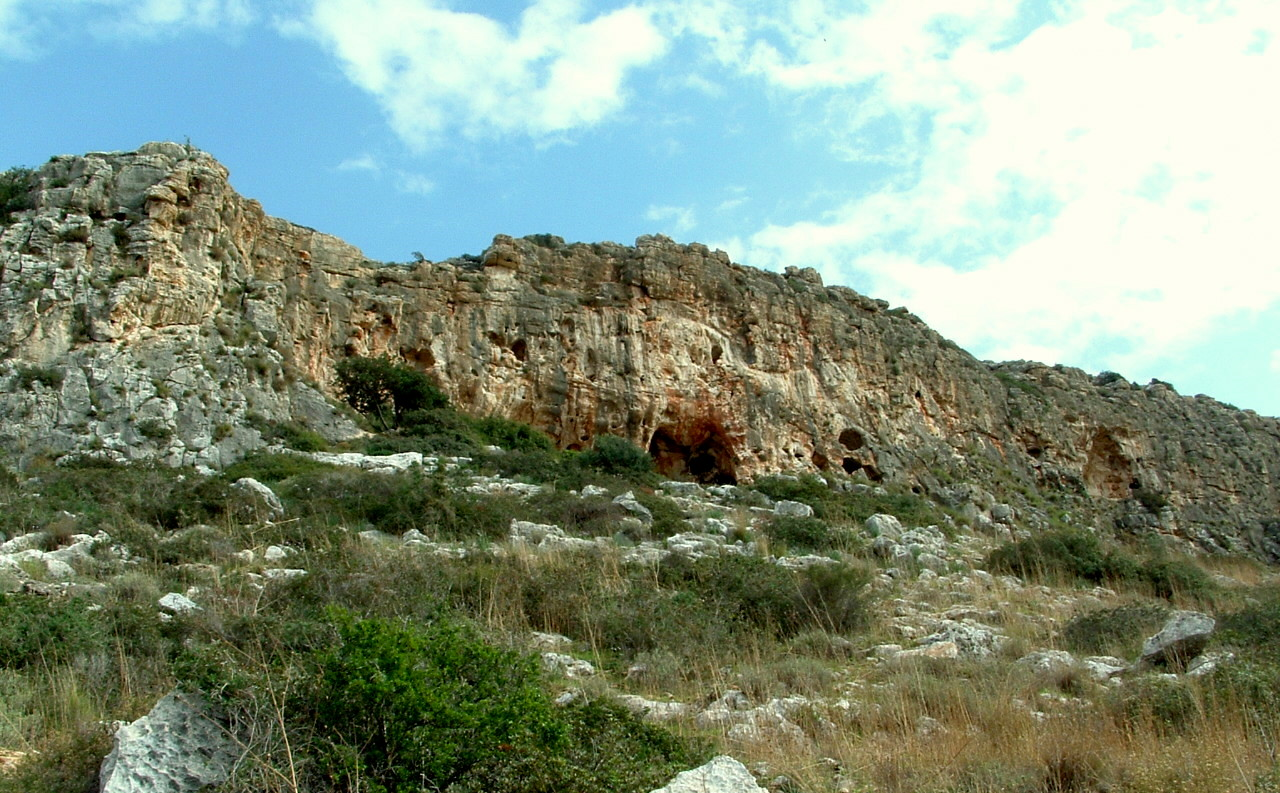

- Location within Haifa region of Israel
- 32.7413°N 34.9724°E
- Periods: Paleolithic
- Cultures: Acheulean; Acheulo-Yabrudian complex; Mousterian
- Location: Mount Carmel, Israel
- Region: Levant

Site notes
- Length: 80 m (262 ft)

Misliya Cave (Hebrew: מערת מיסליה), also known as the "Brotzen Cave" after Fritz Brotzen, who first described it in 1927, is a collapsed cave at Mount Carmel, Israel, containing archaeological layers from the Lower Paleolithic and Middle Paleolithic periods. The site is significant in paleoanthropology for the discovery of the second-oldest (after Apidima Cave in Greece) known remains attributed to Homo sapiens outside Africa, dated to 185,000 years ago.

== Excavations ==
Excavations by teams of University of Haifa and University of Tel Aviv were conducted in the 2000/1 season, yielding finds dated to between 300,000 and 150,000 years ago.

=== Misliya-1 fossil ===
Of special interest is the Misliya-1 fossil, an upper jawbone discovered in 2002, and at first dated to "possibly 150,000 years ago" and classified as "early modern Homo sapiens" (EMHS). In January 2018, the date of the fossil has been revised to between 177,000 and 194,000 years ago (95% CI). This qualifies Misliya-1 as one of the oldest known fossil of H. sapiens, of comparable age to the Omo remains (as well as those of Herto, identified as "archaic Homo sapiens", or Homo sapiens idaltu), and the second oldest modern humans ever found outside of Africa, the oldest being the skull Apidima 1 from the south western Peloponnese dated to roughly 210,000 years ago.

Prior to the discoveries of Misliya and Apidima, Jebel Faya in the United Arab Emirates had been considered to be the oldest settlement of anatomically-modern humans outside Africa, with its deepest assemblage being dated to 125,000 years ago.

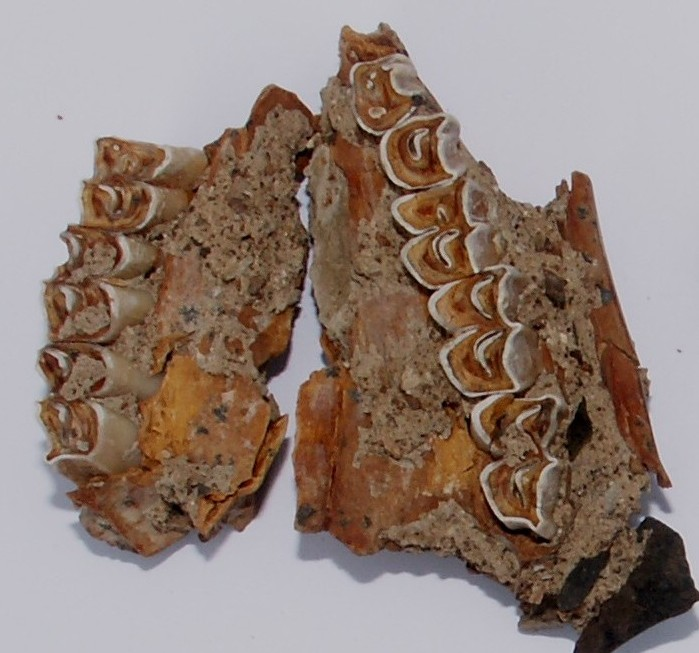
Gazelle upper jaw from Misliya Cave (early Middle Paleolithic)

== See also ==
- List of human evolution fossils
- Prehistory of the Levant
- Skhul Cave
