= Apidima Cave =

Archaeological site in Greece

- Location within Greece Location within Peloponnese
- Location: On western Mani Peninsula, west of Areopoli, southern Greece
- Coordinates: 36°39′41″N 22°21′48″E
- Geology: Karstic cave in limestone cliffside
- Entrances: 5
- Entrances list: A, B, C, D, E
- Access: Only by boat
- Website: fhw.gr/chronos/01/en/pl/housing/apidima.html

Apidima Cave (Greek: Σπήλαιο Απήδημα, Spilaio Apidima) is a complex of five caves located on the western shore of Mani Peninsula in southern Greece. The partial crania of two hominins are attributed by one research group to early Homo, before the full separation of Neanderthals and the anatomically-modern humans. Other researchers identify the older specimen, some 210,000 years old, as Homo sapiens and therefore the oldest anatomically-modern human discovered in Europe.

== Description ==
The Apidima Cave complex consists of five (previously reported as four) karstic caves in the limestone cliffside on the west shore of the Mani Peninsula in southern Greece. Today the caves open on the face of a large sea cliff and are accessible only by boat, but during the ice ages the sea level went lower by more than 100 m (330 ft), and several seashore caves around the world, today submerged or situated at the wave zone—Apidima Cave belonging to the latter category—rose well above the water surface and were occupied by early people.

The complex consists of four small caves, designated "A", "B", "C" and "D". It was formed by erosion within the Middle Triassic to Late Eocene limestone of depth 500 m (1,600 ft), from 4–24 m (13–79 ft) above sea level, in a vertical zone of depth 20 m (66 ft). The development of the caves is due to the vertical strikes of the limestone, while the horizontal opening is made by the sea.

== Archaeology ==
=== Research programme ===
The scientific research programme at Apidima began in 1978 and is being conducted by the National Archaeological Museum of Greece in collaboration with the Laboratory of Historical Geology-Palaeontology of Athens University, the Institute of Geology and Mineral Exploitation and the Aristotle University of Thessaloniki.

=== Findings ===
Approximately 20,000 bones, bone fragments, and teeth from various fauna have been collected since 1978 from this site by Theodore Pitsios and his team. There are a few animal specimens with probable traces of butchering. The two Homo fossils were excavated from the thick and cohesive breccia 4 m (13 ft) above sea level.

In addition to fossils, researchers located several tools, including handaxes and tools produced from local flint, along the perimeters of poljes at the Kokkinopilos and Alonaki locations. Evidence of fire use was also found. As of 1999, Theodore Pitsios, a professor of physical anthropology and faculty member of medicine at the National and Kapodistrian University of Athens, estimated that over 30 thousand fossils had been collected from Apidima Cave. Of these, two are hominin crania imbedded in breccia rock in different layers of stratigraphy.

=== Homo fossils ===
Researchers uncovered two significant fossils in Apidima Cave "A" in 1978. The two fossils are now referred to as Apidima 1 and Apidima 2. Stone tools were found in all four caves. Research published in July 2019 indicates that the Apidima 2 skull fragment (designated LAO 1/S2) has Neanderthal morphology, and using uranium-thorium dating, was found to be more than 170,000 years old. The Apidima 1 skull fossil (designated LAO 1/S1) was found to be older, dated—using the same method—to more than 210,000 years old.

==== Apidima I ====
Apidima I consists of the posterior portion of a cranium, which shows signs of erosion. In 2019 Harvati et al. proposed that Apidima 1 is the earliest European example of an anatomically-modern human. If so, Apidima 1 would be the oldest evidence of Homo sapiens outside Africa, more than 150,000 years older than other H. sapiens finds in Europe. The oldest generally-accepted anatomically-modern human outside Africa is a maxilla from Misliya Cave in Mount Carmel, Palestine, with a maximum age of about 190,000 years ago.

==== Apidima II ====
The second cranium, labeled Apidima 2 and dated more than 150 thousand years ago, is more obviously related to Neanderthals, including a large and continuous brow ridge. The fossilized cranium appeared to have multiple fractures, as well as distortion of the left side of the skull, suggestive of sediment pressure after deposition. Apidima 2 has been analyzed by CT scan in which the cranium was virtually reconstructed, eliminating fractures and distortion.

=== Identification as Homo erectus ===
In 2020 de Lumley et al. concluded that the anatomical features of both skulls can be attributed to the group of evolved European Homo erectus hominins, with some early Neanderthal features, similar to the skulls of Sima de los Huesos, Swanscombe Man, Biache-Saint-Vaast and Grotte du Lazaret, but they can be differentiated from the classical Neanderthals.

=== Animal fossil findings ===
Fossils of rhinoceros, elephant, deer, and caprids have been found at the Kalamakia site, north of Apidima. The deer and caprids are considered to have been food items. At Apidima, Caves B and C held fossils of leopard (Panthera pardus) and European Badger (Meles meles), whereas Caves C and D contained fossils from multiple lynx (Lynx lynx). Cave C also provided fossil remains of the European Wildcat species (Felis silvestris) and red fox (Vulpes vulpes), as well as remains of the beech marten (Martes foina).

== See also ==
- Early human migrations
- List of human evolution fossils
- Misliya cave
- Prehistory of Southeastern Europe
