= Early modern human =

Old Stone Age Homo sapiens

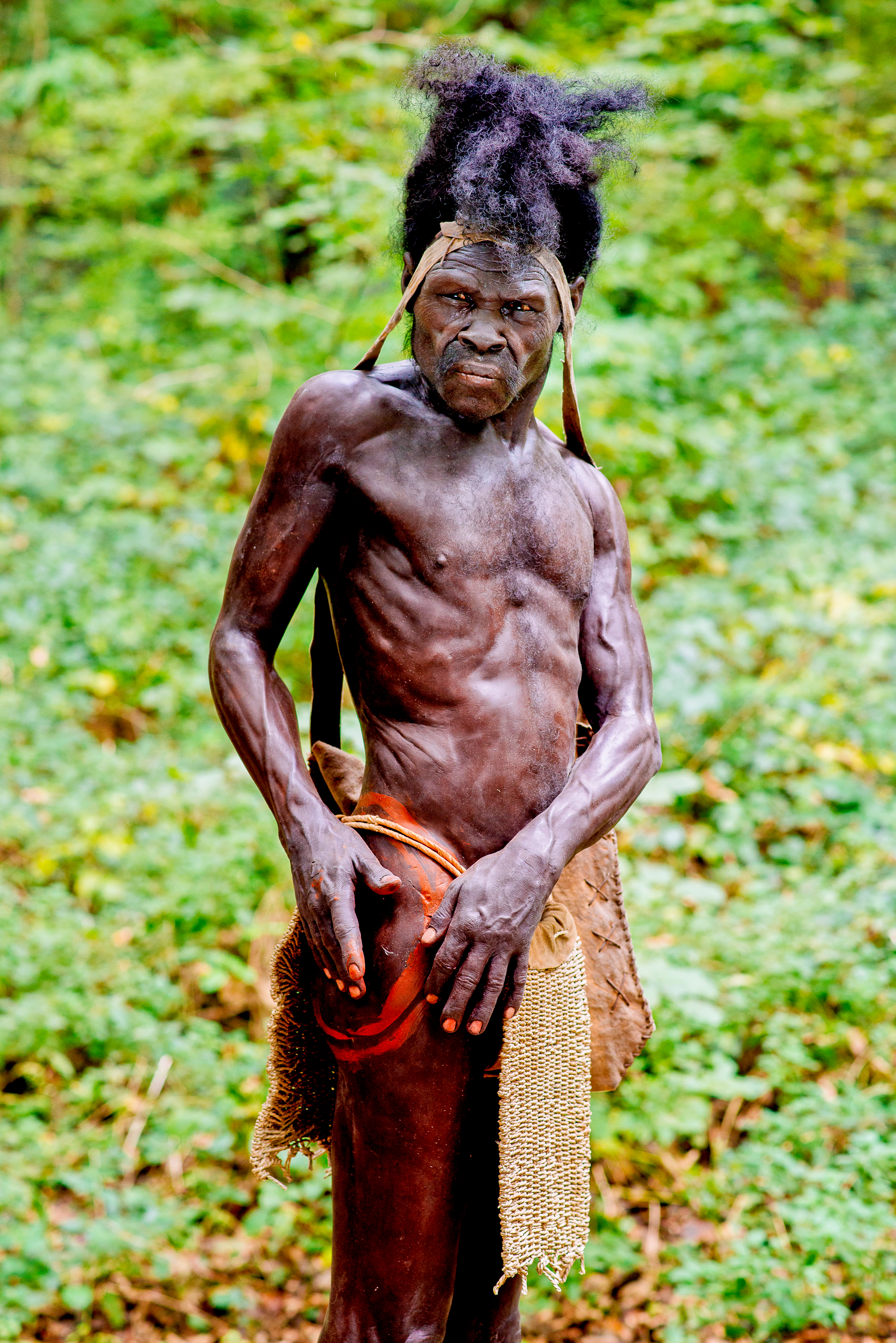
Reconstruction of early Homo sapiens from Jebel Irhoud, Morocco, c. 315,000 years BP

Early modern human, or anatomically modern human, are terms used to distinguish Homo sapiens (the only extant Hominina species) that are anatomically consistent with the range of phenotypes seen in contemporary humans, from extinct archaic human species. This distinction is useful especially for times and regions where anatomically modern and archaic humans co-existed, for example, in Paleolithic Europe. Among the oldest known remains of Homo sapiens are those found at the Omo-Kibish I archaeological site in south-western Ethiopia, dating to about 233,000 to 196,000 years ago, the Florisbad Skull found at the Florisbad archaeological and paleontological site in South Africa, dating to about 259,000 years ago, and the Jebel Irhoud site in Morocco, dated about 315,000 years ago.

Extinct species of the genus Homo include Homo erectus (extant from roughly 2,000,000 to 100,000 years ago) and a number of other species (by some authors considered subspecies of either H. sapiens or H. erectus). The divergence of the lineage leading to H. sapiens out of ancestral H. erectus (or an intermediate species such as Homo antecessor) is estimated to have occurred in Africa roughly 500,000 years ago. The earliest fossil evidence of early modern humans appears in Africa around 300,000 years ago, with the earliest genetic splits among modern people, according to some evidence, dating to around the same time. (Note: Based on Schlebusch et al., "Southern African ancient genomes estimate modern human divergence to 350,000 to 260,000 years ago", Fig. 3 (H. sapiens divergence times) and Stringer (2012), (archaic admixture).) Sustained archaic human admixture with modern humans is known to have taken place both in Africa and (following the recent Out-Of-Africa expansion) in Eurasia, between about 100,000 and 30,000 years ago.

== Name and taxonomy ==
Hominin timeline
← / Earlier apes; ← / Gorilla split; ← / Chimpanzee split; ← / Earliest bipedal; ← / Earliest sign of Ardipithecus; ← / Earliest sign of Australopithecus; ← / Earliest stone tools; ← / Earliest sign of Homo; ← / Dispersal beyond Africa; ← / Earliest fire / cooking; ← / Earliest rock art; ← / Earliest clothes; ← / Modern humans
(million years ago)

The binomial name Homo sapiens was coined by Linnaeus, 1758. The Latin noun homō (genitive hominis) means "human being", while the participle sapiēns means "discerning, wise, sensible", or taken together essentially "intelligent human".

The species was initially thought to have emerged from a predecessor within the genus Homo around 300,000 to 200,000 years ago. (Note: This is a matter of convention (rather than a factual dispute), and there is no universal consensus on terminology. Some scholars include humans of up to 600,000 years ago under the same species. See Bryant (2003), p. 811. See also Tattersall (2012), Page 82 (cf. Unfortunately this consensus in principle hardly clarifies matters much in practice. For there is no agreement on what the 'qualities of a man' actually are," [...]).) A problem with the morphological classification of "anatomically modern" was that it would not have included certain extant populations. For this reason, a lineage-based (cladistic) definition of H. sapiens has been suggested, in which H. sapiens would by definition refer to the modern human lineage following the split from the Neanderthal lineage. Such a cladistic definition would extend the age of H. sapiens to over 500,000 years. (Note: Werdelin citing Lieberman et al.)

Estimates for the split between the Homo sapiens line and combined Neanderthal/Denisovan line range from between 503,000 and 565,000 years ago; between 550,000 and 765,000 years ago; and (based on rates of dental evolution) possibly more than 800,000 years ago.

Extant human populations have historically been divided into subspecies, but since around the 1980s, the consensus has been to subsume all extant groups into a single species, H. sapiens, avoiding division into subspecies altogether. (Note: The history of claimed or proposed subspecies of H. sapiens is complicated and fraught with controversy. The only widely recognized archaic subspecies is H. sapiens idaltu (2003). The name H. s. sapiens is due to Linnaeus (1758), and refers by definition the subspecies of which Linnaeus himself is the type specimen. However, Linnaeus postulated four other extant subspecies, viz. H. s. afer, H. s. americanus, H. s. asiaticus and H. s. ferus for Africans, Americans, Asians, and the Malay. This classification remained in common usage until the mid 20th century, sometimes alongside H. s. tasmanianus for Australians. See, for example, Bailey, 1946; Hall, 1946. The division of extant human populations into taxonomic subspecies was gradually given up in the 1970s (for example, Grzimek's Animal Life Encyclopedia).)

Some sources show Neanderthals (H. neanderthalensis) as a subspecies (H. sapiens neanderthalensis). Similarly, the discovered specimens of the H. rhodesiensis species have been classified by some as a subspecies (H. sapiens rhodesiensis), although it remains more common to treat these last two as separate species within the genus Homo rather than as subspecies within H. sapiens.

All humans are considered to be a part of the subspecies H. sapiens sapiens, a designation which has been a matter of debate since a species is usually not given a subspecies category unless there is evidence of multiple distinct subspecies.

== Age and speciation process ==
=== Derivation from H. erectus ===
The divergence of the lineage that would lead to H. sapiens out of archaic human varieties derived from H. erectus, is estimated as having taken place over 500,000 years ago (marking the split of the H. sapiens lineage from ancestors shared with other known archaic hominins). But the oldest split among modern human populations (such as the Khoisan split from other groups) has been recently dated to between 350,000 and 260,000 years ago, and the earliest known examples of H. sapiens fossils also date to about that period, including the Jebel Irhoud remains from Morocco (ca. 300,000 or 350–280,000 years ago), the Florisbad Skull from South Africa (ca. 259,000 years ago), and the Omo remains from Ethiopia (ca. 195,000, or, as more recently dated, ca. 233,000 years ago).

An mtDNA study in 2019 proposed an origin of modern humans in Botswana (and a Khoisan split) of around 200,000 years. However, this proposal has been widely criticized by scholars, with the recent evidence overall (genetic, fossil, and archaeological) supporting an origin for H. sapiens approximately 100,000 years earlier and in a broader region of Africa than the study proposes.

In September 2019, scientists proposed that the earliest H. sapiens (and last common human ancestor to modern humans) arose between 350,000 and 260,000 years ago through a merging of populations in East and South Africa.

An alternative suggestion defines H. sapiens cladistically as including the lineage of modern humans since the split from the lineage of Neanderthals, roughly 500,000 to 800,000 years ago.

The time of divergence between archaic H. sapiens and ancestors of Neanderthals and Denisovans caused by a genetic bottleneck of the latter was dated at 744,000 years ago, combined with repeated early admixture events and Denisovans diverging from Neanderthals 300 generations after their split from H. sapiens, as calculated by Rogers et al. (2017).

The derivation of a comparatively homogeneous single species of H. sapiens from more diverse varieties of archaic humans (all of which were descended from the early dispersal of H. erectus some 1.8 million years ago) was debated in terms of two competing models during the 1980s: "recent African origin" postulated the emergence of H. sapiens from a single source population in Africa, which expanded and led to the extinction of all other human varieties, while the "multiregional evolution" model postulated the survival of regional forms of archaic humans, gradually converging into the modern human varieties by the mechanism of clinal variation, via genetic drift, gene flow and selection throughout the Pleistocene.

Since the 2000s, the availability of data from archaeogenetics and population genetics has led to the emergence of a much more detailed picture, intermediate between the two competing scenarios outlined above: The recent Out-of-Africa expansion accounts for the predominant part of modern human ancestry, while there were also significant admixture events with regional archaic humans.

Since the 1970s, the Omo remains, originally dated to some 195,000 years ago, have often been taken as the conventional cut-off point for the emergence of "anatomically modern humans". Since the 2000s, the discovery of older remains with comparable characteristics, and the discovery of ongoing hybridization between "modern" and "archaic" populations after the time of the Omo remains, have opened up a renewed debate on the age of H. sapiens in journalistic publications. H. s. idaltu, dated to 160,000 years ago, has been postulated as an extinct subspecies of H. sapiens in 2003. H. neanderthalensis, which became extinct about 40,000 years ago, was also at one point considered to be a subspecies, H. s. neanderthalensis.

H. heidelbergensis, dated 600,000 to 300,000 years ago, has long been thought to be a likely candidate for the last common ancestor of the Neanderthal and modern human lineages. However, genetic evidence from the Sima de los Huesos fossils published in 2016 seems to suggest that H. heidelbergensis in its entirety should be included in the Neanderthal lineage, as "pre-Neanderthal" or "early Neanderthal", while the divergence time between the Neanderthal and modern lineages has been pushed back to before the emergence of H. heidelbergensis, to close to 800,000 years ago, the approximate time of disappearance of H. antecessor.

=== Early Homo sapiens ===
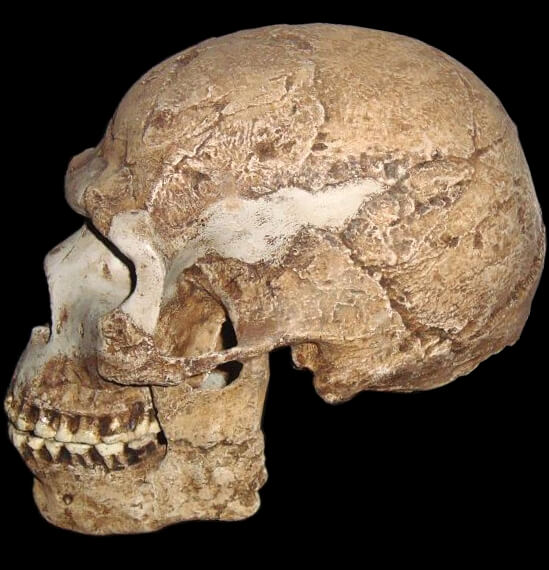
100 to 80 thousand year old Skhul V from Israel

The term Middle Paleolithic is intended to cover the time between the first emergence of H. sapiens (roughly 300,000 years ago) and the period held by some to mark the emergence of full behavioral modernity (roughly by 50,000 years ago, corresponding to the start of the Upper Paleolithic).

Many of the early modern human finds, like those of Jebel Irhoud, Omo, Herto, Florisbad, Skhul, and Peștera cu Oase, exhibit a mix of archaic and modern traits. Skhul V, for example, has prominent brow ridges and a projecting face. However, the brain case is quite rounded and distinct from that of the Neanderthals and is similar to the brain case of modern humans. It is uncertain whether the robust traits of some of the early modern humans like Skhul V reflects mixed ancestry or retention of older traits.

The "gracile" or lightly built skeleton of anatomically modern humans has been connected to a change in behavior, including increased cooperation and "resource transport".

There is evidence that the characteristic human brain development, especially the prefrontal cortex, was due to "an exceptional acceleration of metabolome evolution ... paralleled by a drastic reduction in muscle strength. The observed rapid metabolic changes in brain and muscle, together with the unique human cognitive skills and low muscle performance, might reflect parallel mechanisms in human evolution." The Schöningen spears and their correlation of finds are evidence that complex technological skills already existed 300,000 years ago, and are the first obvious proof of an active (big game) hunt. H. heidelbergensis already had intellectual and cognitive skills like anticipatory planning, thinking and acting that so far have only been attributed to modern humans.

The ongoing admixture events within anatomically modern human populations make it difficult to estimate the age of the matrilinear and patrilinear most recent common ancestors of modern populations (Mitochondrial Eve and Y-chromosomal Adam). Estimates of the age of Y-chromosomal Adam have been pushed back significantly with the discovery of an ancient Y-chromosomal lineage in 2013, to likely beyond 300,000 years ago. (Note: (95% confidence interval 237–581 kya)) There have, however, been no reports of the survival of Y-chromosomal or mitochondrial DNA clearly deriving from archaic humans (which would push back the age of the most recent patrilinear or matrilinear ancestor beyond 500,000 years).

Fossil teeth found at Qesem Cave (Israel) and dated to between 400,000 and 200,000 years ago have been compared to the dental material from the younger (120,000–80,000 years ago) Skhul and Qafzeh hominins. (Note: "Although none of the Qesem teeth shows a suite of Neanderthal characters, a few traits may suggest some affinities with members of the Neanderthal evolutionary lineage. However, the balance of the evidence suggests a closer similarity with the Skhul/Qafzeh dental material, although many of these resemblances likely represent plesiomorphous features.")

== Dispersal and archaic admixture ==
Dispersal of early H. sapiens began soon after its emergence, as evidenced by the North African Jebel Irhoud finds (dated to around 315,000 years ago). There is indirect evidence for H. sapiens presence in West Asia around 270,000 years ago.

The Florisbad Skull from Florisbad, South Africa, dated to about 259,000 years ago, has also been classified as representing early H. sapiens.Scerri (2018), pp. 582–594

In September 2019, scientists proposed that the earliest H. sapiens (and last common human ancestor to modern humans) arose between 350,000 and 260,000 years ago through a merging of populations in East and South Africa.

Among extant populations, the Khoi-San (or "Capoid") hunters-gatherers of Southern Africa may represent the human population with the earliest possible divergence within the group Homo sapiens sapiens. Their separation time has been estimated in a 2017 study to be between 350 and 260,000 years ago, compatible with the estimated age of early H. sapiens. The study states that the deep split-time estimation of 350 to 260 thousand years ago is consistent with the archaeological estimate for the onset of the Middle Stone Age across sub-Saharan Africa and coincides with archaic H. sapiens in southern Africa represented by, for example, the Florisbad skull dating to 259 (± 35) thousand years ago.

H. s. idaltu, found at Middle Awash in Ethiopia, lived about 160,000 years ago, and H. sapiens lived at Omo Kibish in Ethiopia about 233,000-195,000 years ago. Two fossils from Guomde, Kenya, dated to at least (and likely more than) 180,000 years ago and (more precisely) to 300–270,000 years ago, have been tentatively assigned to H. sapiens and similarities have been noted between them and the Omo Kibbish remains. Fossil evidence for modern human presence in West Asia is ascertained for 177,000 years ago, and disputed fossil evidence suggests expansion as far as East Asia by 120,000 years ago.

In July 2019, anthropologists reported the discovery of 210,000 year old remains of a H. sapiens in Apidima Cave, Peloponnese, Greece, more than 150,000 years older than previous H. sapiens finds in Europe. However, this specimen has been alternatively identified as an evolved European Homo erectus hominin, with some early Neanderthal features.

A significant dispersal event, within Africa and to West Asia, is associated with the African megadroughts during MIS 5, beginning 130,000 years ago. A 2011 study located the origin of basal population of contemporary human populations at 130,000 years ago, with the Khoi-San representing an "ancestral population cluster" located in southwestern Africa (near the coastal border of Namibia and Angola).

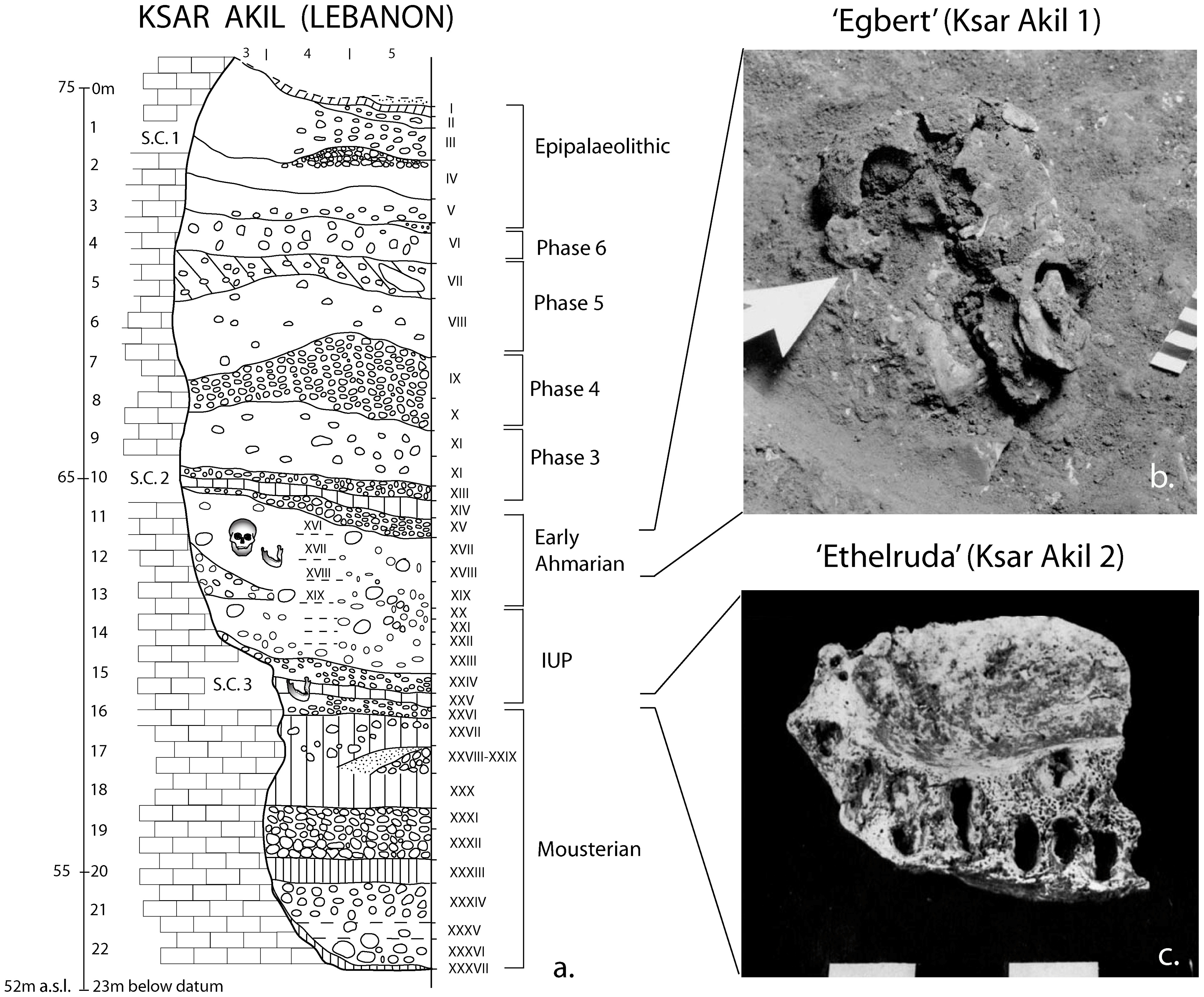
Layer sequence at Ksar Akil in the Levantine corridor, and discovery of two fossils of Homo sapiens, dated to 40,800 to 39,200 years BP for "Egbert", and 42,400–41,700 BP for "Ethelruda".

While early modern human expansion in Sub-Saharan Africa before 130 kya persisted, early expansion to North Africa and Asia appears to have mostly disappeared by the end of MIS5 (75,000 years ago), and is known only from fossil evidence and from archaic admixture. Eurasia was re-populated by early modern humans in the so-called "recent out-of-Africa migration" post-dating MIS5, beginning around 70,000–50,000 years ago. In this expansion, bearers of mt-DNA haplogroup L3 left East Africa, likely reaching Arabia via the Bab-el-Mandeb, and in the Great Coastal Migration spread to South Asia, Maritime South Asia and Oceania between 65,000 and 50,000 years ago, while Europe, East and North Asia were reached by about 45,000 years ago. Some evidence suggests that an early wave of humans may have reached the Americas by about 40,000–25,000 years ago.

Evidence for the overwhelming contribution of this "recent" (L3-derived) expansion to all non-African populations was established based on mitochondrial DNA, combined with evidence based on physical anthropology of archaic specimens, during the 1990s and 2000s, (Note: "Currently available genetic and archaeological evidence is generally interpreted as supportive of a recent single origin of modern humans in East Africa.") and has also been supported by Y DNA and autosomal DNA. The assumption of complete replacement has been revised in the 2010s with the discovery of admixture events (introgression) of populations of H. sapiens with populations of archaic humans over the period of between roughly 100,000 and 30,000 years ago, both in Eurasia and in Sub-Saharan Africa. Neanderthal admixture, in the range of 1–4%, is found in all modern populations outside of Africa, including in Europeans, Asians, Papua New Guineans, Australian Aboriginals, Native Americans, and other non-Africans. This suggests that interbreeding between Neanderthals and anatomically modern humans took place after the recent "out of Africa" migration, likely between 60,000 and 40,000 years ago. Recent admixture analyses have added to the complexity, finding that Eastern Neanderthals derive up to 2% of their ancestry from anatomically modern humans who left Africa some 100 kya. The extent of Neanderthal admixture (and introgression of genes acquired by admixture) varies significantly between contemporary racial groups, being absent in Africans, intermediate in Europeans and highest in East Asians. Certain genes related to UV-light adaptation introgressed from Neanderthals have been found to have been selected for in East Asians specifically from 45,000 years ago until around 5,000 years ago. The extent of archaic admixture is of the order of about 1% to 4% in Europeans and East Asians, and highest among Melanesians (the last also having Denisova hominin admixture at 4% to 6% in addition to neanderthal admixture). Cumulatively, about 20% of the Neanderthal genome is estimated to remain present spread in contemporary populations.

In September 2019, scientists reported the computerized determination, based on 260 CT scans, of a virtual skull shape of the last common human ancestor to modern humans/H. sapiens, representative of the earliest modern humans, and suggested that modern humans arose between 350,000 and 260,000 years ago through a merging of populations in East and South Africa while North-African fossils may represent a population which introgressed into Neandertals during the LMP.

According to a study published in 2020, there are indications that 2% to 19% (or about ≃6.6 and ≃7.0%) of the DNA of four West African populations may have come from an unknown archaic hominin which split from the ancestor of humans and Neanderthals between 360 kya to 1.02 mya.

== Anatomy ==
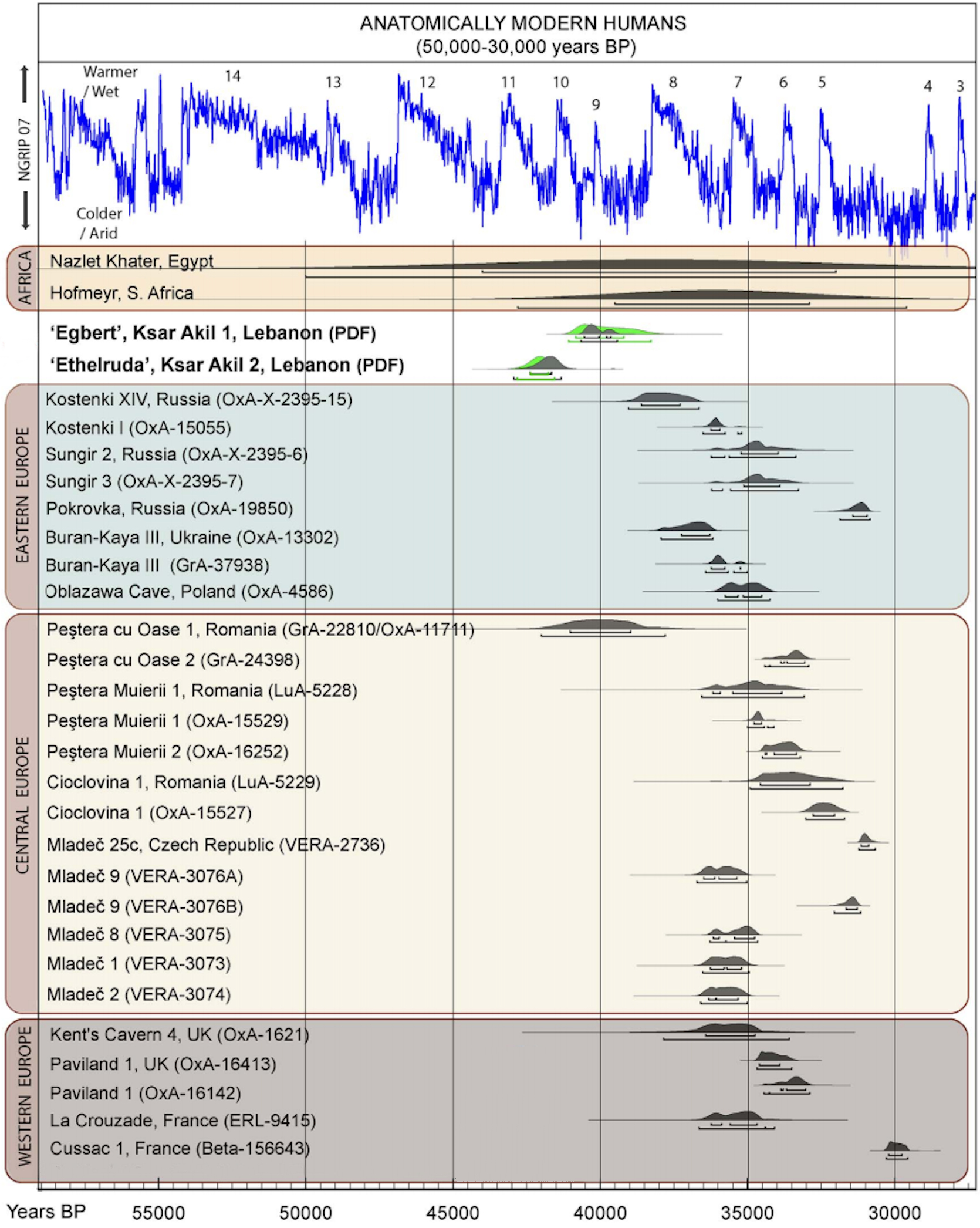
Known archaeological remains of anatomically modern humans in Europe and Africa, directly dated, calibrated carbon dates as of 2013.

Generally, modern humans are more lightly built (or more "gracile") than the more "robust" archaic humans. Nevertheless, contemporary humans exhibit high variability in many physiological traits, and may exhibit remarkable "robustness". There are still a number of physiological details which can be taken as reliably differentiating the physiology of Neanderthals vs. anatomically modern humans.

=== Anatomical modernity ===
The term "anatomically modern humans" is used with varying scope depending on context, to distinguish "anatomically modern" Homo sapiens from archaic humans such as Neanderthals and Middle and Lower Paleolithic hominins with transitional features intermediate between H. erectus, Neanderthals and early anatomically modern humans called archaic Homo sapiens. In a convention popular in the 1990s, Neanderthals were classified as a subspecies of H. sapiens, as H. s. neanderthalensis, while anatomically modern humans (or European early modern humans), was taken to refer to "Cro-Magnon" or H. s. sapiens. Under this nomenclature (Neanderthals considered H. sapiens), the term "anatomically modern Homo sapiens" has also been used to refer to European early modern humans ("Cro-Magnons"). It has since become more common to designate Neanderthals as a separate species, H. neanderthalensis, so that anatomically modern human in the European context refers to H. sapiens, but the question is by no means resolved. (Note: This is a question of conventional terminology, not one of a factual disagreement. Pääbo (2014) frames this as a debate that is unresolvable in principle, "since there is no definition of species perfectly describing the case.")

In this more narrow definition of H. sapiens, the subspecies Homo sapiens idaltu, discovered in 2003, also falls under the umbrella of "anatomically modern". The recognition of H. sapiens idaltu as a valid subspecies of the anatomically modern human lineage would justify the description of contemporary humans with the subspecies name Homo sapiens sapiens. However, biological anthropologist Chris Stringer does not consider idaltu distinct enough within H. sapiens to warrant its own subspecies designation.

A further division of anatomically modern human into "early" or "robust" vs. "post-glacial" or "gracile" subtypes has since been used for convenience. The emergence of "gracile anatomically modern human" is taken to reflect a process towards a smaller and more fine-boned skeleton beginning around 50,000–30,000 years ago.

=== Braincase anatomy ===
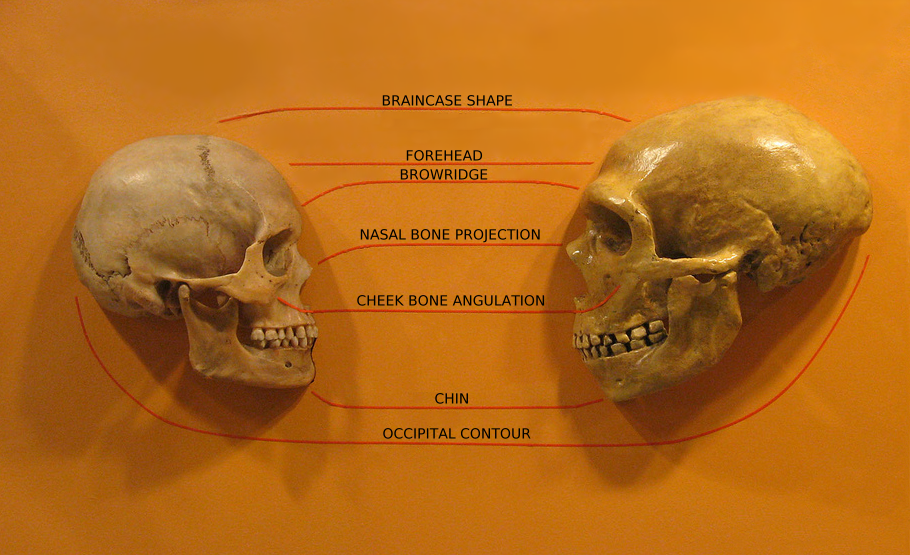
Anatomical comparison of skulls of H. sapiens (left) and H. neanderthalensis (right) (in Cleveland Museum of Natural History) Features compared are the braincase shape, forehead, browridge, nasal bone projection, cheek bone angulation, chin and occipital contour

The cranium lacks a pronounced occipital bun in the neck, a bulge that anchored considerable neck muscles in Neanderthals. Modern humans, even the earlier ones, generally have a larger fore-brain than the archaic people, so that the brain sits above rather than behind the eyes. This will usually (though not always) give a higher forehead, and reduced brow ridge. Early modern people and some living people do however have quite pronounced brow ridges, but they differ from those of archaic forms by having both a supraorbital foramen or notch, forming a groove through the ridge above each eye. This splits the ridge into a central part and two distal parts. In current humans, often only the central section of the ridge is preserved (if it is preserved at all). This contrasts with archaic humans, where the brow ridge is pronounced and unbroken.

Modern humans commonly have a steep, even vertical forehead whereas their predecessors had foreheads that sloped strongly backwards. According to Desmond Morris, the vertical forehead in humans plays an important role in human communication through eyebrow movements and forehead skin wrinkling.

Brain size in both Neanderthals and anatomically modern humans is significantly larger on average (but overlapping in range) than brain size in H. erectus. Neanderthal and anatomically modern human brain sizes are in the same range, but there are differences in the relative sizes of individual brain areas, with significantly larger visual systems in Neanderthals than in anatomically modern humans. (Note: Contemporary human endocranial volume averages at 1,350 cm^{3} (82 cu in), with significant differences between populations, global group means range 1,085–1,580 cm^{3} (66.2–96.4 cu in). Neanderthal average is close to 1,450 cm^{3} (88 cu in) (male average 1,600 cm^{3} (98 cu in), female average 1,300 cm^{3} (79 cu in)), with a range extending up to 1,736 cm^{3} (105.9 cu in) (Amud 1).)

=== Jaw anatomy ===
Compared to archaic people, anatomically modern humans have smaller, differently shaped teeth. This results in a smaller, more receded dentary, making the rest of the jaw-line stand out, giving an often quite prominent chin. The central part of the mandible forming the chin carries a triangularly shaped area forming the apex of the chin called the mental Trigon, not found in archaic humans. Particularly in living populations, the use of fire and tools requires fewer jaw muscles, giving slender, more gracile jaws. Compared to archaic people, modern humans have smaller, lower faces.

=== Body skeleton structure ===
The body skeletons of even the earliest and most robustly built modern humans were less robust than those of Neanderthals (and - from what little we know - from Denisovans), having essentially modern proportions. Particularly regarding the long bones of the limbs, the distal bones (the radius/ulna and tibia/fibula) are nearly the same size or slightly shorter than the proximal bones (the humerus and femur). In ancient people, particularly Neanderthals, the distal bones were shorter, usually thought to be an adaptation to cold climate. The same adaptation is found in some modern people living in the polar regions.

Height ranges overlap between Neanderthals and anatomically modern humans, with Neanderthal averages cited as 164 to 168 cm (65 to 66 in) and 152 to 156 cm (60 to 61 in) for males and females, respectively, which is largely identical to pre-industrial average heights for anatomically modern humans. (Note: "Based on 45 long bones from maximally 14 males and 7 females, Neanderthals' height averages between 164 and 168 (males) resp. 152 to 156 cm (females). This height is indeed 12–14 cm lower than the height of post-WWII Europeans, but compared to Europeans some 20,000 or 100 years ago, it is practically identical or even slightly higher.") Contemporary national averages range between 158 to 184 cm (62 to 72 in) in males and 147 to 172 cm (58 to 68 in) in females. Neanderthal ranges approximate the contemporary height distribution measured among Malay people, for one. (Note: Malay, 20–24 (N= m:749 f:893, Median= m:166 cm (5 ft 5 1/2 in) f:155 cm (5 ft 1 in), SD= m:6.46 cm (2 1/2 in) f:6.04 cm (2 1/2 in)))

== Recent evolution ==
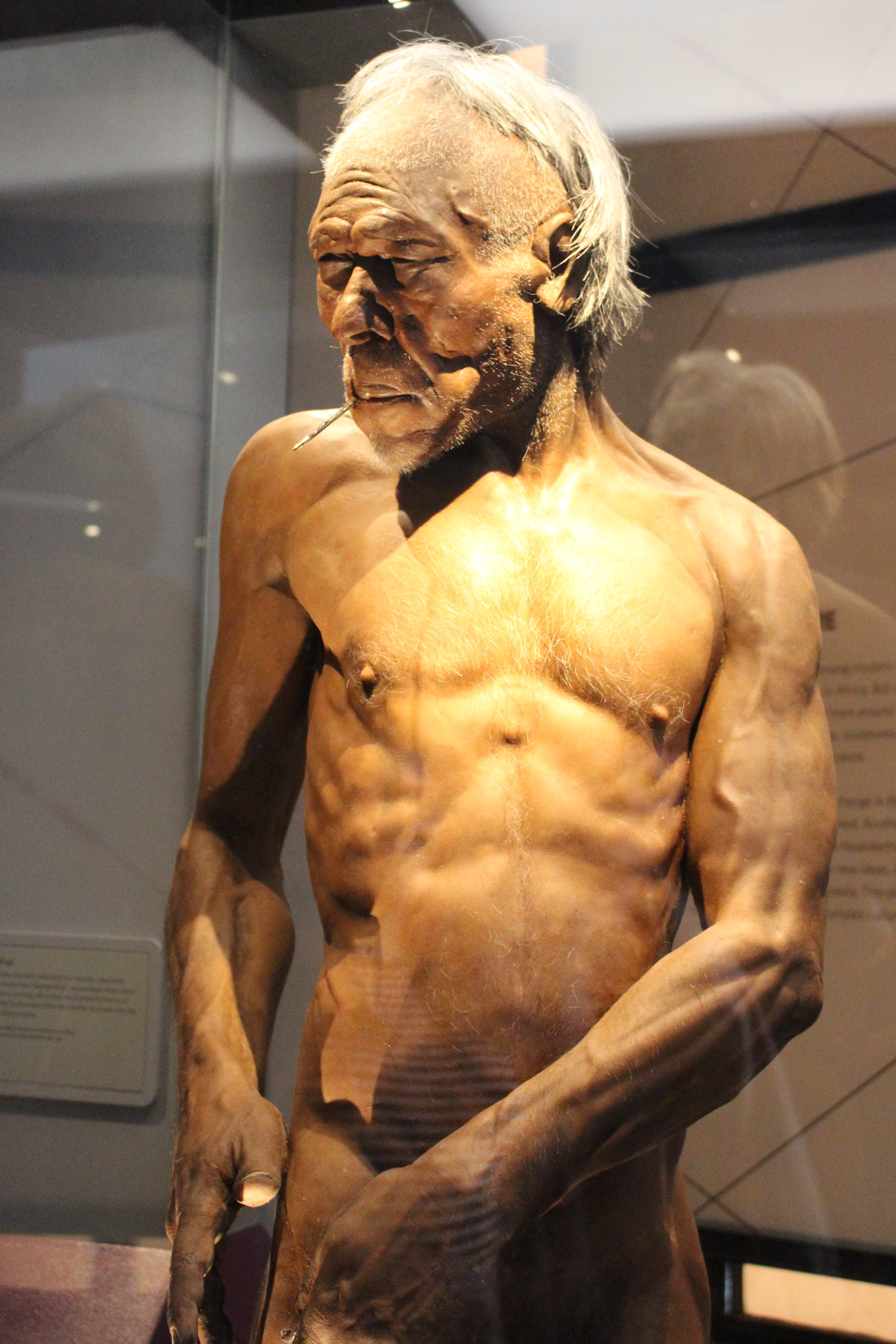
Reconstruction of a modern man from southwestern Europe c. 30 000 years BP, London Natural History Museum.

Following the peopling of Africa some 130,000 years ago, and the recent Out-of-Africa expansion some 70,000 to 50,000 years ago, some sub-populations of H. sapiens had been essentially isolated for tens of thousands of years prior to the early modern Age of Discovery. Combined with archaic admixture this has resulted in significant genetic variation, which in some instances has been shown to be the result of directional selection taking place over the past 15,000 years, i.e., significantly later than possible archaic admixture events.

Some climatic adaptations, such as high-altitude adaptation in humans, are thought to have been acquired by archaic admixture. Introgression of genetic variants acquired by Neanderthal admixture have different distributions in European and East Asians, reflecting differences in recent selective pressures. A 2014 study reported that Neanderthal-derived variants found in East Asian populations showed clustering in functional groups related to immune and haematopoietic pathways, while European populations showed clustering in functional groups related to the lipid catabolic process. (Note: "Specifically, genes in the LCP [lipid catabolic process] term had the greatest excess of NLS in populations of European descent, with an average NLS frequency of 20.8±2.6% versus 5.9±0.08% genome wide (two-sided t-test, P<0.0001, n=379 Europeans and n=246 Africans). Further, among examined out-of-Africa human populations, the excess of NLS [Neanderthal-like genomic sites] in LCP genes was only observed in individuals of European descent: the average NLS frequency in Asians is 6.7±0.7% in LCP genes versus 6.2±0.06% genome wide.") A 2017 study found correlation of Neanderthal admixture in phenotypic traits in modern European populations.

Physiological or phenotypical changes have been traced to Upper Paleolithic mutations, such as the East Asian variant of the EDAR gene, dated to c. 35,000 years ago. (Note: Traits affected by the mutation are sweat glands, teeth, hair thickness and breast tissue.)

Recent divergence of Eurasian lineages was sped up significantly during the Last Glacial Maximum, the Mesolithic and the Neolithic, due to increased selection pressures and due to founder effects associated with migration. Alleles predictive of light skin have been found in Neanderthals, but the alleles for light skin in Europeans and East Asians, associated with KITLG and ASIP, are (as of 2012) thought to have not been acquired by archaic admixture but recent mutations since the Last Glacial Maximum. Phenotypes associated with the "white" or "Caucasian" populations of Western Eurasian stock emerge during the Last Glacial Maximum, from about 19,000 years ago. Average cranial capacity in modern human populations varies in the range of 1,200 to 1,450 cm^{3} for adult males. Larger cranial volume is associated with climatic region, the largest averages being found in populations of Siberia and the Arctic. (Note: "We offer an alternative hypothesis that suggests that hominid expansion into regions of cold climate produced change in head shape. Such change in shape contributed to the increased cranial volume. Bioclimatic effects directly upon body size (and indirectly upon brain size) in combination with cranial globularity appear to be a fairly powerful explanation of ethnic group differences." (figure in Beals, p304)) Both Neanderthal and European early modern humans had somewhat larger cranial volumes on average than modern Europeans, suggesting the relaxation of selection pressures for larger brain volume after the end of the Last Glacial Maximum.

Examples for still later adaptations related to agriculture and animal domestication including East Asian types of ADH1B associated with rice domestication, or lactase persistence, are due to recent selection pressures.

An even more recent adaptation has been proposed for the Austronesian Sama-Bajau, developed under selection pressures associated with subsisting on freediving over the past thousand years or so.

== Behavioral modernity ==
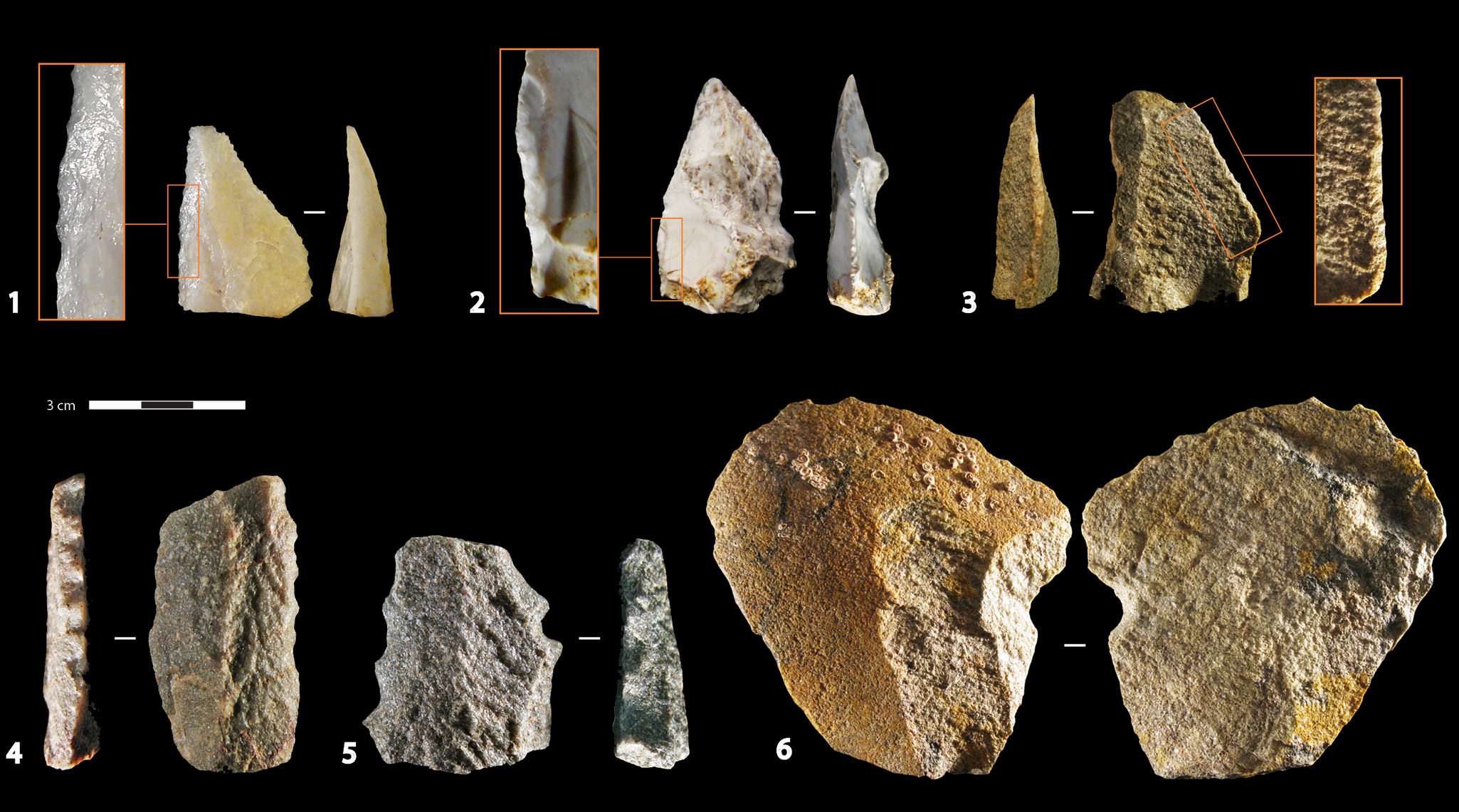
Lithic Industries of early Homo sapiens at Blombos Cave (M3 phase, MIS 5), Southern Cape, South Africa (c. 105,000 – 90,000 years old)

Behavioral modernity, involving the development of language, figurative art and early forms of religion (etc.) is taken to have arisen before 40,000 years ago, marking the beginning of the Upper Paleolithic (in African contexts also known as the Later Stone Age).

There is considerable debate regarding whether the earliest anatomically modern humans behaved similarly to recent or existing humans. Behavioral modernity is taken to include fully developed language (requiring the capacity for abstract thought), artistic expression, early forms of religious behavior, increased cooperation and the formation of early settlements, and the production of articulated tools from lithic cores, bone or antler. The term Upper Paleolithic is intended to cover the period since the rapid expansion of modern humans throughout Eurasia, which coincides with the first appearance of Paleolithic art such as cave paintings and the development of technological innovation such as the spear-thrower. The Upper Paleolithic begins around 50,000 to 40,000 years ago, and also coincides with the disappearance of archaic humans such as the Neanderthals.

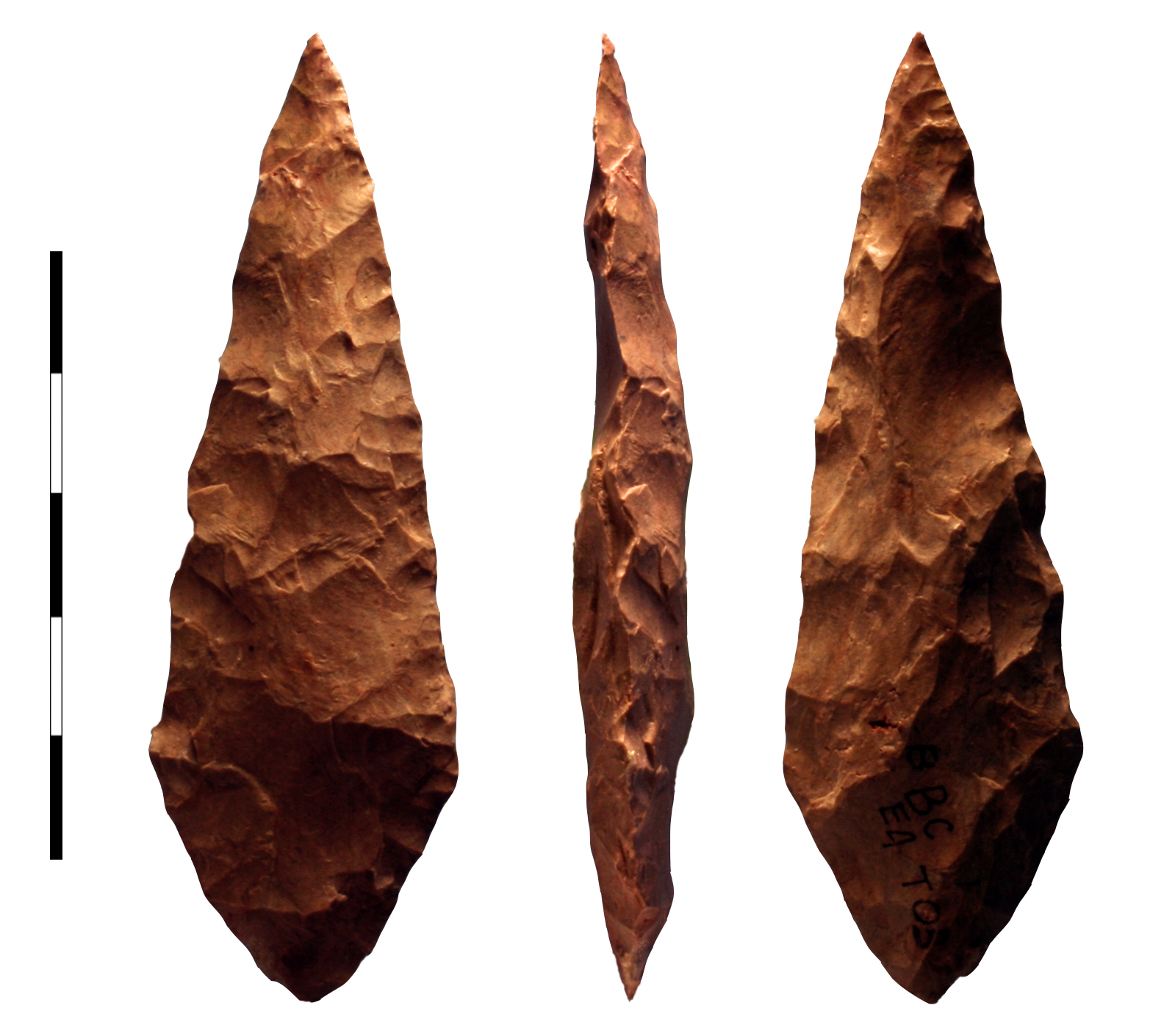
Bifacial silcrete point of early Homo sapiens, from M1 phase (71,000 BCE) layer of Blombos Cave, South Africa

The term "behavioral modernity" is somewhat disputed. It is most often used for the set of characteristics marking the Upper Paleolithic, but some scholars use "behavioral modernity" for the emergence of H. sapiens around 200,000 years ago, while others use the term for the rapid developments occurring around 50,000 years ago. It has been proposed that the emergence of behavioral modernity was a gradual process.

=== Examples of behavioral modernity ===
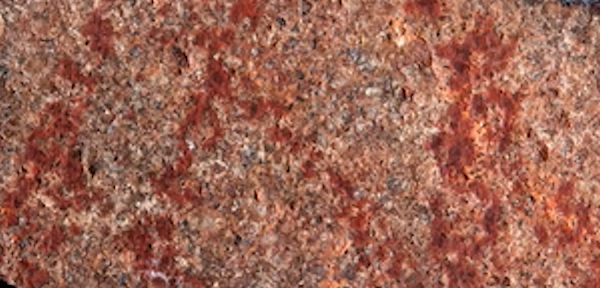
Claimed "oldest known drawing by human hands", discovered in Blombos Cave in South Africa. Estimated to be a 73,000-year-old work of a Homo sapiens.

The equivalent of the Eurasian Upper Paleolithic in African archaeology is known as the Later Stone Age, also beginning roughly 40,000 years ago. While most clear evidence for behavioral modernity uncovered from the later 19th century was from Europe, such as the Venus figurines and other artefacts from the Aurignacian, more recent archaeological research has shown that all essential elements of the kind of material culture typical of contemporary San hunter-gatherers in Southern Africa was also present by at least 40,000 years ago, including digging sticks of similar materials used today, ostrich egg shell beads, bone arrow heads with individual maker's marks etched and embedded with red ochre, and poison applicators.

There is also a suggestion that "pressure flaking best explains the morphology of lithic artifacts recovered from the c. 75-ka Middle Stone Age levels at Blombos Cave, South Africa. The technique was used during the final shaping of Still Bay bifacial points made on heat‐treated silcrete." Both pressure flaking and heat treatment of materials were previously thought to have occurred much later in prehistory, and both indicate a behaviourally modern sophistication in the use of natural materials. Further reports of research on cave sites along the southern African coast indicate that "the debate as to when cultural and cognitive characteristics typical of modern humans first appeared" may be coming to an end, as "advanced technologies with elaborate chains of production" which "often demand high-fidelity transmission and thus language" have been found at the South African Pinnacle Point Site 5–6. These have been dated to approximately 71,000 years ago. The researchers suggest that their research "shows that microlithic technology originated early in South Africa by 71 kya, evolved over a vast time span (c. 11,000 years), and was typically coupled to complex heat treatment that persisted for nearly 100,000 years. Advanced technologies in Africa were early and enduring; a small sample of excavated sites in Africa is the best explanation for any perceived 'flickering' pattern."

Increases in behavioral complexity have been speculated to have been linked to an earlier climatic change to much drier conditions between 135,000 and 75,000 years ago. This might have led to human groups who were seeking refuge from the inland droughts, expanded along the coastal marshes rich in shellfish and other resources. Since sea levels were low due to so much water tied up in glaciers, such marshlands would have occurred all along the southern coasts of Eurasia. The use of rafts and boats may well have facilitated exploration of offshore islands and travel along the coast, and eventually permitted expansion to New Guinea and then to Australia.

In addition, a variety of other evidence of abstract imagery, widened subsistence strategies, and other "modern" behaviors has been discovered in Africa, especially South, North, and East Africa, predating 50,000 years ago (with some predating 100,000 years ago). The Blombos Cave site in South Africa, for example, is famous for rectangular slabs of ochre engraved with geometric designs. Using multiple dating techniques, the site was confirmed to be around 77,000 and 100,000–75,000 years old. Ostrich egg shell containers engraved with geometric designs dating to 60,000 years ago were found at Diepkloof, South Africa. Beads and other personal ornamentation have been found from Morocco which might be as much as 130,000 years old; as well, the Cave of Hearths in South Africa has yielded a number of beads dating from significantly prior to 50,000 years ago, and shell beads dating to about 75,000 years ago have been found at Blombos Cave, South Africa. Specialized projectile weapons as well have been found at various sites in Middle Stone Age Africa, including bone and stone arrowheads at South African sites such as Sibudu Cave (along with an early bone needle also found at Sibudu) dating approximately 72,000–60,000 years ago some of which may have been tipped with poisons, and bone harpoons at the Central African site of Katanda dating ca. 90,000 years ago. Evidence also exists for the systematic heat treating of silcrete stone to increase its flake-ability for the purpose of toolmaking, beginning approximately 164,000 years ago at the South African site of Pinnacle Point and becoming common there for the creation of microlithic tools at about 72,000 years ago.

In 2008, an ochre processing workshop likely for the production of paints was uncovered dating to ca. 100,000 years ago at Blombos Cave, South Africa. Analysis shows that a liquefied pigment-rich mixture was produced and stored in the two abalone shells, and that ochre, bone, charcoal, grindstones and hammer-stones also formed a composite part of the toolkits. Evidence for the complexity of the task includes procuring and combining raw materials from various sources (implying they had a mental template of the process they would follow), possibly using pyrotechnology to facilitate fat extraction from bone, using a probable recipe to produce the compound, and the use of shell containers for mixing and storage for later use. Modern behaviors, such as the making of shell beads, bone tools and arrows, and the use of ochre pigment, are evident at a Kenyan site by 78,000-67,000 years ago. Evidence of early stone-tipped projectile weapons (a characteristic tool of Homo sapiens), the stone tips of javelins or throwing spears, were discovered in 2013 at the Ethiopian site of Gademotta, and date to around 279,000 years ago.

Expanding subsistence strategies beyond big-game hunting and the consequential diversity in tool types have been noted as signs of behavioral modernity. A number of South African sites have shown an early reliance on aquatic resources from fish to shellfish. Pinnacle Point, in particular, shows exploitation of marine resources as early as 120,000 years ago, perhaps in response to more arid conditions inland. Establishing a reliance on predictable shellfish deposits, for example, could reduce mobility and facilitate complex social systems and symbolic behavior. Blombos Cave and Site 440 in Sudan both show evidence of fishing as well. Taphonomic change in fish skeletons from Blombos Cave have been interpreted as capture of live fish, clearly an intentional human behavior.

Humans in North Africa (Nazlet Sabaha, Egypt) are known to have dabbled in chert mining, as early as ≈100,000 years ago, for the construction of stone tools.

Evidence was found in 2018, dating to about 320,000 years ago at the site of Olorgesailie in Kenya, of the early emergence of modern behaviors including: the trade and long-distance transportation of resources (such as obsidian), the use of pigments, and the possible making of projectile points. The authors of three 2018 studies on the site observe that the evidence of these behaviors is roughly contemporary with the earliest known Homo sapiens fossil remains from Africa (such as at Jebel Irhoud and Florisbad), and they suggest that complex and modern behaviors began in Africa around the time of the emergence of Homo sapiens.

In 2019, further evidence of Middle Stone Age complex projectile weapons in Africa was found at Aduma, Ethiopia, dated 100,000–80,000 years ago, in the form of points considered likely to belong to darts delivered by spear throwers.

== Pace of progress during Homo sapiens history ==
Homo sapiens technological and cultural progress appears to have been very much faster in recent millennia than in Homo sapiens early periods. The pace of development may indeed have accelerated, due to massively larger population (so more humans extant to think of innovations), more communication and sharing of ideas among human populations, and the accumulation of thinking tools.
