= Prehistoric Africa =

Prehistory of Africa

The prehistory of Africa spans from the earliest human presence in Africa until the ancient period in the history of Africa.

== Paleolithic ==
=== Lower Paleolithic ===
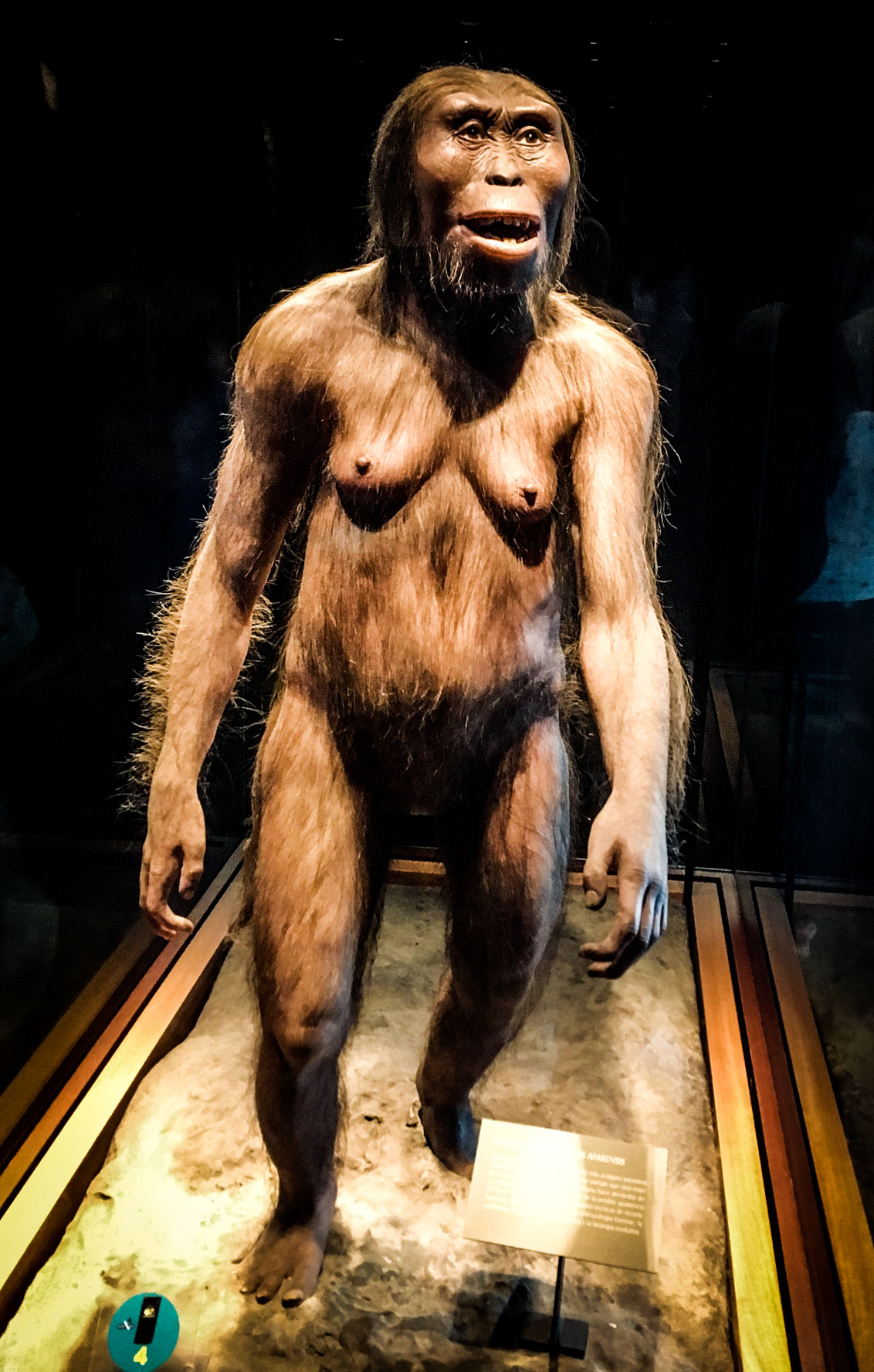
Reconstruction of "Lucy"

The first known hominids evolved in Africa. According to paleontology, the early hominids' skull anatomy was similar to that of the gorilla and the chimpanzee, great apes that also evolved in Africa, but the hominids had adopted a bipedal locomotion which freed their hands. This gave them a crucial advantage, enabling them to live in both forested areas and on the open savanna at a time when Africa was drying up and the savanna was encroaching on forested areas.

By 4 million years ago, several australopithecine hominid species had developed throughout Southern, Eastern and Central Africa. They were tool users, and makers of tools. They scavenged for meat and were omnivores.

By approximately 3.3 million years ago, primitive stone tools were first used to scavenge kills made by other predators and to harvest carrion and marrow from their bones. In hunting, Homo habilis was probably not capable of competing with large predators and was still more prey than hunter. H. habilis probably did steal eggs from nests and may have been able to catch small game and weakened larger prey (cubs and older animals). The tools were classed as Oldowan.

Around 1.8 million years ago, Homo ergaster first appeared in the fossil record in Africa. From Homo ergaster, Homo erectus evolved 1.5 million years ago. Some of the earlier representatives of this species were still fairly small-brained and used primitive stone tools, much like H. habilis. The brain later grew in size, and H. erectus eventually developed a more complex stone tool technology called the Acheulean. Possibly the first hunters, H. erectus mastered the art of making fire and was the first hominid to leave Africa, colonizing most of Afro-Eurasia and perhaps later giving rise to Homo floresiensis. Although some recent writers have suggested that Homo georgicus was the first and primary hominid ever to live outside Africa, many scientists consider H. georgicus to be an early and primitive member of the H. erectus species.

=== Middle Paleolithic ===
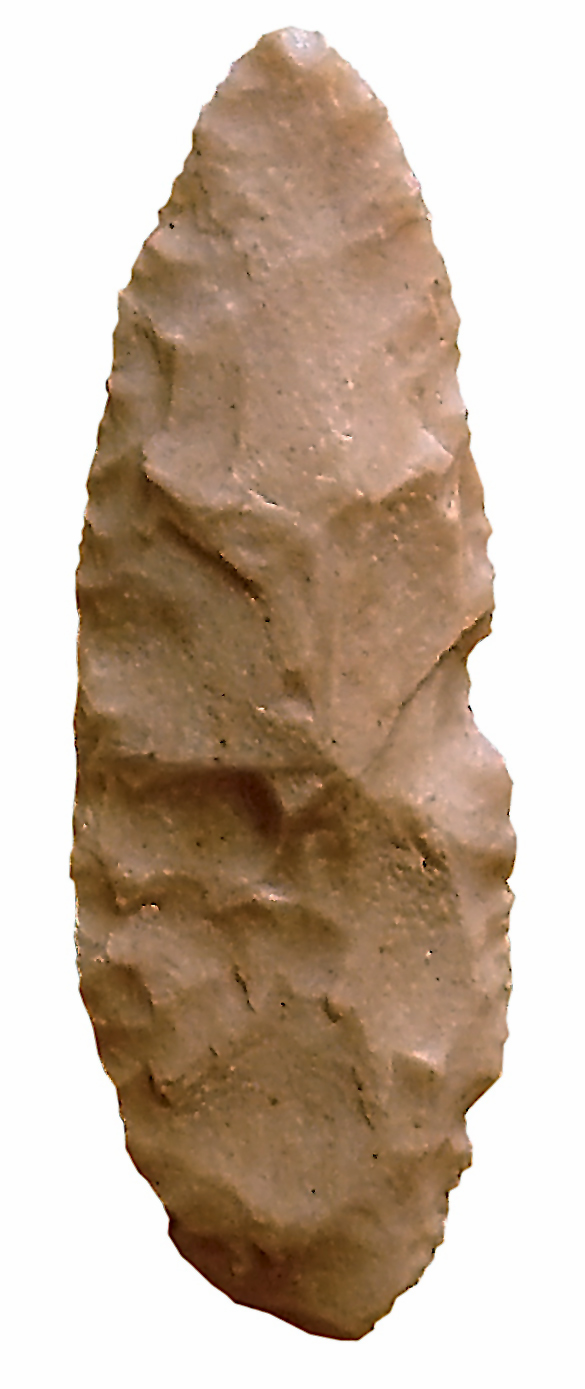
African biface artifact (spear point) dated in Late Stone Age period

The fossil record shows Homo sapiens (also known as "modern humans" or "anatomically modern humans") living in Africa by about 350,000-260,000 years ago. The earliest known Homo sapiens fossils include the Jebel Irhoud remains from Morocco (c. 315,000 years ago), the Florisbad Skull from South Africa (c. 259,000 years ago), and the Omo remains from Ethiopia (c. 233,000 years ago). Scientists have suggested that Homo sapiens may have arisen between 350,000 and 260,000 years ago through a merging of populations in East Africa and South Africa.

Evidence of a variety of behaviors indicative of Behavioral modernity date to the African Middle Stone Age, associated with early Homo sapiens and their emergence. Abstract imagery, widened subsistence strategies, and other "modern" behaviors have been discovered from that period in Africa, especially South, North, and East Africa. The Blombos Cave site in South Africa, for example, is famous for rectangular slabs of ochre engraved with geometric designs. Using multiple dating techniques, the site was confirmed to be around 77,000 and 100–75,000 years old. Ostrich egg shell containers engraved with geometric designs dating to 60,000 years ago were found at Diepkloof, South Africa. Beads and other personal ornamentation have been found from Morocco which might be as much as 130,000 years old; as well, the Cave of Hearths in South Africa has yielded a number of beads dating from significantly prior to 50,000 years ago, and shell beads dating to about 75,000 years ago have been found at Blombos Cave, South Africa.

Specialized projectile weapons as well have been found at various sites in Middle Stone Age Africa, including bone and stone arrowheads at South African sites such as Sibudu Cave (along with an early bone needle also found at Sibudu) dating approximately 60,000-70,000 years ago, and bone harpoons at the Central African site of Katanda dating to about 90,000 years ago. Evidence also exists for the systematic heat treating of silcrete stone to increase its flake-ability for the purpose of toolmaking, beginning approximately 164,000 years ago at the South African site of Pinnacle Point and becoming common there for the creation of microlithic tools at about 72,000 years ago. Early stone-tipped projectile weapons (a characteristic tool of Homo sapiens), the stone tips of javelins or throwing spears, were discovered in 2013 at the Ethiopian site of Gademotta, and date to around 279,000 years ago.

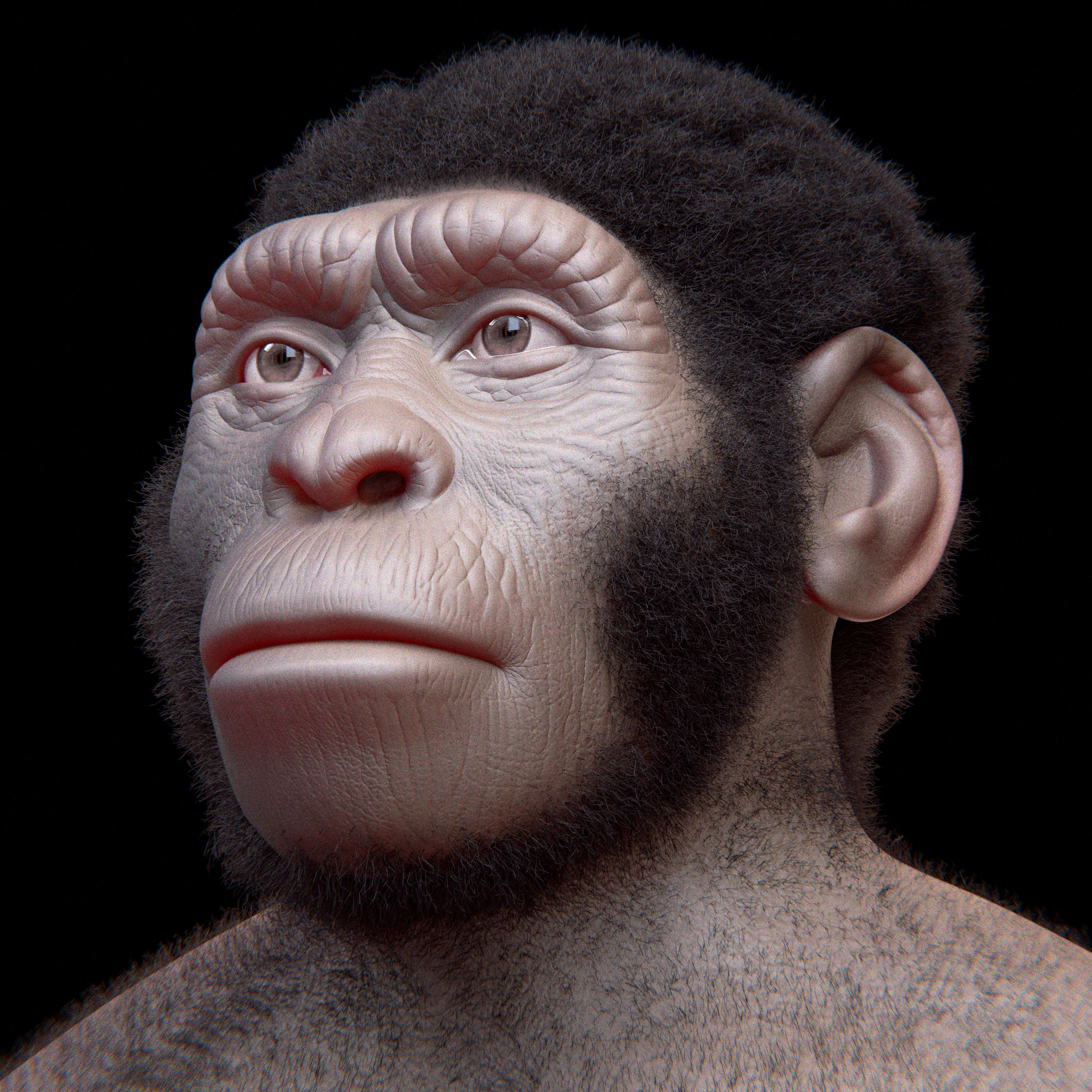
Homo naledi likely coexisted with modern humans in Africa about 300,000 years ago.

In 2008, an ochre processing workshop likely for the production of paints was uncovered dating to ca. 100,000 years ago at Blombos Cave, South Africa. Analysis shows that a liquefied pigment-rich mixture was produced and stored in the two abalone shells, and that ochre, bone, charcoal, grindstones and hammer-stones also formed a composite part of the toolkits. Evidence for the complexity of the task includes procuring and combining raw materials from various sources (implying they had a mental template of the process they would follow), possibly using pyrotechnology to facilitate fat extraction from bone, using a probable recipe to produce the compound, and the use of shell containers for mixing and storage for later use. Modern behaviors, such as the making of shell beads, bone tools and arrows, and the use of ochre pigment, are evident at a Kenyan site by 78,000-67,000 years ago.

Expanding subsistence strategies beyond big-game hunting and the consequential diversity in tool types has been noted as signs of behavioral modernity. A number of South African sites have shown an early reliance on aquatic resources from fish to shellfish. Pinnacle Point, in particular, shows exploitation of marine resources as early as 120,000 years ago, perhaps in response to more arid conditions inland. Establishing a reliance on predictable shellfish deposits, for example, could reduce mobility and facilitate complex social systems and symbolic behavior. Blombos Cave and Site 440 in Sudan both show evidence of fishing as well. Taphonomic change in fish skeletons from Blombos Cave have been interpreted as capture of live fish, clearly an intentional human behavior. Humans in North Africa (Nazlet Sabaha, Egypt) are known to have dabbled in chert mining, as early as ≈100,000 years ago, for the construction of stone tools.

Successive expansions of Homo erectus (yellow), Homo neanderthalensis (ochre) and Homo sapiens (red).

Evidence was found in 2018, dating to about 320,000 years ago, at the Kenyan site of Olorgesailie, of the early emergence of modern behaviors including: long-distance trade networks (involving goods such as obsidian), the use of pigments, and the possible making of projectile points. It is observed by the authors of three 2018 studies on the site, that the evidence of these behaviors is approximately contemporary to the earliest known Homo sapiens fossil remains from Africa (such as at Jebel Irhoud and Florisbad), and they suggest that complex and modern behaviors began in Africa around the time of the emergence of Homo sapiens. In 2019, further evidence of early complex projectile weapons in Africa was found at Adouma, Ethiopia dated 80,000-100,000 years ago, in the form of points considered likely to belong to darts delivered by spear throwers.

=== Upper Paleolithic ===
Around 65–50,000 years ago, the species' expansion out of Africa launched the colonization of the planet by modern human beings. By 10,000 BC, Homo sapiens had spread to most corners of Afro-Eurasia. Their dispersals are traced by linguistic, cultural and genetic evidence. Eurasian back-migrations, specifically West-Eurasian backflow, started in the early Holocene or already earlier in the Paleolithic period, sometimes between 30-15,000 years ago, followed by pre-Neolithic and Neolithic migration waves from the Middle East, mostly affecting Northern Africa, the Horn of Africa, and wider regions of the Sahel zone and East Africa.

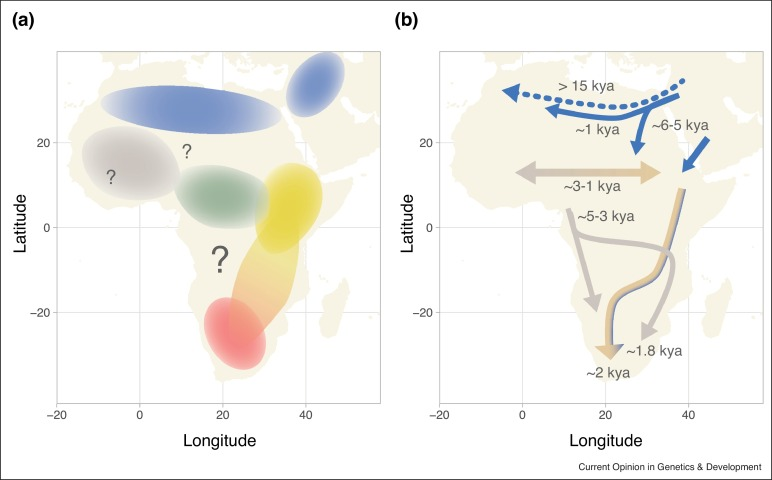
Pre-Neolithic and Neolithic migration events in Africa.

Affad 23 is an archaeological site located in the Affad region of southern Dongola Reach in northern Sudan, which hosts "the well-preserved remains of prehistoric camps (relics of the oldest open-air hut in the world) and diverse hunting and gathering loci some 50,000 years old".

The earliest physical evidence of astronomical activity may be a lunar calendar found on the Ishango bone dated to between 23,000 and 18,000 BC from in what is now the Democratic Republic of the Congo. However, this interpretation of the object's purpose is disputed.

Scholars have argued that warfare was absent throughout much of humanity's prehistoric past, and that it emerged from more complex political systems as a result of sedentism, agricultural farming, etc. However, the findings at the site of Nataruk in Turkana County, Kenya, where the remains of 27 individuals who died as the result of an intentional attack by another group 10,000 years ago, suggest that inter-human conflict has a much longer history.

== Emergence of agriculture and desertification of the Sahara ==
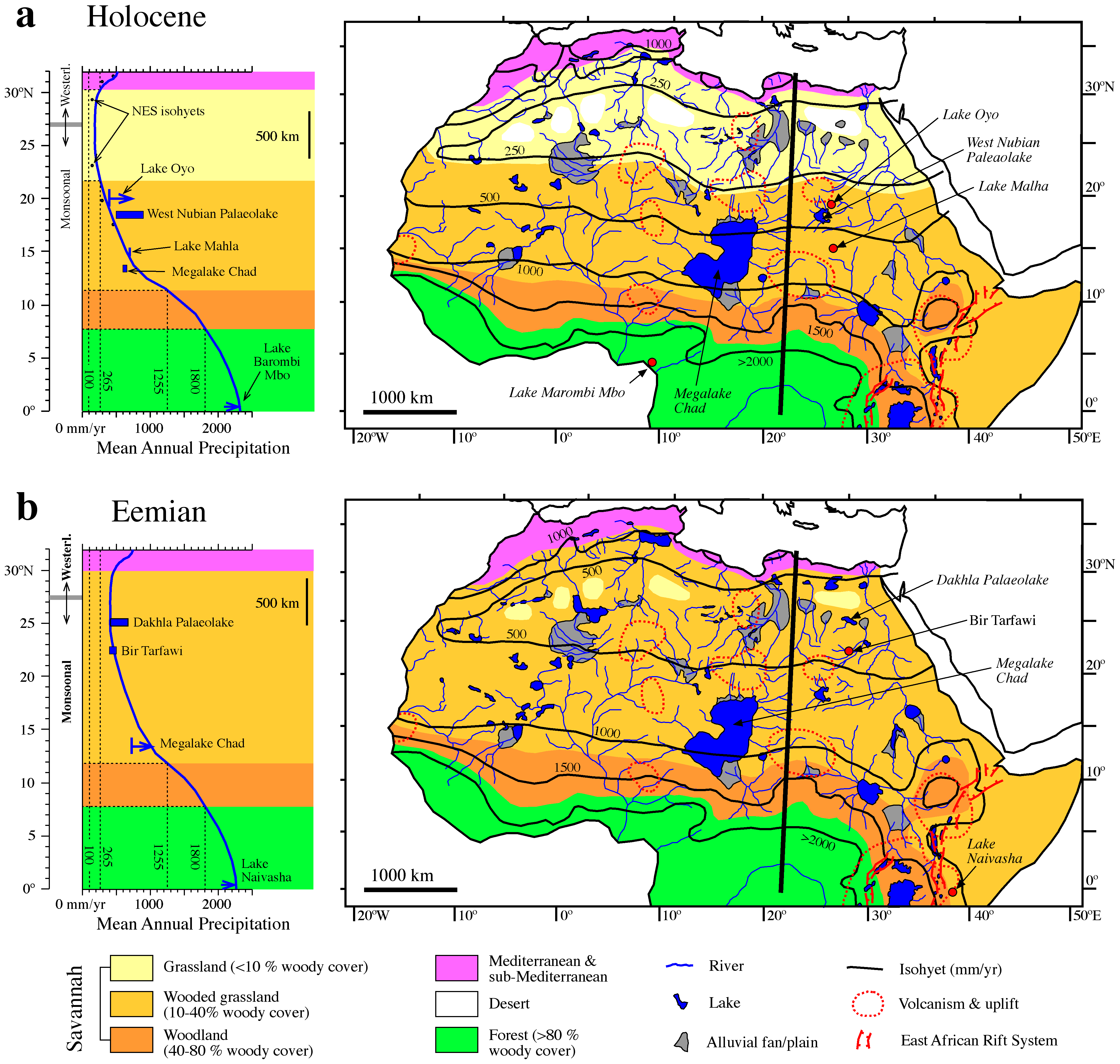
Vegetation and water bodies in early Holocene (top), between about 12,000 and 7,000 years ago, and Eemian (bottom)

Around 16,000 BC, from the Red Sea Hills to the northern Ethiopian Highlands, nuts, grasses and tubers were being collected for food. By 13,000 to 11,000 BC, people began collecting wild grains. This spread to Western Asia, which domesticated its wild grains, wheat and barley. Between 10,000 and 8000 BC, Northeast Africa was cultivating wheat and barley and raising sheep and cattle from Southwest Asia. A wet climatic phase in Africa turned the Ethiopian Highlands into a mountain forest. Omotic speakers domesticated enset around 6500–5500 BC. Around 7000 BC, the settlers of the Ethiopian highlands domesticated donkeys, and by 4000 BC domesticated donkeys had spread to Southwest Asia. Cushitic speakers, partially turning away from cattle herding, domesticated teff and finger millet between 5500 and 3500 BC.

During the 11th millennium BP, pottery was independently invented in Africa, with the earliest pottery there dating to about 9,400 BC from central Mali. It soon spread throughout the southern Sahara and Sahel. In the steppes and savannahs of the Sahara and Sahel in Northern West Africa, the Nilo-Saharan speakers and Mandé peoples started to collect and domesticate wild millet, African rice and sorghum between 8000 and 6000 BC. Later, gourds, watermelons, castor beans, and cotton were also collected and domesticated. The people started capturing wild cattle and holding them in circular thorn hedges, resulting in domestication. They also started making pottery and built stone settlements (e.g., Tichitt, Oualata). Fishing, using bone-tipped harpoons, became a major activity in the numerous streams and lakes formed from the increased rains. Mande peoples have been credited with the independent development of agriculture about 4000–3000 BC.

In West Africa, the wet phase ushered in an expanding rainforest and wooded savanna from Senegal to Cameroon. Between 9000 and 5000 BC, Niger–Congo speakers domesticated the oil palm and raffia palm. Two seed plants, black-eyed peas and voandzeia (African groundnuts), were domesticated, followed by okra and kola nuts. Since most of the plants grew in the forest, the Niger–Congo speakers invented polished stone axes for clearing forest.

Most of Southern Africa was occupied by pygmy peoples and Khoisan who engaged in hunting and gathering. Some of the oldest rock art was produced by them.

For several hundred thousand years the Sahara has alternated between desert and savanna grassland in a 41,000 year cycle caused by changes ("precession") in the Earth's axis as it rotates around the Sun which change the location of the North African Monsoon. When the North African monsoon is at its strongest annual precipitation and subsequent vegetation in the Sahara region increase, resulting in conditions commonly referred to as the "green Sahara". For a relatively weak North African monsoon, the opposite is true, with decreased annual precipitation and less vegetation resulting in a phase of the Sahara climate cycle known as the "desert Sahara". The Sahara has been a desert for several thousand years, and is expected to become green again in about 15,000 years time (17,000 AD).

Just prior to Saharan desertification, the communities that developed south of Egypt, in what is now Sudan, were full participants in the Neolithic Revolution and lived a settled to semi-nomadic lifestyle, with domesticated plants and animals. It has been suggested that megaliths found at Nabta Playa are examples of the world's first known archaeoastronomical devices, predating Stonehenge by some 1,000 years. The sociocultural complexity observed at Nabta Playa and expressed by different levels of authority within the society there has been suggested as forming the basis for the structure of both the Neolithic society at Nabta and the Old Kingdom of Egypt. By 5000 BC, Africa entered a dry phase, and the climate of the Sahara region gradually became drier. The population trekked out of the Sahara region in all directions, including towards the Nile Valley below the Second Cataract, where they made permanent or semipermanent settlements. A major climatic recession occurred, lessening the heavy and persistent rains in Central and Eastern Africa.

== Metallurgy ==
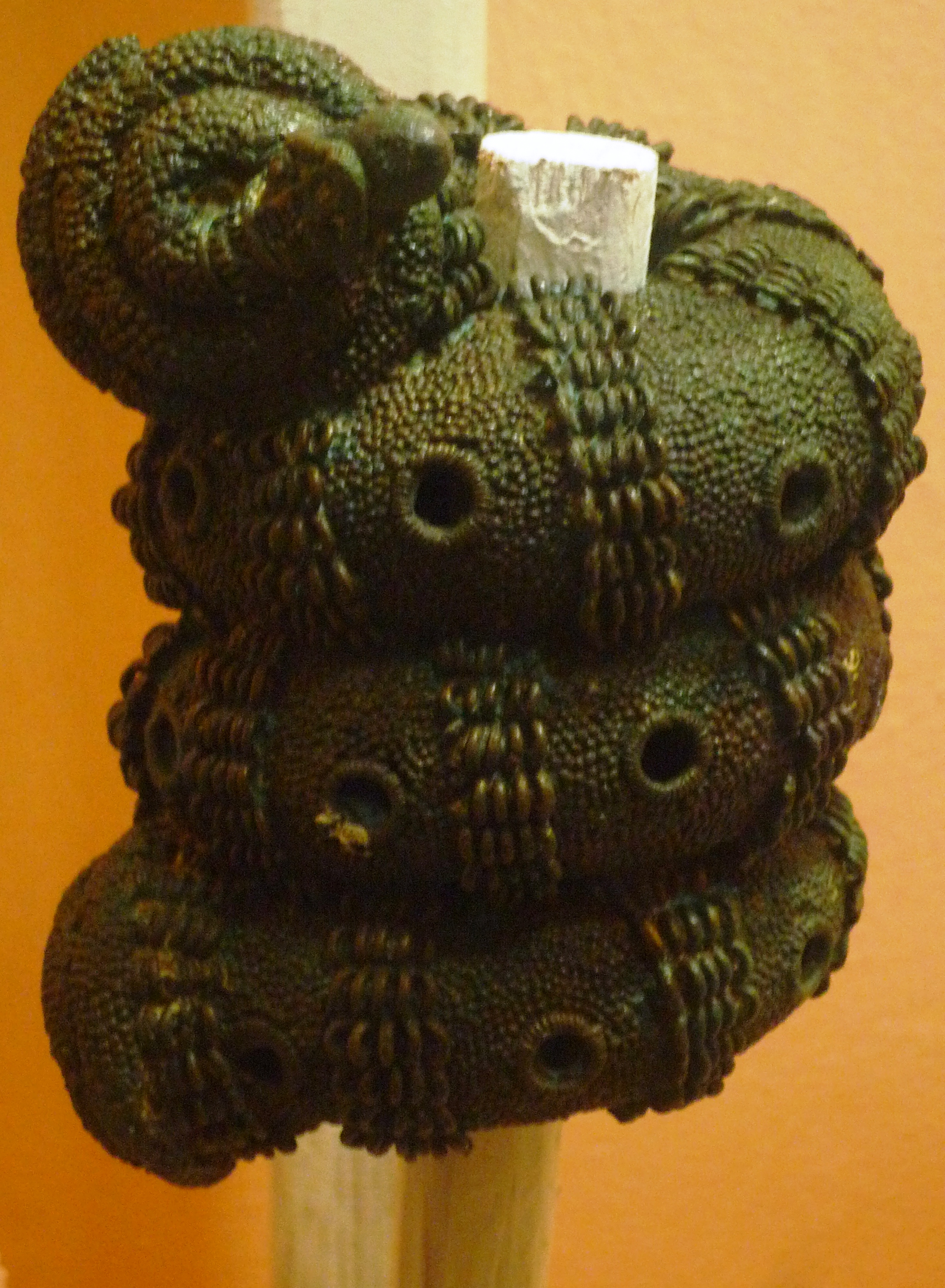
9th-century bronze staff head in form of a coiled snake, Igbo-Ukwu, Nigeria

Evidence of the early smelting of metals – lead, copper, and bronze – dates from the fourth millennium BC.

Egyptians smelted copper during the predynastic period, and bronze came into use after 3,000 BC at the latest in Egypt and Nubia. Nubia became a major source of copper as well as of gold. The use of gold and silver in Egypt dates back to the predynastic period.

In the Aïr Mountains of present-day Niger people smelted copper independently of developments in the Nile valley between 3,000 and 2,500 BC. They used a process unique to the region, suggesting that the technology was not brought in from outside; it became more mature by about 1,500 BC.

By the 1st millennium BC iron working had reached Northwestern Africa, Egypt, and Nubia. Zangato and Holl document evidence of iron-smelting in the Central African Republic and Cameroon that may date back to 3,000 to 2,500 BC. Assyrians using iron weapons pushed Nubians out of Egypt in 670 BC, after which the use of iron became widespread in the Nile valley.

The theory that iron spread to Sub-Saharan Africa via the Nubian city of Meroe is no longer widely accepted, and some researchers believe that sub-Saharan Africans invented iron metallurgy independently. Metalworking in West Africa has been dated as early as 2,500 BC at Egaro west of the Termit in Niger, and iron working was practiced there by 1,500 BC. Iron smelting has been dated to 2,000 BC in southeast Nigeria. Central Africa provides possible evidence of iron working as early as the 3rd millennium BC. Iron smelting developed in the area between Lake Chad and the African Great Lakes between 1,000 and 600 BC, and in West Africa around 2,000 BC, long before the technology reached Egypt. Before 500 BC, the Nok culture in the Jos Plateau was already smelting iron. Archaeological sites containing iron-smelting furnaces and slag have been excavated at sites in the Nsukka region of southeast Nigeria in Igboland: dating to 2,000 BC at the site of Lejja (Eze-Uzomaka 2009) and to 750 BC and at the site of Opi (Holl 2009). The site of Gbabiri (in the Central African Republic) has also yielded evidence of iron metallurgy, from a reduction furnace and blacksmith workshop; with earliest dates of 896–773 BC and 907–796 BC respectively.
