= Fauresmith (industry) =

Acheulian-Middle Stone Age stone tool industry

Selected Fauresmith sites from the ROAD database (CC BY-SA 4.0 ROCEEH)

In archaeology, Fauresmith industry is a stone tool industry that is transitional between the Acheulian and the Middle Stone Age. It is at the end of the Acheulian or beginning of the Middle Stone Age. It is named after the town of Fauresmith in South Africa. The Fauresmith is found at a number of other archaeological sites such as Wonderwerk Cave and Kathu Pan where it is potentially dated to at least 420,000 years ago. The Fauresmith consists of Middle Stone Age technology such as blades, points and prepared core technology as well as retaining handaxes from the Acheulian. The type sites are Brakfontein 321 and Riverview Estates Site VI. The Fauresmith culture shows Levalloisean influence, with hand-axes and flakes with faceted striking platforms. It is largely in the similar period with the Sangoan industry.
