= Yohannes Haile-Selassie =

Ethiopian paleoanthropologist (born 1961)

Yohannes Haile-Selassie Ambaye
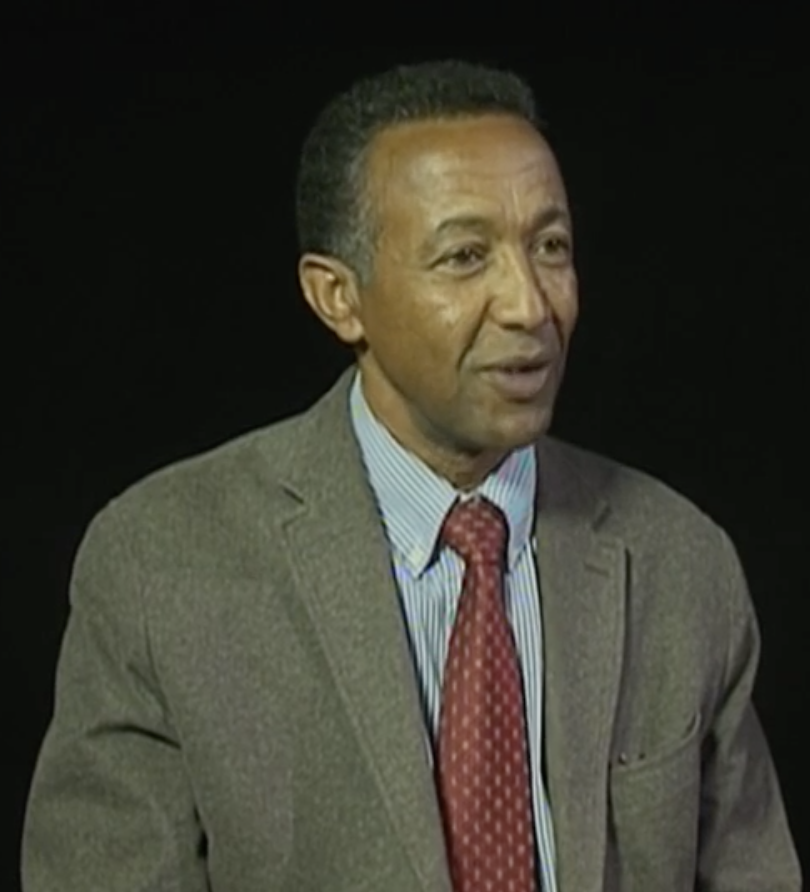
- Yohannes in 2017
- Born: Yohannes Haile Selassie; 23 February 1961 (age 65); Adigrat, Tigray Province, Ethiopian Empire
- Education: Addis Ababa University (B.A., 1982); University of California, Berkeley (M.A., 1995); University of California, Berkeley (Ph.D., 2001)
- Known for: Paleontology; Archaeology
- Scientific career
- Fields: Archeology
- Workplaces: Arizona State University; Institute of Human Origins; Case Western Reserve University; Cleveland Museum of Natural History; National Museum of Ethiopia; Mekelle University; Addis Ababa University
- Thesis: Late Miocene Mammalian Fauna from the Middle Awash Valley, Ethiopia (2001)
- Doctoral advisor: Tim D. White

Yohannes Haile-Selassie Ambaye (born 23 February 1961) is an Ethiopian paleoanthropologist. An authority on proto- and archaic human species (i.e., australopithecines), he particularly focuses his attention on the East African Rift and Middle Awash valleys. He was curator of Physical Anthropology at the Cleveland Museum of Natural History from 2002 until 2021, and now is serving as the director of the Arizona State University Institute of Human Origins. Since founding the institute in 1981, he has been the third director after Donald Johanson and William Kimbel.

== Biography ==
Haile-Selassie began his tertiary education at the Addis Ababa University in Addis Ababa, graduating in the summer of 1982 with a B.A. degree in history. His first job was at the Center for Research and Conservation of Cultural Heritage in Addis Ababa.

His graduate education began at the University of California, Berkeley, where Haile-Selassie was mentored by Tim White and earned an M.A. in anthropology in 1995 and a Ph.D. in Integrative Biology in 2001. In 2002, he became the Curator and Head of Physical Anthropology Department at the Cleveland Museum of Natural History in Cleveland, Ohio, where he works currently. He serves as an adjunct professor of Anthropology and Anatomy at Case Western Reserve University and as an Adjunct Associate Professor at the Institute of Paleoenvironment and Heritage Conservation, Mekelle University.

Yohannes is well known in the field of paleoanthropology for having a gift for fossil spotting, with his first fossil hunting expedition (White's Middle Awash Project) taking place in 1990. He has been instrumental in the discoveries of the type specimen (principal reference fossil) for Australopithecus garhi and Ardipithecus kadabba (both discovered in 1997), and he has also found fossil specimens of Ardipithecus ramidus, Australopithecus afarensis, and species of Homo including Homo erectus, as well as Homo sapiens. Since 2004, he has led digs in the Mille woreda of the Afar Region of Ethiopia (the Woranso-Mille Project). In June 2010, Haile-Selassie published a paper describing Kadanuumuu, one of the specimens his group found in Afar.

The research conducted by Haile-Selassie has been primarily funded by the Leakey Foundation. He has published in the American Journal of Physical Anthropology and Nature.
