= Middle Stone Age =

Period in African prehistory

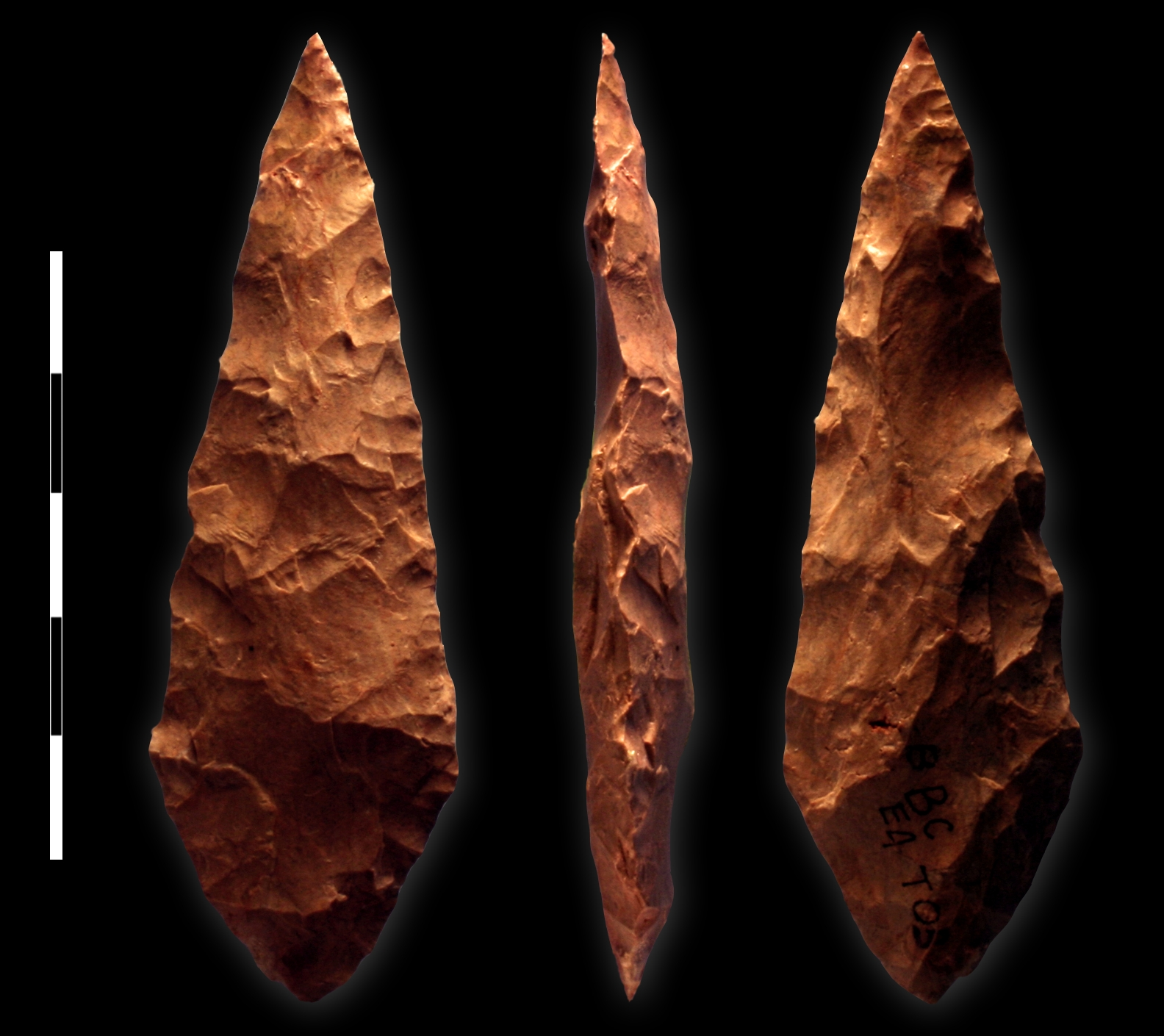
Middle Stone Age tool from Blombos Cave

Selected Middle Stone Age sites from the ROAD database (CC BY-SA 4.0 ROCEEH)

The Middle Stone Age (or MSA) was a period of African prehistory between the Early Stone Age and the Later Stone Age. It is generally considered to have begun around 280,000 years ago and ended around 50–25,000 years ago. The beginnings of particular MSA stone tools have their origins as far back as 550–500,000 years ago and as such some researchers consider this to be the beginnings of the MSA.

The MSA is often mistakenly understood to be synonymous with the Middle Paleolithic of Europe, especially due to their roughly contemporaneous time span; however, the Middle Paleolithic of Europe represents an entirely different hominin population, Homo neanderthalensis, than the MSA of Africa, which did not have Neanderthal populations. Additionally, current archaeological research in Africa has yielded much evidence to suggest that modern human behavior and cognition was beginning to develop much earlier in Africa during the MSA than it was in Europe during the Middle Paleolithic.

Evidence for symbolic behavior during the Middle Stone Age includes the deliberate use and long-distance transport of ochre in southern Africa and the production of perforated shell beads in North Africa. These materials suggest that early Homo sapiens were expressing social identity and maintaining exchange networks as early as 100,000–70,000 years ago, well before later Upper Paleolithic developments (Watts 2002; Bouzouggar et al. 2007).

The MSA is associated with both anatomically modern humans (Homo sapiens) as well as archaic Homo sapiens, sometimes referred to as Homo helmei. Early physical evidence comes from the Gademotta Formation in Ethiopia, the Kapthurin Formation in Kenya and Kathu Pan in South Africa.

== Regional development ==
There are MSA archaeological sites from across the African continent, conventionally divided into five regions: northern Africa, comprising parts of the modern countries of Morocco, Algeria, Tunisia, and Libya; eastern Africa, stretching roughly from the highlands of Ethiopia to the southern part of Kenya; central Africa, stretching from the borders of Tanzania and Kenya to include Angola; southern Africa, which includes the numerous cave sites of South Africa; and western Africa.

In northern and western Africa, the wet-dry cycles of the modern Sahara desert has led to fruitful archaeological sites followed by completely barren soil and vice versa. Preservation in these two regions can vary, yet the sites that have been uncovered document the adaptive nature of early humans to climatically unstable environments.

Eastern Africa represents some of the most reliable dates, due to the use of radiocarbon dating on volcanic ash deposits, as well as some of the earliest MSA sites. Faunal preservation, however, is not spectacular, and standardization in site excavation and lithic classification was, until recently, lacking. Unlike northern Africa, shifts between lithic technologies were not nearly as pronounced, likely due to more favorable climatic conditions that would have allowed for more continuous occupation of sites. Central Africa reflects similar patterning to eastern Africa, yet more archaeological research of the region is certainly required.

Southern Africa consists of many cave sites, most of which show very punctuated starts and stops in stone tool technology. Research in southern Africa has been continuous and quite standardized, allowing for reliable comparisons between sites in the region. Much of the archaeological evidence for the origins of modern human behavior is traced back to sites in this region, including Blombos Cave, Howiesons Poort, Still Bay, and Pinnacle Point.

== Transition from Acheulean ==
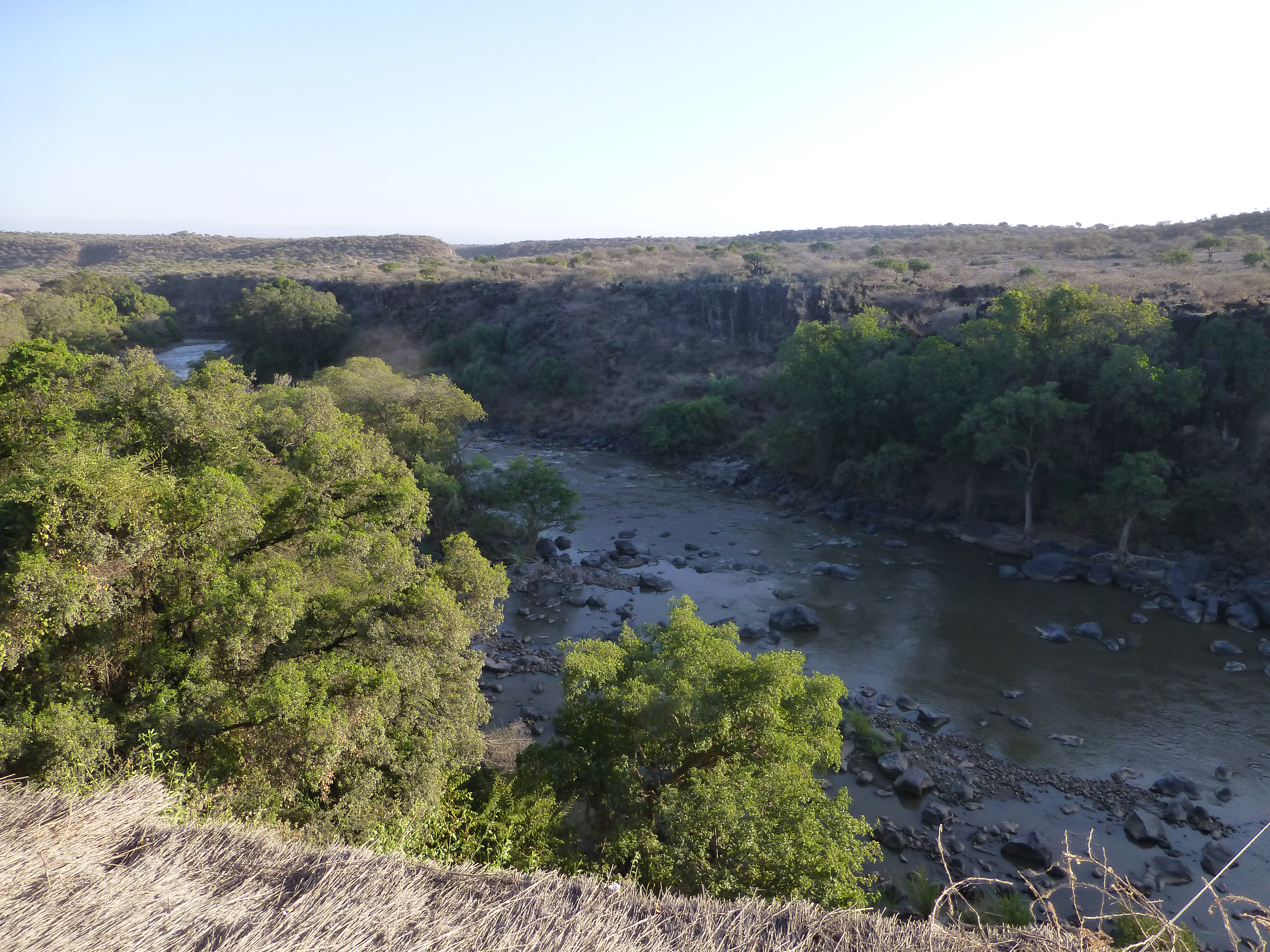
The Awash Valley

The term "Middle Stone Age" (MSA) was proposed to the African Archaeological Congress by Goodwin and Van Riet Lowe in 1929. The use of these terms was officially abandoned in 1965, although the term remains in use in the context of sub-Saharan Africa, beginning with a transitional late Acheulean period known as the Fauresmith industry. The Fauresmith industry is poorly dated, according to Herries (2011) beginning around 511–435 kya. This time, rather than the actual end of the Achaeulean around 130 kya is taken as the beginning of the MSA. The MSA so defined is associated with the gradual replacement of archaic humans by anatomically modern humans.

In a different convention, MSA refers to sites characterized by the use of Levallois methods for flake production, to the exclusion of Acheulean sites with large cleavers or handaxes. Following McBrearty and Tryon (2006), the term "early MSA" (EMSA) refers to sites predating the 126 kya interglacial, and "later MSA" (LMSA) refers to site younger than 126 kya. In this convention, Fauresmith sites of 500 to 300 kya are within the ESA, and the MSA begins after about 280 kya and is largely associated with H. sapiens, the earliest reliably dated MSA site in East Africa being Gademotta in Ethiopia, at 276 kya. The Middle Awash valley of Ethiopia and the Central Rift Valley of Kenya constituted a major center for behavioural innovation. It is likely that the large terrestrial mammal biomass of these regions supported substantial human populations with subsistence and manufacturing patterns similar to those of ethnographically known foragers.

Archaeological evidence from eastern Africa extending from the Rift Valley from Ethiopia to northern Tanzania represents the largest archaeological evidence of the shift from the Late Acheulian to the Middle Stone Age tool technologies. This transition is characterized by stratigraphic layering of Acheulian stone tools, a bifacial handaxe technology, underneath and even contemporaneous with MSA technologies, such as Levallois tools, flakes, flaked tools, pointed flakes, smaller bifaces that are projectile in form, and, on rare occasions, hafted tools. Evidence of the gradual displacement of Acheulian by MSA technologies is further supported by this layering and contemporaneous placement, as well as by the earliest appearance of MSA technologies at Gademotta and the latest Acheulian technologies at the Bouri Formation of Ethiopia, dated to 154 to 160 kya. This suggests a possible overlap of 100–150 thousand years.

Late Acheulean artefacts associated with Homo sapiens have been found in South African cave sites. The Cave of Hearths and Montague Cave in South Africa contain evidence of Acheulian technologies, as well as later MSA technologies, however there is no evidence of crossover in this region.

ESA Acheulean sites are well documented across West Africa (except from the most tropical regions) but mostly remain undated. A few late Acheulean sites ("MSA" in the sense of late Acheulean, not Levallois) have been dated. Middle Pleistocene (pre 126 kya) sites are known from the northern Sahelian zones, while Late Pleistocene (post 126 kya) sites are known both from northern and southern West Africa. Unlike elsewhere in Africa, MSA sites appear to persist until very late, down to the Holocene boundary (12 kya), pointing to the possibility of late survival of archaic humans, and late hybridization with H. sapiens in West Africa. Furthermore, such results highlight significant spatiotemporal cultural variability and suggest that long inter-group cultural differences played a major role in later stages of human evolution in Africa.

== Lithic technology ==
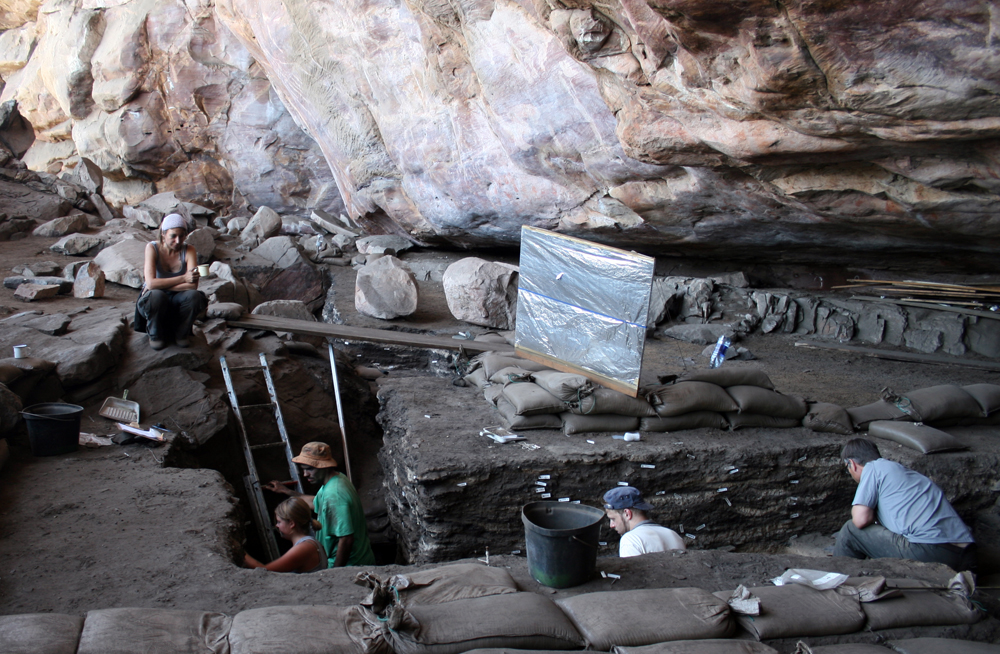
2009 excavations at the Diepkloof Rock Shelter

Early blades have been documented as far back as 550–500,000 years in the Kapthurin Formation in Kenya and Kathu Pan in South Africa. Backed pieces from the Twin Rivers and Kalambo Falls sites in Zambia, dated at sometime between 300 and 140,000 years, likewise indicate a suite of new behaviors. A high level of technical competence is also indicated for the c. 280 ka blades recovered from the Kapthurin Formation, Kenya.

The stone tool technology in use during the Middle Stone Age shows a mosaic of techniques. Beginning approximately 300 kya, the large cutting tools of the Achuelian are gradually displaced by Levallois prepared core technologies, also widely used by Neanderthals during the European Middle Palaeolithic. As the MSA progresses, highly varied technocomplexes become common throughout Africa and include pointed artifacts, blades, retouched flakes, end and side scrapers, grinding stones, and even bone tools. However, the use of blades (associated mainly with the Upper Palaeolithic in Europe) is seen at many sites as well. In Africa, blades may have been used during the transition from the Early Stone Age to the Middle Stone Age onwards. Finally, during the later part of the Middle Stone Age, microlithic technologies aimed at producing replaceable components of composite hafted tools are seen from at least 70 ka at sites such as Pinnacle Point and Diepkloof Rock Shelter in South Africa.

Artifact technology during the Middle Stone Age shows a pattern of innovation followed by disappearance. This occurs with technology such as the manufacture of shell beads, arrows and hide working tools including needles, and gluing technology. These pieces of evidence provide a counterpoint to the classic "Out of Africa" scenario in which increasing complexity accumulated during the Middle Stone Age. Instead, it has been argued that such technological innovations "appear, disappear and re-appear in a way that best fits a scenario in which historical contingencies and environmental rather than cognitive changes are seen as main drivers".

== Hominin evolution and migration ==
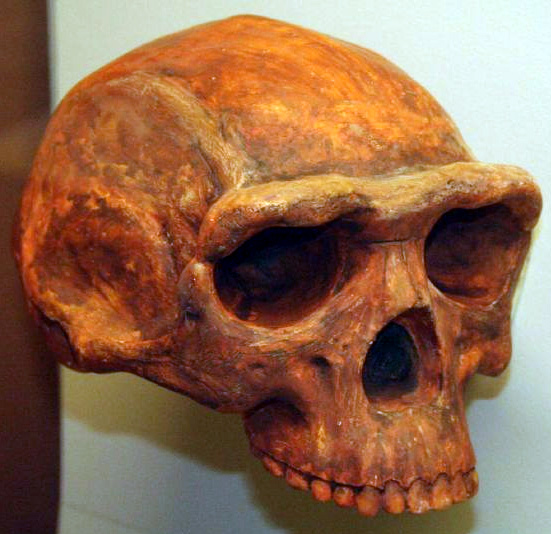
Homo erectus skull, Museum of Natural History, Ann Arbor

There have been two migration events out of Africa. The first was the expansion of H. erectus into Eurasia approximately 1.9 to 1.7 million years ago, and the second, by H. sapiens began during the MSA by 80 – 50 ka MSA out of Africa to Asia, Australia and Europe. Perhaps only in small numbers initially, but by 30 ka they had replaced Neanderthals and H. erectus. Each of these migrations represent the increased flexibility of the genus Homo to survive in widely varied climates. Based on the measurement of a large number of human skulls a recent study supports a central/southern African origin for Homo sapiens as this region shows the highest intra-population diversity in phenotypic measurements. Genetic data supports this conclusion. However, there is genetic evidence to suggest that dispersal out of Africa began in eastern Africa. Sites such as the Omo Kibish Formation, the Herto Member of the Bouri Formation, and Mumba Cave contain fossil evidence to support this conclusion as well.

== Evidence for modern human behavior ==
There have been a number of theories proposed regarding the development of modern human behavior, but in recent years the mosaic approach has been the most favored perspective in regards to the MSA, especially when taken in consideration with the archaeological evidence. Some scholars including Klein have argued for discontinuity, while others including McBrearty and Brooks have argued that cognitive advances can be detected in the MSA and that the origin of our species is linked with the appearance of Middle Stone Age technology at 250–300 ka. The earliest remains of Homo sapiens date back to approximately 300 thousand years ago in Africa. The continent was mainly populated by groups of hunter-gatherers. In the archaeological record of both eastern Africa and southern Africa, there is immense variability associated with Homo sapiens sites, and it is during this time that we see evidence of the origins of modern human behavior. According to McBrearty and Brooks, there are four features that are characteristic of modern human behavior: abstract thinking, the ability to plan and strategize, "behavioral, economic and technological innovativeness," and symbolic behavior. Many of these aspects of modern human behavior can be broken down into more specific categories, including art, personal adornment, technological advancement, yet these four overarching categories allow for a thorough, albeit significantly overlapping, discussion of behavioral modernity.

=== Possible cultural complexes ===
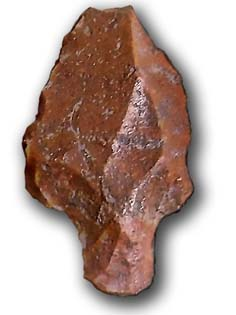
Aterian stone tool

As early Homo sapiens began to diversify the ecological zones that they inhabited during the MSA, the archaeological record associated with these zones begins to show evidence for regional continuities. These continuities are significant for a number of reasons. The expansion of Homo sapiens into various ecological zones demonstrates an ability to adapt to a variety of environmental contexts including marine environments, savanna grasslands, relatively arid deserts, and forests. This adaptability is reflected in MSA artifacts found in these zones. These artifacts display stylistic variability depending on zone. During the Acheulian, which spanned from 1.5 million years ago to 300 thousand years ago, lithic technology displayed incredible homogeneity throughout all ecological niches. MSA technologies, with their evidence for regional variability and continuity, represent a remarkable advance. These data have been used to support theories of social and stylistic development throughout the MSA.

In southern Africa, we see the technocomplexes of Howiesons Poort and Stillbay, named after the sites at which they were first discovered. Several others have not been dated or have been dated unreliably; these include the Lupemban technocomplex of central Africa, the Bambatan in southeast Africa, 70–80ka, and the Aterian technocomplex of northern Africa, 160–90ka.

=== Abstract thinking ===
Evidence of abstract thinking can be seen in the archaeological record as early as the Acheulean–Middle Stone Age transition, approximately 300,000–250,000 years ago. This transition involves a shift in stone tool technology from Mode 2, Acheulean tools, to Mode 3 and 4, which include blades and microliths. The manufacture of these tools requires planning and the understanding of how striking a stone will produce different flaking patterns. This requires abstract thought, one of the hallmarks of modern human behavior. The shift from large cutting tools in the Acheulian to smaller and more diversified toolkits in the MSA represents a better cognitive and conceptual understanding of flintknapping, as well as the potential functional effects of distinct tool types.

=== Planning depth ===
The ability to plan and strategize, much like abstract thinking, can be seen in the more diversified toolkit of the Middle Stone Age, as well as in the subsistence patterns of the period. As MSA hominins began to migrate into a range of different ecological zones, it became necessary to base hunting strategies around seasonally available resources. Awareness of seasonality is evident in the faunal remains found at temporary sites. In less forgiving ecological zones, this awareness would have been essential for survival and the ability to plan subsistence strategies based on this awareness demonstrates an ability to think beyond the present tense and act upon this knowledge.

This planning depth is also seen in the presence of exotic raw materials at a variety of sites throughout the MSA. Procurement of local raw materials would have been a simple task to accomplish, yet MSA sites regularly contain raw materials that were obtained from sources over 100 km away, and sometimes farther than 300 km. Obtaining raw materials from this distance would require an awareness of the resources, a perceived value in the resources, whether it be functional or symbolic, and, possibly, the ability to organize an exchange network in order to obtain the materials.

=== Innovation ===
The ability to expand into new environments throughout Africa and, ultimately, the world, displays a level of adaptability and, consequently, innovativeness that is often seen as characteristic of behavioral modernity. Middle Stone Age sites are found in a wide range of environments, including coastal and inland areas of southern and eastern Africa, and in at least one case MSA foragers were exploiting high-altitude glaciated environments, at Fincha Habera in Ethiopia. This, however, is not the only evidence of innovativeness that can be seen in early Homo sapiens. The development of new, regionally relevant tools, such as those used for the collection of marine resources seen at Abdur, Ethiopia, Pinnacle Point Cave, South Africa, and Blombos Cave, South Africa. The use of fire demonstrates another innovative aspect of human behavior when it is used in order to create stronger tools, such as the heated silcrete at Blombos, Howiesons Poort and Still Bay, and the heat treated bone tools from Still Bay.

Hafted tools are further representative of human innovation. The large cutting tools of the Acheulian technocomplex become smaller, as more complex tools are better suited towards the needs of highly diversified environments. Composite tools represent a new level of innovation in their increased efficacy and more complex manufacturing process. The ability to conceptualize beyond the mere reduction of stone cores demonstrates cognitive flexibility, and the use of glue, which was often processed with ochre, to attach flakes to hafts demonstrates an understanding of chemical changes that can be utilized beyond the simple use of color. Adhesives were used to construct hafted tools by 70ka at Sibudu Cave in South Africa. Many of these adhesives were made from local conifers of the genus Podocarpus, using a process based on distillation.

Other technological innovations of the period include specialized projectile weapons found at various sites in Middle Stone Age Africa such as: bone and stone arrowheads at South African sites such as Sibudu Cave (along with an early bone needle also found at Sibudu) dating approximately 60,000–70,000 years ago, and bone harpoons at the Central African site of Katanda dating to about 90,000 years ago. The arrows and needle, along with hide working tools, from Sibudu Cave are seen as evidence of making weapons with compound heat treated gluing technology. Evidence also exists for the systematic heat treating of silcrete stone to increase its flake-ability for the purpose of toolmaking, beginning approximately 164,000 years ago at the South African site of Pinnacle Point and becoming common there for the creation of microlithic tools at about 72,000 years ago.

Characteristically modern human behaviors, such as the making of shell beads, bone tools and arrows, and the use of ochre pigment, are evident at Panga ya Saidi in Kenya by 78,000–67,000 years ago. Evidence of early stone-tipped projectile weapons (a characteristic tool of Homo sapiens), the stone tips of javelins or throwing spears, were discovered in 2013 at the Ethiopian site of Gademotta, and date to around 279,000 years ago.

Evidence was found in 2018, dating to about 320,000 years ago, at the Kenyan site of Olorgesailie, of the early emergence of innovations and behaviors including: long-distance trade networks (involving goods such as obsidian), the use of pigments, and the possible making of projectile points. It is observed by the authors of three 2018 studies on the site, that the evidence of these behaviors is approximately contemporary to the earliest known Homo sapiens fossil remains from Africa (such as at Jebel Irhoud and Florisbad), and they suggest that complex and modern behaviors had already begun in Africa around the time of the emergence of Homo sapiens.

=== Symbolic behavior ===
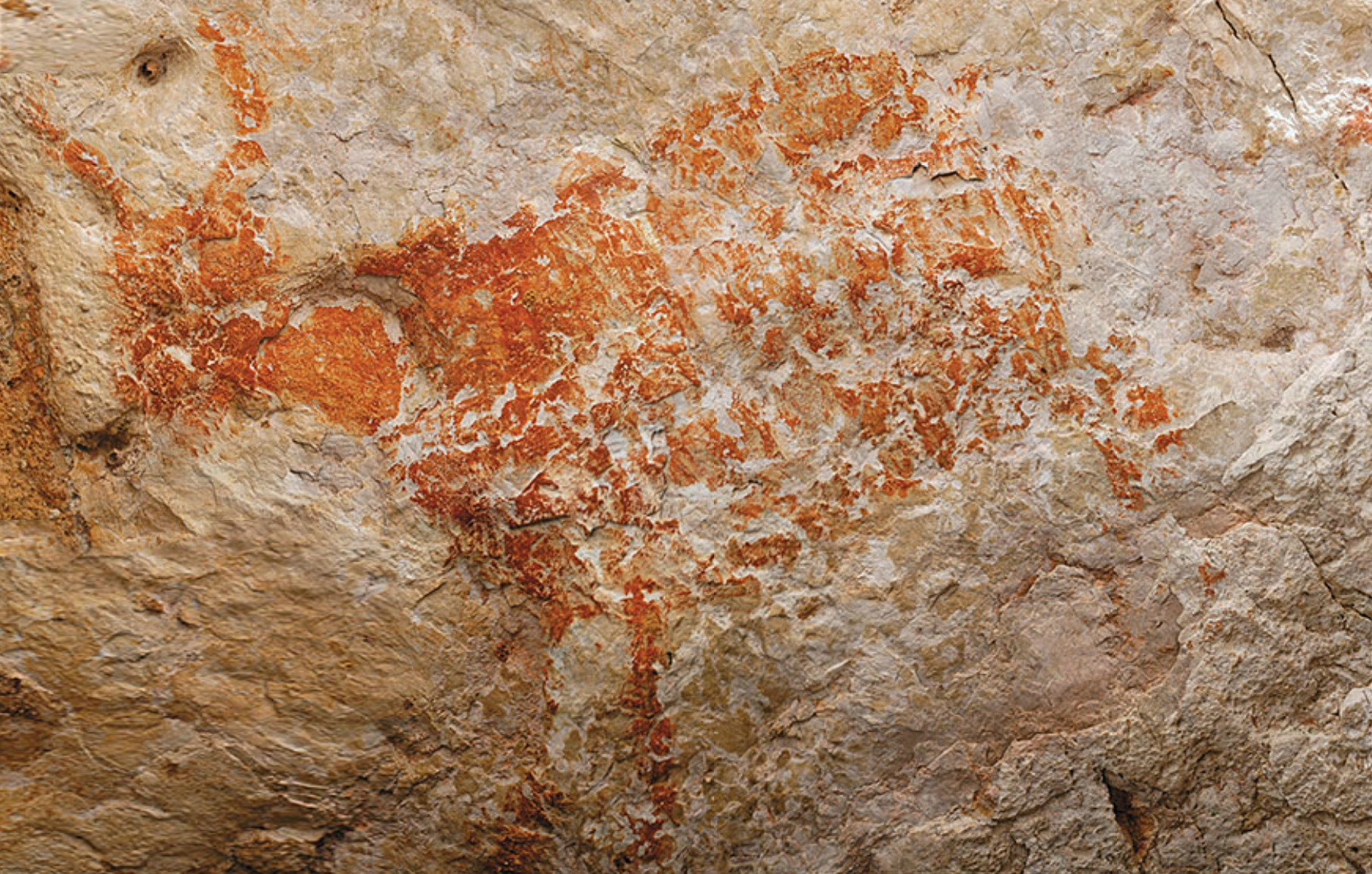
One of the oldest known figurative paintings, a depiction of an unknown bovine, was discovered in the Lubang Jeriji Saléh cave and dated to be more than 40,000 (perhaps as old as 52,000) years old.

Symbolic behavior is, perhaps, one of the most difficult aspects of modern human behavior to distinguish archaeologically. When searching for evidence of symbolic behavior in the MSA, there are three lines of evidence that can be considered: direct evidence reflecting concrete examples of symbols; indirect evidence reflecting behaviors that would have been used to convey symbolic thought; and technological evidence reflecting the tools and skills that would have been used to produce art. Direct evidence is difficult to find beyond 40ka, and indirect evidence is essentially intangible, thus technological evidence is the most fruitful of the three.

Today there is widespread agreement among archaeologists that the world's first art and symbolic culture dates to the African Middle Stone Age. Some of the most striking artifacts, including engraved pieces of red ochre, were manufactured at Blombos Cave in South Africa 75,000 years ago. Pierced and ochred Nassarius shell beads were also recovered from Blombos, with even earlier examples (Middle Stone Age, Aterian) from the Taforalt Caves. In addition, ostrich egg shell containers engraved with geometric designs dating to 60,000 years ago were found at Diepkloof, South Africa, beads and other personal ornamentation have been found from Morocco which might be as much as 130,000 years old, and the Cave of Hearths in South Africa has yielded a number of beads dating from significantly prior to 50,000 years ago. At Panga ya Saidi in Kenya, marine shell beads appear perhaps as early as 67,000 years ago and certainly by 33,000 years ago, and engraved ochre by 48,500 years ago. Evidence for the making of paints by a complex process also exists dating to 100,000 years ago in South Africa, and for the use of pigments in Kenya dating to about 320,000 years ago.

=== Complex cognition ===
A series of innovations have been documented by 170–160,000 years ago at the site of Pinnacle Point 13B on the southern Cape coast of South Africa. This includes the oldest confirmed evidence for the utilization of ochre and marine resources in the form of shellfish exploitation for food. Based on his analysis of the MSA bovid assemblage at Klasies, Milo reports MSA people were formidable hunters and that their social behavior patterns approached those of modern humans. Deacon maintains that the management of plant food resources through deliberate burning of the veld to encourage the growth of plants with corms or tubers in the southern Cape during the Howiesons Poort (c. 70–55 ka) is indicative of modern human behavior. A family basis to foraging groups, color symbolism and the reciprocal exchange of artifacts and the formal organization of living space are, he suggests, further evidence for modernity in the MSA.

Lyn Wadley et al. have argued that the complexity of the skill needed to process the heat-treated compound glue (gum and red ochre) used to haft spears would seem to argue for continuity between modern human cognition and that of humans 70,000 BP at Sibudu Cave.

In 2008, an ochre processing workshop likely for the production of paints was uncovered dating to ca. 100,000 years ago at Blombos Cave, South Africa. Analysis shows that a liquefied pigment-rich mixture was produced and stored in the two abalone shells, and that ochre, bone, charcoal, grindstones and hammer-stones also formed a composite part of the toolkits. Evidence for the complexity of the task includes procuring and combining raw materials from various sources (implying they had a mental template of the process they would follow), possibly using pyrotechnology to facilitate fat extraction from bone, using a probable recipe to produce the compound, and the use of shell containers for mixing and storage for later use.

=== Evidence for language ===
Ochre is reported from some early MSA sites, for example at Kapthurin and Twin Rivers, and is common after c. 100 ka. Barham argues that even if some of this ochre was used in a symbolic, color-related role then this abstraction could not have worked without language. Ochre, he suggests, could be one proxy for trying to find the emergence of language.

Formal bone tools are frequently associated with modern behaviour by archaeologists. Sophisticated bone harpoons manufactured at Katanda, West Africa at c. 90 ka and bone tools from Blombos Cave dated at c. 77 ka may then also serve as examples of material culture associated with modern language.

Language has been suggested to be necessary to maintain exchange networks. Evidence of some form of exchange networks during the Middle Stone Age is presented in Marwick (2003) in which the distance between the source of raw material and location in which a stone artifact was found was compared throughout sites containing early stone artifacts. Five Middle Stone Age sites contained distances between 140 and 340 km and have been interpreted, when compared with ethnographic data, that these distances were made possible through exchange networks. Barham also views syntactic language as one aspect of behavior that in fact allowed MSA people to settle in the tropical forest environments of what is now the Democratic Republic of the Congo.

Many authors have speculated that at the core of this symbolic explosion, and in tandem, was the development of syntactic language that evolved through a highly specialized social learning system providing the means for semantically unbounded discourse. Syntax would have played a key role in this process and its full adoption could have been a crucial element of the symbolic behavioral package in the MSA.

== Brain change ==
Although the advent of anatomical physical modernity cannot confidently be linked with palaeoneurological change, it does seem probable that hominid brains evolved through the same selection processes as other body parts. Genes that promoted a capacity for symbolism may have been selected for, suggesting that the foundations for symbolic culture may well be grounded in biology. However, behavior that was mediated by symbolism may have only come later, even though this physical capacity was already in place much earlier. Skoyles and Sagan, for example, argue that human brain expansion by increasing the prefrontal cortex would have created a brain capable of symbolizing its previously non-symbolic cognition, and that this process, slow to begin with, increasingly accelerated during the last 100,000 years. Symbolically mediated behavior may then feed back upon this process by creating a greater ability to manufacture symbolic artifacts and social networks. According to the research team in Jebel Irhoud, the discovery means that Homo sapiens—not members of a rival or ancestor species (Homo heidelbergensis, Homo naledi)—were the ones who left behind Middle Stone Age hand tools that have since been unearthed all over Africa.

== Sites ==
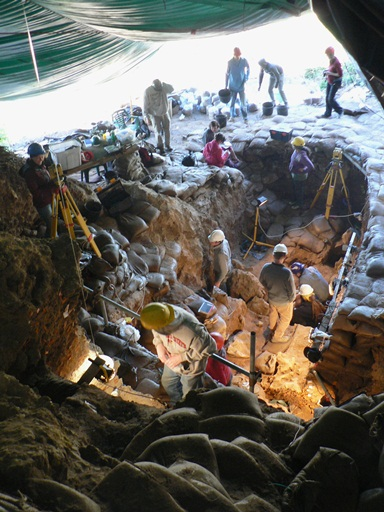
Excavations at Pinnacle Point, South Africa

Numerous sites in southern Africa reflect the four characteristics of behavioral modernity. Blombos Cave, South Africa contains personal ornaments and what are presumed to be the tools used for the production of artistic imagery, as well as bone tools. Still Bay and Howieson's Poort contain variable tool technologies. These different types of assemblages allow researchers to extrapolate behaviors that would likely be associated with such technologies, such as shifts in foraging behaviors, which are further supported by faunal data at these sites.

- Blombos Cave, South Africa
- Klasies River Caves, South Africa
- Sibudu Cave, South Africa
- Diepkloof Rock Shelter, South Africa
- Pinnacle Point, South Africa
- Border Cave, South Africa
- Bambata Cave, South Africa
- Mossel Bay, South Africa
- Mumba Cave, Tanzania
- Mumbwa Caves, Zambia
- Laminia and Saxomununya, Senegal

== See also ==
- Out of Africa hypothesis
- Symbolic culture
- Cognitive revolution
- Later Stone Age
