= Hyperprosociality =

Extreme altruistic behaviour

Hyperprosociality is extremely altruistic behavior towards unrelated individuals that has been described as a trait unique to Homo sapiens.

== Definition ==
The term was introduced in 2015 by Curtis Marean as "extremely cooperative behavior with unrelated individuals, often for the benefit of others or society without expectation of payoff". Although originating from an evolutionary anthropological perspective, hyperprosociality has been utilized in modern pedagogy and psychology.

== Perspectives ==
=== Archeological and anthropological perspective ===
The high level of cooperation utilized by modern Homo sapiens is unique to our species. It has been argued that this must have evolutionary origins. Explanations for our level of hyperprosociality vary, from food and hunting to cooperative breeding. To keep a gene pool diverse, interchanges between human tribes must have taken place, requiring stronger relationships. Similarly, warfare had the potential to unite some groups and create far-reaching social bonds that connected tribes. Apart from uniting to be able to stand stronger against other enemies, strategies and culture were shared as well. ‘willingness to take mortal risks as a fighter is not the only form of altruism that contributes to prevailing in intergroup contests; more altruistic and hence more cooperative groups may be more productive and sustain healthier, stronger, or more numerous members, for example, or make more effective use of information.’

It remains unclear whether one of the mentioned origins is the driving one. It is clear, however, that extreme social behaviors are from other kinds of different cultures. Hyperprosociality does not make groups interwoven to a set extend. It can come in many degrees, depending on the setting. The only clear distinction that can be made is the difference between basic sociality and far-reaching hyperprosociality, sometimes altruistic behavior. At the most basic level of sociality, we take care of our sick, injured, old, and share food. However, these tight family groups are unable to function solely on their own. It was necessary to form more complex social relationships, also known as ethnolinguistic groups, which function to organize outgroup marriages, warfare, trade, etc. Ultimately these higher hyperprosocial relationships provide greater security.

=== Pedagogical perspective ===
The idea of hyperprosociality has also been mentioned in the scientific domain of pedagogy. Namely, Atkinson and Shvidkos argue that learning a second language is more than ‘observation, imitation, and trial-and-error alone’. Thus, this cannot merely be done in a classroom. The complexity in cultural-language is also found in its physical movements, mimics, and gestures. Even though Spanish, for example, is spoken in many different countries, different cultures carry different movements that enhance communication. These gestures often reach further than languages and form connections between tribes. Learning to understand each other was a mutual conversation and a dynamic teaching-learning experience forgotten in our modern-day classrooms.

=== Psychological perspective ===
The term hyperprosociality does not occur often in the field of psychology, but it is still of great importance. The foundational work by Roy F. Baumeister gives an overview of the different reasons why humans have developed a complex culture and communication. Psychologists are divided; some accept that culture and brain development are evolutionary by-products while others point at our human nature. If one sees humans as brutal by nature, society is a corruption created by the need. If one sees human nature based in fear due to the consciousness of our mortality, culture has the function to distract us and gives us a sense of security.

Psychologists see culture as the basis of hyperprosocial behavior; we help others because we can connect through culture. However, Anthropologists see culture as a factor of influence to the extent of hyper-social behavior. Culture is a by-effect of the willingness of humans to help others.
