= Gademotta =

Coordinates: 7°57′N 38°38′E

The Gademotta Formation in the Main Ethiopian Rift Valley is known for its Middle Stone Age archaeological sites. It is located west of Lake Ziway. In addition to the type-site, which assumes the same name, the formation contains a cluster of sites at Kulkuletti, some 2.5 kilometres (1.6 mi) away. The near-lake environment and locally available obsidian may have attracted the continuous/repeated occupation of the area by Middle and Late Pleistocene hominins.

The Gademotta Formation site-complex was discovered in the early 1970s by a team of researchers under the leadership of Fred Wendorf and Romuald Schild. This team conducted several excavations in 1972 and 1973, recovering tens of thousands of stone artifacts. Renewed research in the Gademotta Formation was encouraged by new techniques that allowed for a more precise 40Ar/39Ar age of the site published in 2008.

An age of over 279,000 years old is published for the oldest Middle Stone Age site in the Formation. Although similar in age with the oldest Middle Stone Age site in the Kapthurin Formation, Kenya, the oldest occupation at Gademotta is characterized by technological elements that are exclusively attributable to the Middle Stone Age. Stone-tipped throwing spears of that age have been studied.
