= Kadanuumuu =

Hominin fossil

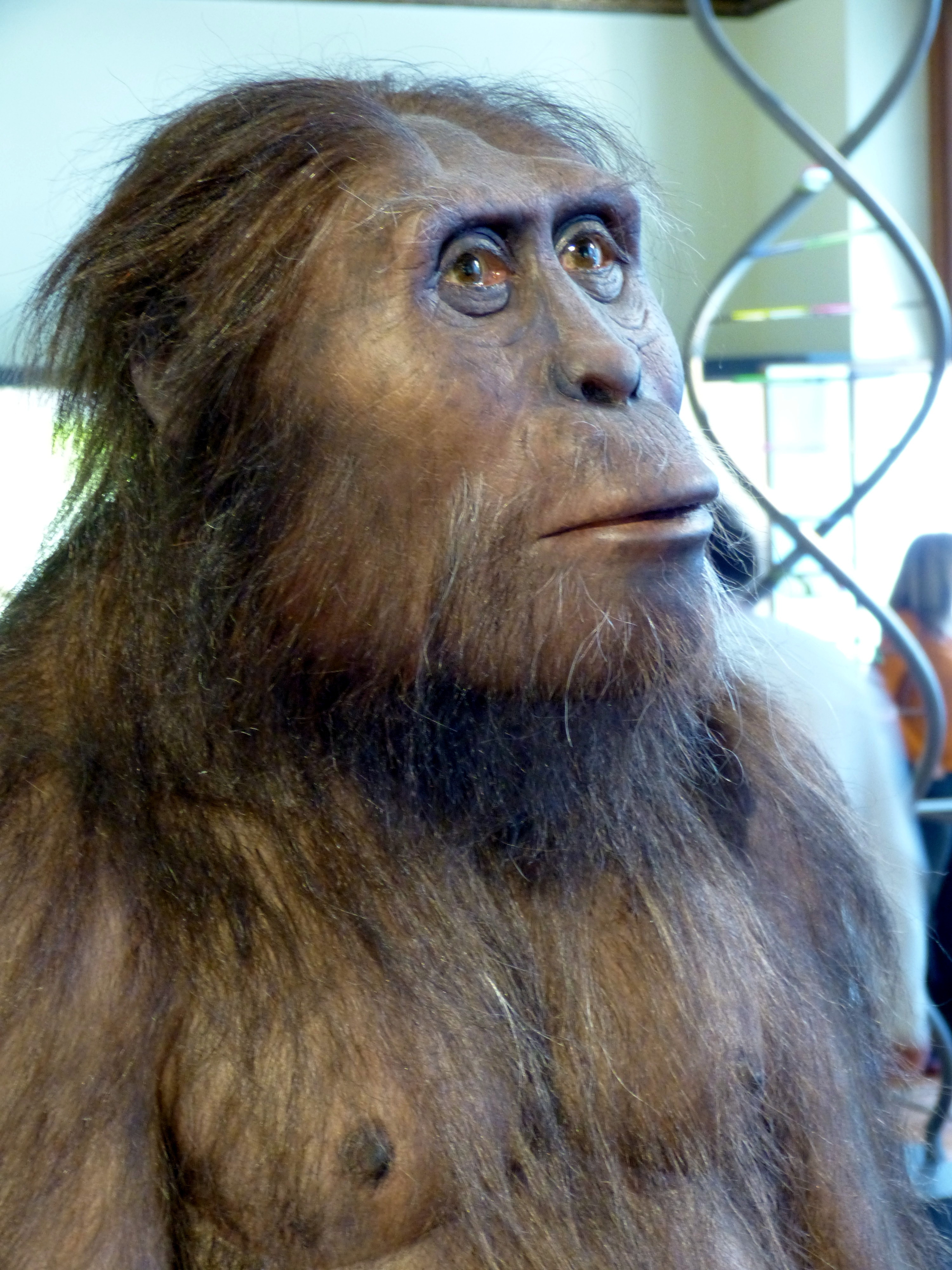
Model of a male A. afarensis

Kadanuumuu ("Big Man" in the Afar language) is the nickname of KSD-VP-1/1, a 3.58-million-year-old partial Australopithecus afarensis fossil discovered in the Afar Region of Ethiopia in 2005 by a team led by Yohannes Haile-Selassie, then a curator of physical anthropology at the Cleveland Museum of Natural History. Based on skeletal analysis, the fossil is believed to conclusively show that the species was fully bipedal.

Kudanuumuu is a roughly 40% complete skeleton, consisting of parts of the limbs, a scapula, collarbone, ribs, neck vertebrae, and a pelvis. Its discovery marked the first time that these bones were found together in an individual adult Au. afarensis.

At more than 5 feet (152 cm) in stature, Kadanuumuu is much taller than the famous Lucy fossil of the same species discovered in the 1970s, and is approximately 400,000 years older. Among other characteristics, Kadanuumuu's scapula, the oldest discovered to date for a hominid, is comparable to that of modern humans, suggesting that the species was land rather than tree-based. Other traits, such as its long legs and human-like proportions, point to bipedal motion similar to modern humans. This would mean that, although it was assumed based on Lucy's skeleton that Au. afarensis knuckle-walked like modern non-human apes, the species may have actually adapted to fully upright walking 3.6 million years ago. This theory is aided by other discoveries like the Laetoli footprints, which have been linked to Kadanuumuu-era Au. afarensis. However, not all researchers agree with this conclusion.

== See also ==
- Dawn of Humanity
