= Institute of Human Origins =

Research institute based at Arizona State University

- Founded: 1981; 45 years ago
- Founder: Donald Johanson
- Type: Non-profit
- Purpose: Multiregional origin of modern humans, Human Evolution
- Headquarters: Tempe, Arizona
- Origins: Berkeley, California
- Key people: Yohannes Haile-Selassie (Director); Curtis Marean (Associate Director); David Koch (Executive Board); Ian Tattersall (Executive Board)
- Website: iho.asu.edu

The Institute of Human Origins (IHO) is a non-profit, multidisciplinary research organization dedicated to the recovery and analysis of the fossil evidence for human evolution. It was founded by the team of paleoanthropologists that discovered Lucy, and became affiliated with Arizona State University in 1997. In 2014, IHO received the single largest grant dedicated to the research of human origins.

== Origins ==
After finding Lucy during the "surge of discoveries" in the 1970s, Donald Johanson returned to Berkeley, California and founded the Institute of Human Origins with the mission of bridging social, earth, and life science approaches to the most important questions concerning the course, causes, and timing of events in the human career over deep time.

== Research and discoveries ==
=== Fossil record of the earliest human evolution ===
Ledi-Geraru is one of IHO's fieldwork sites in the fossil-rich Afar Region of Ethiopia. In 2013, graduate student Chalachew Seyoum discovered the lower mandible known as LD 350-1, the oldest fossil from the human genus, Homo. The discovery pushed back evidence of the human genus, Homo, to 2.8 million years, ago, nearly a half-million years earlier than previously known.

Ongoing IHO field work in Hadar, Ethiopia, where Lucy was found in 1974, addresses the evolution and ecology of Australopithecus (3.0–3.4 million years ago) and the origin of Homo and stone-tool making (2.3 million years ago). In 2007, the field project opened ASU's Hadar Field School, which educates American study abroad students in field methods in human origins research.

=== Emergence of modern humans in Africa ===
Since joining IHO in 2001, Curtis Marean has directed the organization's Pinnacle Point fieldwork, which is working to produce and integrate a climate, environment, and paleoanthropological sequence for the final stage in human evolution. The focus of the Pinnacle Point excavations has been at Cave 13B (PP13B), where the fieldwork team has discovered early evidence of symbolic behavior. In 2009, the examination of worked silcrete stone from Pinnacle Point indicated that it was heat-treated, and is the oldest known example of such technology. Pinnacle Point also represents the oldest known occurrence of human consumption of shellfish, as well as an early use of ochre. These features indicate a sophisticated level of modern behaviors that had previously been associated with Upper Paleolithic of Europe. The discoveries here are key pieces of evidence supporting the early florescence of modern human behaviors in Africa.

=== Evolutionary foundations of human uniqueness ===
The IHO Templeton Research Program is a collaborative inquiry into the evolutionary foundations of human uniqueness. The $4.9 million, three-year grant from the John Templeton Foundation is the largest of its type for human origins research, and will support 11 linked investigations of where, when, and how unique human capacities for complex cognition, cumulative culture, and large-scale cooperation emerged.

== Current Faculty ==
- Yohannes Haile-Selassie (Director)
- Donald Johanson (Founding Director)
- Carlos Eduardo G. Amorim
- Robert Boyd
- Christopher Campisano
- Helen Elizabeth Davis
- Ian Gilby
- Kim Hill
- Kevin Langergraber
- Curtis Marean
- Sarah Mathew
- Thomas Morgan
- Charles Perreault
- Kathryn Ranhorn
- Kaye Reed
- Gary Schwartz
- Joan Silk
- Anne Stone
- Denise Su

Two IHO faculty are members of the National Academy of Sciences: Joan Silk and Anne Stone

== Institute of Human Origins Research Council ==
Alexander Barbanell | Charles Brickman | Colleen Cookson | Robert Cookson | David Deniger | Martin Dobelle | Molly Dobelle | John Ellerman | Alejandra Escandon | Jay Greene | Thomas F. Hill | Donald Johanson | Thomas P. Jones III | Patrick Kenney | Bobby Ellen Kimbel | William Kimbel | David Koch | Ross Leventhal | Curtis Marean | Carolyn Lee (Susie) Marston | Rand Morimoto | Harry A. Papp | Arthur L. Pearce II | Herb Roskind | Laura Rosskind | Janet D. Sands | Edgar L. Sands | Peter Saucier | Carol Saucier | Bruce W. Schnitzer | Ridge Smidt | Ian Tattersall | Joan Travis | Sander van der Leeuw
