= Kathu Archaeological Complex =

The Kathu Archaeological Complex is a cluster of significant archaeological, principally Stone Age, exposures situated in and near Kathu, a mining town in the Northern Cape Province, South Africa. The sites include a suite of sinkhole exposures, the Kathu Pan sites, north west of the town, the immensely rich spread of artefacts at what is referred to as Kathu Townlands on the eastern side of Kathu (now surrounded by urban development), and surface and subsurface horizons including handaxes on farms further eastward. These are subject to on-going archaeological research.

== Kathu Pan ==
At Kathu Pan, north west of the town, evidence of early hominin occupation has been observed at multiple sinkhole sites within the pan. The locality known as Kathu Pan 1 has Earlier Stone Age deposits (Stratum 4b) characterised by well-made handaxes. Above it, Stratum 4a is dated by a combination of OSL and ESR/U-series dating to circa 500 000 years Before Present. The stone artifact assemblage from Stratum 4a is characterized by a prepared core technology that produced both blades and points, and has been attributed to the Fauresmith industry.

In a paper published in Science in November 2012, Jayne Wilkins and colleagues reveal evidence of 500 000 year-old stone points (excavated by Peter Beaumont in 1979-1982), argued to represent the earliest stone-tipped spears yet found. This conclusion, based partly on experimental comparison of use wear, is taken to indicate that human ancestors used stone-tipped weapons for hunting 200 000 years earlier than previously thought. Wilkins is quoted as saying that "the find does more than simply extend the prehistory of stone-tipped spears – it puts those first spears firmly in the hands of Homo heidelbergensis. Modern foragers use such tools to take down large game as part of cooperative, strategic hunts. Perhaps our ancestor did so too."
