= Pinnacle Point =

Small promontory south of Mossel Bay, South Africa

- Location within Western Cape
- Location: Mossel Bay, Western Cape Province
- Coordinates: 34°12′28″S 22°05′22″E

UNESCO World Heritage Site
- Official name: Pinnacle Point Site Complex
- Part of: The Emergence of Modern Human Behaviour: The Pleistocene Occupation Sites of South Africa
- Criteria: Cultural: iii, iv, v
- Inscription: 2024 (46th Session)

Pinnacle Point is a small promontory immediately south of Mossel Bay, a town on the southern coast of South Africa. Excavations since the year 2000 of a series of caves at Pinnacle Point, first recognized and documented in 1997 by South African professional archaeologists, Jonathan Kaplan and Peter Nilssen, have revealed occupation by Middle Stone Age people between 170,000 and 40,000 years ago. The focus of excavations has been at Cave 13B (PP13B), where the earliest evidence for the systematic exploitation of marine resources (shellfish) and symbolic behaviour has been documented, and at Pinnacle Point Cave 5–6 (PP5–6), where the oldest evidence for the heat treatment of rock to make stone tools has been documented. The only human remains have been recovered from younger deposits at PP13B which are c. 100,000 years old.

In 2024, the Pinnacle Point Site Complex became a part of the World Heritage Site of Pleistocene Occupation Sites of South Africa.

== History of the research ==
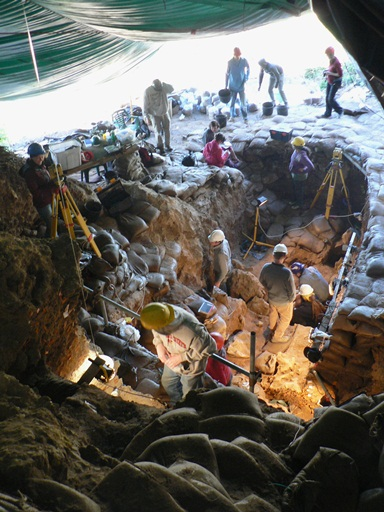
Excavations in progress in one of the Pinnacle Point Caves, 2011

After the initial recognition and documentation of the sites by Kaplan and Nilssen in 1997, Nilssen from Iziko South African Museum introduced the sites to Curtis Marean in 1999 after which they co-directed excavations for several years. The discoveries at Pinnacle Point have been made by an international team, headed by palaeoanthropologist Curtis Marean from the Institute of Human Origins of the Arizona State University as well as researchers from South Africa (UCT and Iziko South African Museum), Australia (Archaeology Program, La Trobe University, UoW), Israel, and France.

After debating for decades, paleoanthropologists now agree there is enough genetic and fossil evidence to suggest that Homo sapiens evolved in Africa c. 200,000 – c. 160,000 years ago. At that time, the world was in an ice age, and Africa was dry and arid. As archaeological sites dating to that time period are rare in Africa, palaeontologist Curtis Marean analysed geologic formations, sea currents, and climate data to pinpoint likely archaeological sites; one such was Pinnacle Point.

== Pinnacle Point 13B and its implications for modern behaviour ==
At PP13B, the evidence for symbolic behaviour comes in the form of scraped and ground ochre (usually referred to as limonite bearing powders) that may have been used to form a pigment for body painting. This is similar to more complex ochre utilisation known from Blombos Cave slightly farther to the west at roughly 70,000 years ago. These discoveries contradict the classical hypothesis that the modern behaviour emerged only 40,000 years ago and was reached through a "large cultural leap". The harsh climate and reduced food resources may have been why people moved to the shore at Pinnacle Point, where they could eat marine creatures like shellfish, whale, and seal.

Also at PP13B are an anomalous quantity of dicotyledonous tree leaf phytoliths in sediments that are roughly 90,000 years old. Though alteration of phytoliths introduce uncertainty to these findings, the quantity of tree phytoliths relative to grass phytoliths has been suggested to indicate a history of wood burning in hearths.

== Provincial heritage site ==
On 14 December 2012, the provincial heritage resources authority Heritage Western Cape declared Pinnacle Point a provincial heritage site in the terms of Section 27 of the National Heritage Resources Act. This provides the site with the highest form of protection under South African heritage law.

In 2015, the South African government submitted a proposal to add the cave to the list of World Heritage Sites and it has been placed on the UNESCO list of tentative sites as a potential future 'serial nomination' together with Blombos Cave, Sibudu Cave, Klasies River Caves, Border Cave, and Diepkloof Rock Shelter. Three of the sites gained the World Heritage Status in 2024.

== See also ==
- Hominid evolution
