= Kapthurin Formation =

Pleistocene geological formation in East Africa

- Stratigraphic range: Middle Pleistocene, 0.61–0.23 Ma (See geochronology)
- Type: Geological formation
- Unit of: Tugen Hills Sequence
- Sub-units: See stratigraphy
- Underlies: Kokwob (Loboi) Formation
- Overlies: Chemeron Formation
- Thickness: ~125 m

Lithology
- Primary: Silt, gravel
- Other: Basalt, tuff, trachyte, conglomerate, tufa

Location
- Location: Great Rift Valley, Kenya
- Coordinates: 0.31°N 35.58°E
- Extent: ~150 km^{2}
- Kapthurin Formation outcrop W of Lake Baringo

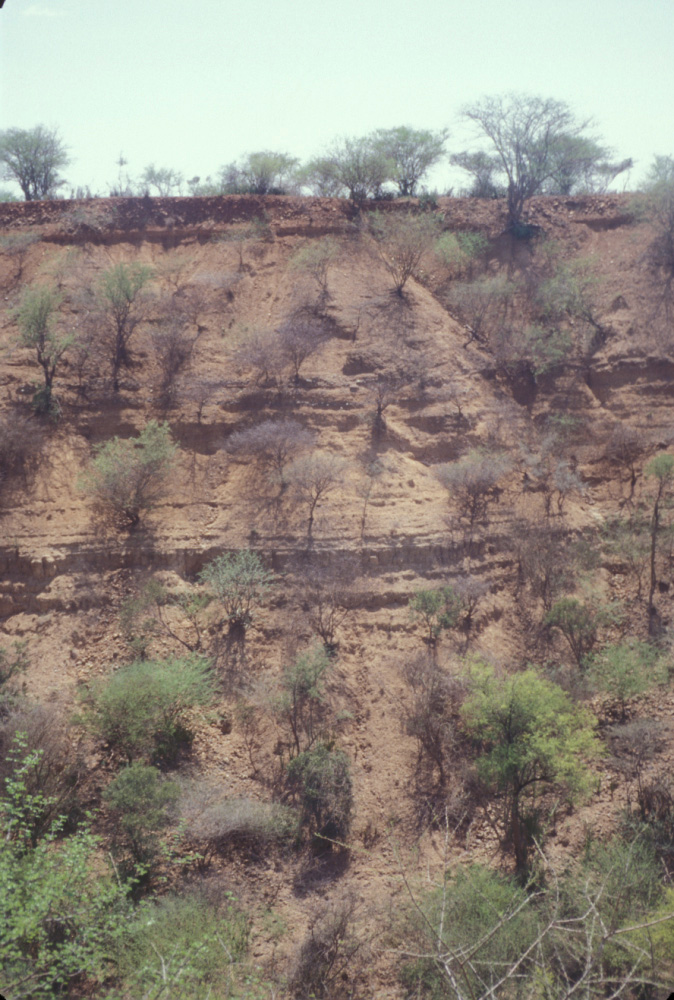
Tephra and intercalated fluvial sediments of the Bedded Tuff Member (see stratigraphy) exposed in the Ndau River.

The Kapthurin Formation is a series of Middle Pleistocene sediments associated with the East African Rift Valley. Part of the East African Rift System, it is also an important archaeological site in the study of early humans who occupied the area and left stone tools and animal bones behind. It outcrops in Kenya west of Lake Bogoria and northwest of Lake Baringo in the Kenya Rift Valley, exposed on the surface in a 150 km^{2} (58 sq mi) area. It also outcrops in portions of the Tugen Hills farther east. The ~125 metres (410 ft) of sediment that comprises the Kapthurin formation represents more than 600,000 years of depositional history. Clastic sediments, tuffs, and carbonate beds, in the Kapthurin give information on past river and lake environments. Additionally, intercalated tuffs and extrusive igneous rocks associated with Rift Valley volcanic activity have allowed for multiple argon–argon dating studies. The high resolution dating enables archaeological studies regarding changing hominin behavior. The Kapthurin Formation has been used to study the Acheulian-Middle Stone Age transition.

== Geology ==
=== Geologic context ===
The Kapthurin is on the floor of the basin of a half-graben that forms the Kenya Rift. This is one of two half-grabens in the Eastern portion of the East Africa Rift Valley. Because of nearby North-South striking normal faults that form this half-graben, the Kapthurin and other sedimentary formations are on a fault block tiled to the West. The formation contains lacustrine, fluvial, and volcanic rocks (specifically basalts and trachytes). Generally, clastic sediments dominate the formation, but evidence of volcanic activity from tuffs and rocks representing lava flows are found throughout.

=== Stratigraphy ===
The Kapthurin overlies the Chemeron Formation, dated to roughly 1.57 million years ago, unconformably. The bulk Kapthurin formation has been dated to the Middle Pleistocene based on fossil evidence. An idealized stratigraphic characterization divides the formation into five members, listed here in descending order with their geologic abbreviations and intercalated tuffs and lava flows (also in descending order).
K5) Upper Silts and Gravels
K4) The Bedded Tuff
K3) Middle Silts and Gravels
* Gray Tuff
* Upper Kasurein Basalt
K2) Pumice Tuff
K1) Lower Silts and Gravels
* Lower Kasurein Basalt

The Kokwob formation (also called the Loboi Formation) overlies the Kapthurin unconformably, with sediments being of Holocene or Late Pleistocene Age. These sediments represent the present day erosional activity and deposition. Stratigraphically, a major faulting episode separates the Kapthurin and Kokwob. Dating of the Kapthurin formation's members is described in the following section. Localized faulting is common in this outcrop, and the stratigraphy described here is not representative of every Kapthurin outcrop.

=== Geochronology ===
As a lower bound on the age of the Kapthurin, Chemeron Formation has been dated to 1.57 million years ago from Potassium-Argon dating of basaltic rocks. However, the most recent radiometric date in the oldest members of the Kapthurin is ~610,000 years old. Other radiometric dates and paleomagnetic geochronology of tuffs also suggest that the Kapthurin is less than 700,000 years old. The unconformity between the Chemeron and Kapthurin likely represents a significant gap in the geologic record, then. The majority of radiometric dates in the Kapthurin are Argon-Argon dates from Tuffs (described below), The Upper (deposited 537,000-567,000 years ago) and Lower Kasurein Basalts (deposited 650,000-570,00 years ago), and a Trachyte (deposited 542,000-548,000 years ago).

==== Notable tuff deposits ====
The Kapthurin preserves information from volcanic eruptions in consolidated ash, of tuff. While tuff deposits vary with outcrop location and there are smaller tuff beds in members primarily categorized as silt or gravel, there are three well-researched tuff deposits within the Kapthurin.

The oldest is the Pumice Tuff deposit. It was initially dated to 600,000-800,000 years ago by radiometric dating of sanidine in the bed, however, paleomagnetic data indicates that the bed deposited prior to 700,00 years ago. More recent Argon-Argon dating techniques suggest that this tuff is instead 542,000–548,000 years old.

The Grey Tuff, which is 500,00-518,000 years old, deposited well after the pumice tuff. It follows the deposition of lake sediments and basalts. Notably, in certain Kapthurin formation outcrops, the Grey Tuff overlies hominin remains, making it an important bed for relative dating. Additionally, the Grey Tuff underlies archaeological sites with evidence of tool industry transitions.

The Bedded Tuff contains tools from Middle Stone Age and Acheulean tool industries. With the Grey Tuff, Argon-Argon dating brackets several sites associated with hominin activity around the time Homo Sapiens evolved. It consists of three geochemically distinct mafic tuffs, defined as Lower, Upper, and Evolved tuffs based on their magnesium oxide content and listed here from oldest to youngest, stratigraphically. In addition, the Bedded Tuff has two more felsic tuffs, the Koimolot Tuff (between the Upper and Evolved basaltic tuffs) and the Pumiceous Trachytic Tuff (overlying the Evolved Basaltic tuff). Only the latter has been radiometrically dated due to high sanidine content for argon-argon dating, with a wide range of deposition dates from ~233,000-296,000 years old. Still, the fact that Middle Stone Age tools have been found beneath the Pumiceous Trachytic Tuff member confirms this industry's appearance in this region of Africa prior to any other location. Detailed chronology of the bedded tuff member also enables an in depth look at the gradual transition from the Acheulean to the Middle Stone Age tool industries (see Archaeology: Tool Production).

=== Paleoenvironment ===
Geologic evidence in the Kapthurin reveals a dynamic freshwater environment in this area during the Middle Pleistocene. Coarsely-bedded conglomerates record evidence of flash floods, and the Bedded Tuff might represent ash fall into a lake environment, creating thin, well-defined layers.

Detailed evidence of environmental change is seen in a series of three tufa carbonate beds spanning 1–2 metres (3 ft 3 in – 6 ft 7 in) in the Middle Salts and Gravels beneath the Upper Kasurein Basalt in the Lake Baringo Kapthurin outcrops. Together, they represent freshwater environmental changes that occurred in the basin ~500,000 years ago. Sediment below the carbonates indicates a fluvial environment, whereas sediment above the series represent a lacustrine environment.

The first of the three tufa carbonate layers represents a shallow lake environment fed by groundwater through cracked rocks, as evidenced by their high Magnesium content and interpretations of high water temperature via oxygen isotopes. Subsequent carbonate beds represent deeper, open lake environments. Fossil evidence and associated elevated strontium levels in the 2nd and 3rd carbonate beds shows how the later lakes sustained more life and had a consistent freshwater source. This could have been a spring source in either the Tugen Hills to the East, or a paleoclimatic change leading to increasing rainfall, per current hypotheses.

Lastly, each of the tufa three beds, from bottom to top, progresses from a spongy texture to a dense crystalline cap. Each tufa bed is also overlain by either a thin clay layer or paleosol. Alongside a heavy oxygen isotope signature in the paleosols that suggests high evaporation, this change in texture indicates cyclical changes in water level. At its maximum, the lake would have covered about 1 km^{2} (0.39 sq mi).

While the changing environment would have impacted early hominin movements and resource exploitation, more research is required to understand the relationship between water level, resource availability, and hominin activity.

== Archaeology ==
=== Lithic analysis ===
The Kapthurin Formation contains the oldest evidence of blade production, or the repeated manufacture of blades from a single larger stone core, dating to ~500,000 years ago. This is 150,000 years older than the earliest evidence for blade production in Europe. Specifically, within the Kapthurin Formation outcrop west of Lake Baringo, Kenya, archaeologists have found tools from the Acheulean industry, characterized by large cutting tools such as hand axes in addition to flaking.

In sediment over 285,000 years old, Acheulean tools are interstratified with what is considered Middle Stone Age (300-250,000 years old) technology. Levallois point technology, which is typically characterized as a Middle Stone Age phenomenon, appears among Acheulean tools beneath Upper Basaltic Tuff in the Bedded Tuff Member of the Kapthurin. Levallois flakes also appear below this tuff at the Acheulian-dominated "Leakey Handaxe Area." From this interstratification, archaeologists conclude that there was a gradual transition from Acheulean to Middle Stone Age technology than began roughly 280,000 years ago. During and after the transition, regional differences between tools present an even more complex picture. In particular, at sites where they are interstratified with Acheulean tools, Levallois points and flakes do coexist.

Middle Stone Age technology is associated with anatomically modern Homo Sapiens. The gradual transition and regionally differentiated tools suggest a "long term evolutionary process". The departure from the long-standing Acheulean industry may also link to environmental changes in the freshwater spring environment that existed more than 500,000 years ago near present day Lake Baringo as well.

=== Ochre ===
Argon–argon dating of volcanic ash overlying ochre fragments found there has dated what may represent some of the earliest human aesthetic sensibility to 285,000 years ago. The ochre fragments must have been brought to the site by human agency and may have been used as body adornment.
