= Curtis Marean =

American professor of archaeology

Curtis W. Marean is a professor of archaeology at Arizona State University.

In a 2010 article in Scientific American, Marean explained how anatomically modern humans survived the MIS 6 glacial stage 195–123 thousand years ago, a period during which the human population was limited to only a few hundreds breeding individuals. During this period, sea levels dropped more than a hundred meters and the sloping South African Agulhas Bank was transformed into a plain on which humans could survive on shellfish and wash-ups from the sea.

He is currently the associate director of the Institute of Human Origins in Tempe, Arizona.

== See also ==
- Pinnacle Point
