= William Kimbel =

American paleontologist (1954–2022)

- Born: April 15, 1954; Philadelphia, Pennsylvania, U.S.
- Died: April 17, 2022 (aged 68); Phoenix, Arizona, U.S.
- Other name: Bill
- Education: Kent State University
- Known for: Hominid evolution
- Spouse: Patricia Sannit
- Awards: Fellow, American Association for the Advancement of Science (2005)
- Scientific career
- Fields: Paleoanthropology Paleontology
- Workplaces: Arizona State University
- Thesis: (1986)
- Academic advisors: Donald Johanson, Owen Lovejoy (anthropologist)

William "Bill" Kimbel (April 15, 1954 – April 17, 2022) was a paleoanthropologist specializing in Plio-Pleistocene hominid evolution in Africa. He had a multi-decade career at Arizona State University, first as a professor in the Anthropology Department and then as the Director of the Institute of Human Origins and Virginia M. Ullman Professor of Natural History and the Environment in the School of Human Evolution and Social Change.

== Career ==
Kimbel obtained his PhD from Kent State University, and served as Associate Curator and Head of Physical Anthropology at the Cleveland Museum of Natural History from 1981 to 1985. In 1985, he began work for the Institute of Human Origins in Berkeley, California, under the leadership of prominent physical anthropologist Donald Johanson, and later had a long career at Arizona State University. There, following Johanson's retirement, he became Director of the relocated Institute of Human Origins and served as Virginia M. Ullman Professor of Natural History and the Environment in the School of Human Evolution and Social Change. He was an editor at the Journal of Human Evolution from 2003 to 2008.

Kimbel was well known for leading paleoanthropological fieldwork, including at the Hadar hominin site in the Afar Region, Ethiopia, from which he described many important fossil discoveries. These included one of the earliest specimens of the genus Homo. He often encouraged students and early career researchers to join him in the field, and used his experience in the Afar to offer a hands-on educational experience at the Hadar Field School. He also worked on other famous paleoanthropological sites including Olduvai Gorge, Tanzania, and Amud Cave, Israel.

== Expertise ==
Kimbel's expertise centered on hominin evolution in Africa during the Pliocene and Pleistocene. He published widely on topics including Australopithecus skull morphology and biological systematics.
