= Levallois technique =

Distinctive type of stone knapping technique used by ancient humans

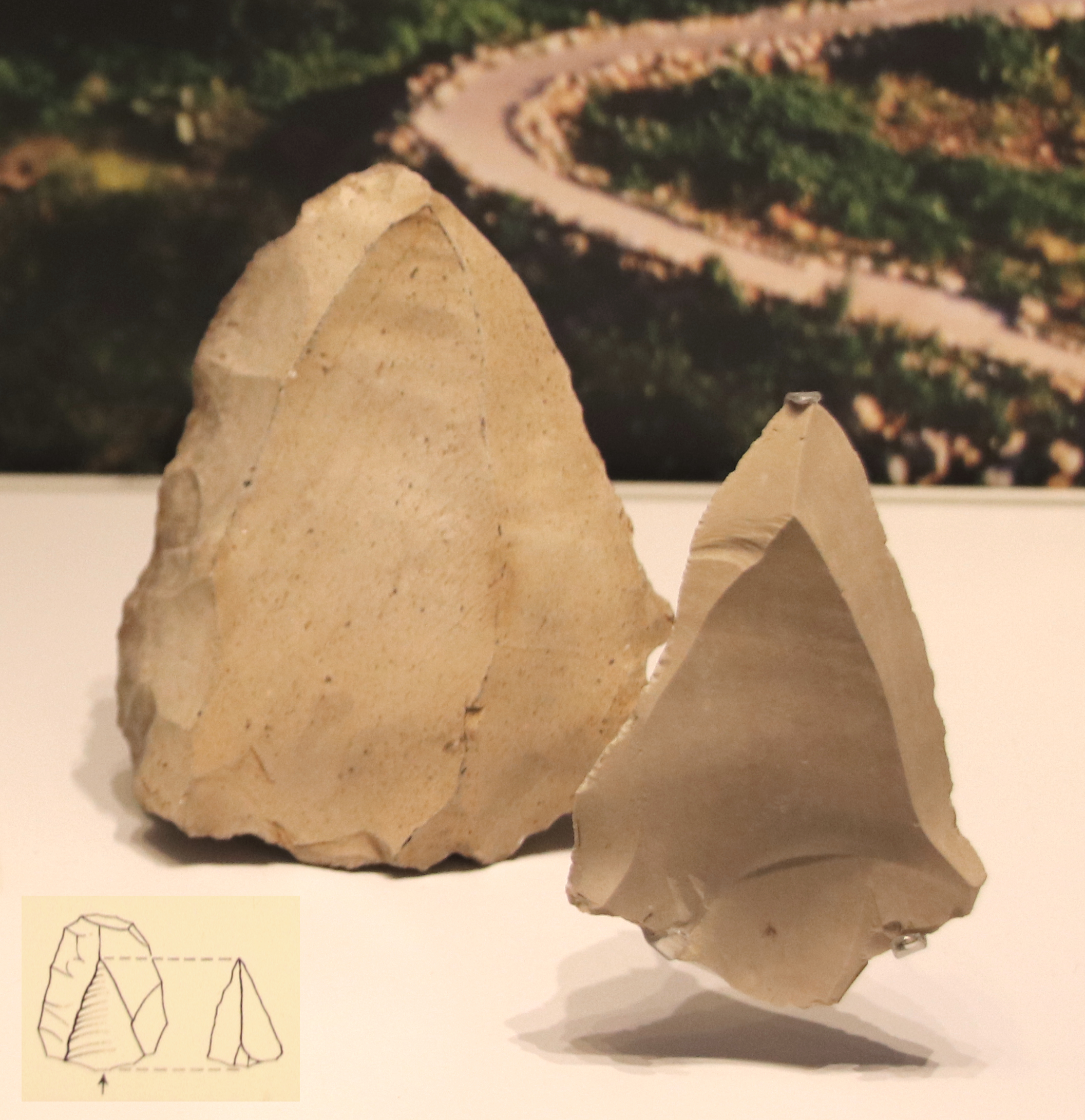
Production of points & spearheads from a flint stone core, Levallois technique, Mousterian culture, Tabun Cave, Israel, 250,000–50,000 BP. Israel Museum

The Levallois technique of flint-knapping

The Levallois technique (IPA: [lə.va.lwa]) is a name given by archaeologists to a distinctive type of stone knapping developed around 250,000 to 400,000 years ago during the Middle Palaeolithic period. It is part of the Mousterian stone tool industry, and was used by the Neanderthals in Europe and by modern humans in other regions such as the Levant.

It is named after 19th-century finds of flint tools in the Levallois-Perret suburb of Paris, France. The technique was more sophisticated than earlier methods of lithic reduction, involving the striking of lithic flakes from a prepared lithic core. A striking platform is formed at one end and then the core's edges are trimmed by flaking off pieces around the outline of the intended lithic flake. This creates a domed shape on the side of the core, known as a tortoise core, as the various scars and rounded form are reminiscent of a tortoise's shell. When the striking platform is finally hit, a lithic flake separates from the lithic core with a distinctive plano-convex profile and with all of its edges sharpened by the earlier trimming work.

This method provides much greater control over the size and shape of the final flake which would then be employed as a scraper or knife although the technique could also be adapted to produce projectile points known as Levallois points. Scientists consider the Levallois complex to be a Mode 3 technology, as a result of its diachronic variability. This is one level superior to the Acheulean complex of the Lower Paleolithic.

== Origins ==
The technique is first found in the Lower Palaeolithic but is most commonly associated with the Neanderthal Mousterian industries of the Middle Palaeolithic. In the Levant, the Levallois technique was also used by anatomically modern humans during the Middle Stone Age. In North Africa, the Levallois technique was used in the Middle Stone Age, most notably in the Aterian industry to produce very small projectile points. While Levallois cores do display some variability in their platforms, their flake production surfaces show remarkable uniformity. As the Levallois technique is counterintuitive, teaching the process is necessary and thus language may be a prerequisite for such technology, although Ohnuma, Aoki and Akazawa (1997) found modern humans could be taught the Levallois technique non-verbally at a similar level of effectiveness to verbal teaching.

== Evolution ==
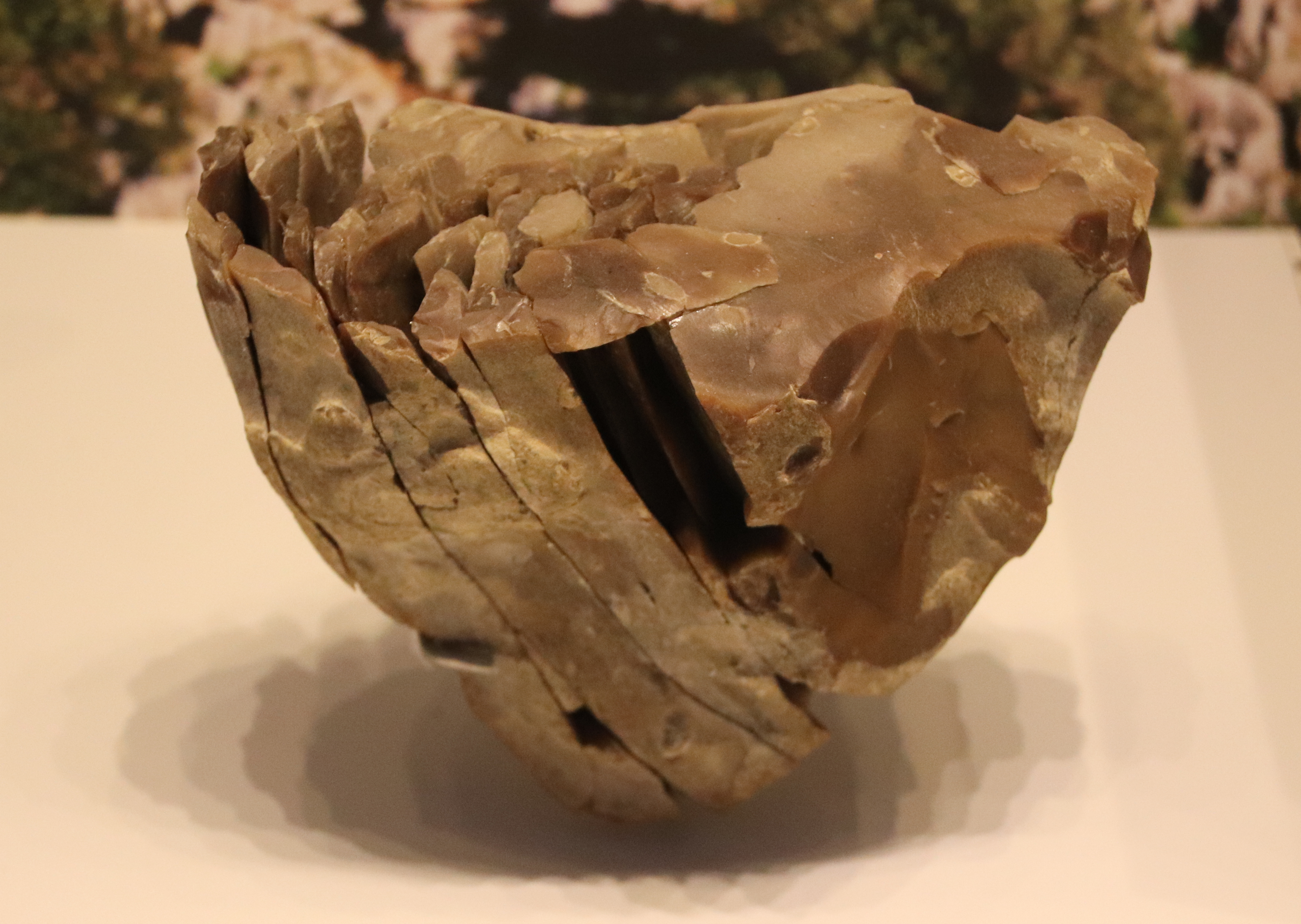
The Prepared-core technique starts by shaping a flint stone core for making blades (reassembled from blades for illustration purposes), Boqer Tachtit, Negev, Israel, circa 40000 BP.

The distinctive forms of the flakes were originally thought to indicate a wide-ranging Levallois culture resulting from the expansion of archaic Homo sapiens out of Africa. However, the wide geographical and temporal spread of the technique has rendered this interpretation obsolete.

Adler et al. further argue that Levallois technology evolved independently in different populations and thus cannot be used as a reliable indicator of Paleolithic human population change and expansion. Aside from technique, the overarching commonality in Levallois complexes is the attention given to maximizing core efficiency. Lycett and von Cramon-Taubedel (2013) measured variability in shape and geometrics relationships between cores over multiple regions, with an outcome that suggests a tendency for knappers to choose platforms with a specific surface morphology. In other words, they conclude that Levallois knappers cared less about the overall outline or shape of their core and more about the striking surface, evidence of complex pre-planning and recognition of an "ideal form" of Levallois core. A recent article by Lycett and Eren (2013) statistically shows the efficiency of the Levallois technique which at times has been called into question. Lycett and Eren created 75 Levallois flakes from 25 Texas Chert nodules. They counted the 3957 flakes and separated them into four stages in order to show efficiency, which grew subsequently in each stage. Based on the comparative study of 567 debitage flakes and 75 preferential Levallois flakes, Lycett and Eren found out the thickness is more evenly distributed and less variable across preferential Levallois flakes, which indicates the thickness is an important factor for efficiency and retouch potential. The experiment also shows that the Levallois core is an economic optimal strategy of raw material (lithic) usage, which means it can generate the longest cutting edge per weight unit of raw material. This result also implies that the mobility of prehistoric people was higher when applying Levallois technology; prehistoric people may explore more area with Levallois cores, which can make a longer cutting edge than the other flake-making technique under same amount of cores, and no need to worry about the lack of raw material to make tools.

=== Defining Levallois ===
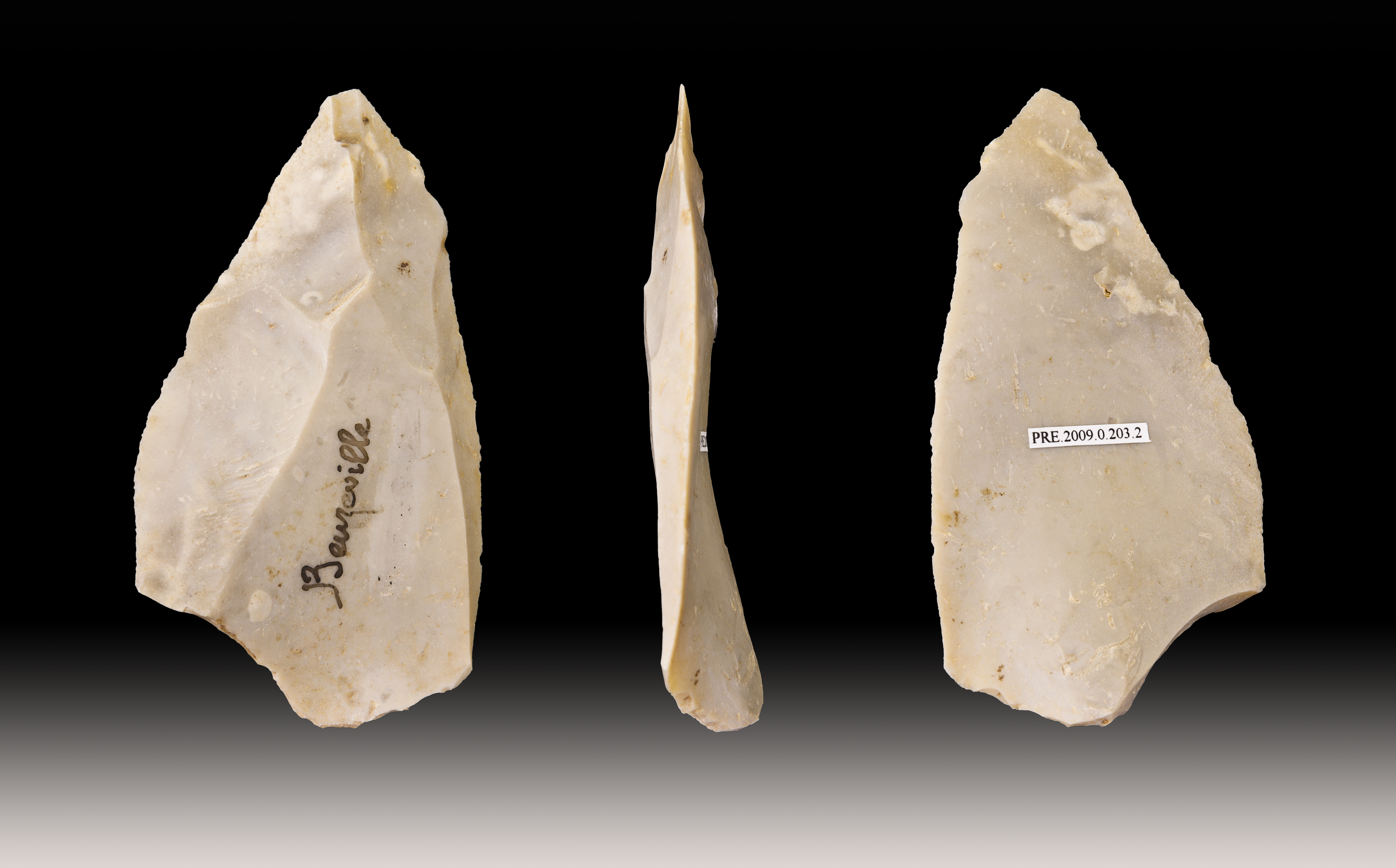
Levallois point – Beuzeville

There is disagreement when it comes to defining Levallois technology. Archeologists question which attributes and dimensions are specifically associated with Levallois, and argue that there are other techniques with similar cosmetic and functional aspects. Due to these disagreements, there is now a more precise set of criteria that outlines Levallois technology from a geometric standpoint. These criteria are:

1. Exploitation of the volume of raw material is organized in terms of two intersecting planes, or flaking surfaces;
2. The two surfaces are hierarchically related, one constituting the striking platform and the other the primary reduction surface;
3. The primary reduction surface is shaped such that the morphology of the product is pre-determined, which is fundamentally a function of the lateral and distal convexities of the surface;
4. The fracture plane for removing primary products is sub-parallel to the plane of intersection of the two surfaces; and
5. The striking platform size and shape is adjusted to allow removal of flakes parallel to this plane, usually through retouch or faceting.

== Locations ==
=== Africa ===
- Kenya: Large Levallois flakes struck from boulder cores have been found at the Kapthurin Formation site in western Kenya, near Lake Bogoria and Lake Baringo. The earliest examples come from the Leaky Handaxe Area and the Factory Site. Both examples feature large flakes, approximately 10–20 cm in diameter, and have been reliably dated to 400 thousand years ago.
- Morocco: At Jebel Irhoud, a former barite mine located 100 km west of Marrakesh, Levallois tools have been found. Dated as approximately 315,000 years old in 2017, the finds were highly significant to the understanding of both the development of this technique and early humans. John McNabb, archaeologist at the University of Southampton said of this: "The tools the people at Jebel Irhoud were making were based on a knapping technique called Levallois, a sophisticated way of shaping stone tools. The date of 315,000 years ago adds to a growing realisation that Levallois originates a lot earlier than we thought. Is Jebel Irhoud telling us that this new technology is linked to the emergence of the hominin line that will lead to modern humans? Does the new find imply there was more than one hominin lineage in Africa at this time? It really stirs the pot."
- Egypt: Within the banks of the Nile River, excavations have located Levalloisean implements within the 30-, 15-, and 10-foot terraces. Within the 30-foot terrace, the implements were originally thought to be early Mousterian, but were later reclassified. The 15- and 10-foot terraces again were classified first as Egyptian Mousterian, but later as developed Levalloisean.

=== Asia ===
- Syria/Israel: Excavated within a stratigraphic column containing tools from this culture.
- India: the open-air stratified prehistoric site of Attirampakkam, India, has shown that processes signifying the end of the Acheulian culture and the emergence of a Middle Palaeolithic culture occurred at 385 ± 64 thousand years ago. (ka)
- Iran: Levallois products have been discovered in Middle Paleolithic sites of the Zagros region including Bisitun cave, Warwasi, Darai, Kunji, Do-Ashkaft. There are a number of Middle Paleolithic sites in Central Iran that yielded Levallois flakes and blades including Mirak, Niasar, and Parvadeh.
- Afghanistan: Implements located in the Haibak valley.
- North-east Asia: Evidence dating from the Late Pleistocene at Shuidonggou, Northern China.
- Hong Kong: Wong Tei Tung in Sai Kung located in the east New Territories.
- Pakistan: The Soanian techno-complex from the Soan Valley located in northern Pakistan, has been identified as a Mode-3 Levallois complex.
- China: Evidence of Levallois technology from the lithic assemblage of the Guanyindong Cave site in southwest China, dated to approximately 170,000–80,000 years ago, is presented by Hu et al. (2018). The first discovered blade site in China was in Shuidonggou in 1923 by Vincent and Pierre Teilhard de Chardin. When they excavated the location, twelve localities were founded and had an age range of roughly 40,000–10,000 BP. Out of the twelve localities, SDG1 proved to be most important with the discovery of numerous unique, elongated blanks and Levallois-like cores found.

=== Southern Caucasus ===
- Armenia: Nor Geghi: one archaeological site. The artifacts, found preserved in soil under a later lava flow and dated at 325,000–335,000 years old, were a mix of two distinct stone tool technology traditions: bifacial tools and Levallois tools. Daniel Adler suggests that the coexistence of bifacial and Levallois tools at the site provides the first clear evidence that local populations developed Levallois technology out of existing bifacial technology, and that the artifacts found at Nor Geghi reflect the technological flexibility and variability of a single population. He further concludes that this challenges the view that technological change resulted from population change, and suggests instead that Levallois technology developed independently from existing technology within different human populations who shared a common technological ancestry.

== See also ==
- Yubetsu technique
