= South Island (disambiguation) =

The South Island is the southern island of mainland New Zealand.

South Island may also refer to:

- South Island (McDonald Islands)
- South Island (South Australia), in Pondalowie Bay
- South Island, County Down, a townland in County Down, Northern Ireland
- Yuzhny Island, the southern of the two large islands of Novaya Zemlya
- South Island, Cocos (Keeling) Islands
- Suðuroy (South Island in Faroese), the southernmost of the Faroe Islands
- South Island (Kenya), an island on Lake Turkana, Kenya

== See also ==
- Austronesia
- South Island line
  - South Island line (West)
- South Island School
- North Island (disambiguation)
