= Turkana =

Turkana may refer to:

- Turkana people of Kenya and Ethiopia
- Turkana language of Kenya and Ethiopia
- Lake Turkana in Kenya
- Lake Turkana National Parks
- Turkana County in Kenya
- Turkana IV, fictional planet in a Star Trek Next Generation episode
- The Turkana Basin geological feature.

== See also ==
- Turkana Boy
