= Ileret =

- Village
- Location in Kenya
- Coordinates: 4.31155°N 36.22710°E
- Country: Kenya
- County: Marsabit County
- Time zone: UTC+3 (EAT)

Ileret (also spelled Illeret) is a village in Marsabit County, Kenya. It is located in Northern Kenya, on the eastern shore of Lake Turkana, north of Sibiloi National Park and near the Ethiopian border.

Numerous hominin fossils have been found near Ileret, including Homo erectus footprints dating back to about 1.5 million years ago, making them the second oldest hominin footprints ever found after those at Laetoli, Tanzania.

== Hominin fossils found near Ileret ==
Besides the Homo erectus footprints, numerous other fossils have been found near the Ileret site.

In 2012–2013, a team of researchers from Stony Brook University found new hominin fossils near Ileret, in two sites within the Kolom Odiet area. The fossils were representative of three different individuals, composing of two partial skeletons – KNM-ER (Kenya National Museum – East Rudolf) 64061 and KNM-ER 64062 – and an almost entirely completed mandible, KNM-ER 64060.

KNM-ER 64060 and KNM-ER 64061 date back to 2.02 to 2.03 Ma, and KNM-ER 64062 goes back 1.82 to 1.86 million years ago.

The KNM-ER 64060 mandible is only missing the right central incisor.

The KNM-ER 64061 partial skeleton includes most of both humeral shafts, a partial right ulna and right clavicle, and a right shoulder blade. Its longer bones appeared to be slender, yet thick in its cross-sections.

The KNM-ER 64062 skeleton possesses parts of a distal right humerus and scaphoid, and parts of a right foot with both primitive and derived features.

These three individuals most likely represent members of early Homo, the mandible being from Homo habilis and the partial skeletons being from Homo erectus.

== Homo erectus footprints at Ileret ==
Fossilized footprints of Homo erectus were found in Ileret, Kenya. Science reported that there were multiple trails of footprints found at the Ileret site: “two trails of two prints each, one of seven prints and a number of isolated prints.” These footprints reveal that these early hominins most likely traveled in groups—evidence which researchers see as a sign of social behavior. Certain social behaviors distinguish humans from other primate species. Researchers attempt to find evidence of similar behaviors in the fossil or footprint records, however, it is difficult because this kind of fossil evidence is lacking.

Homo erectus fossils were discovered in 1.5 million-year-old layers of sediment. These fossils supplied information about soft-tissue and foot structure. Unlike the fossils, the footprints provide researchers with information about early foot anatomy.

Moreover, other Homo erectus fossils have been found in nearby areas and are the approximately the same age as the footprints found at Ileret.

== Homo erectus compared to other hominins ==
Differences have been found between these footprints and common apes. According to Rutgers University, “the big toe is parallel to the other toes, unlike that of apes where it is separated in a grasping configuration useful in the trees.” The arch of the footprint is also human-like and the toes are much shorter than those of an ape. Short toes are a sign of “upright bipedal stance.” Additionally, relevant observations point to similarities between H. erectus and modern humans. The footprints reveal comparable body weights, strides and gaits. These early hominins are the first to have such similar body proportions to modern humans (Homo sapiens).

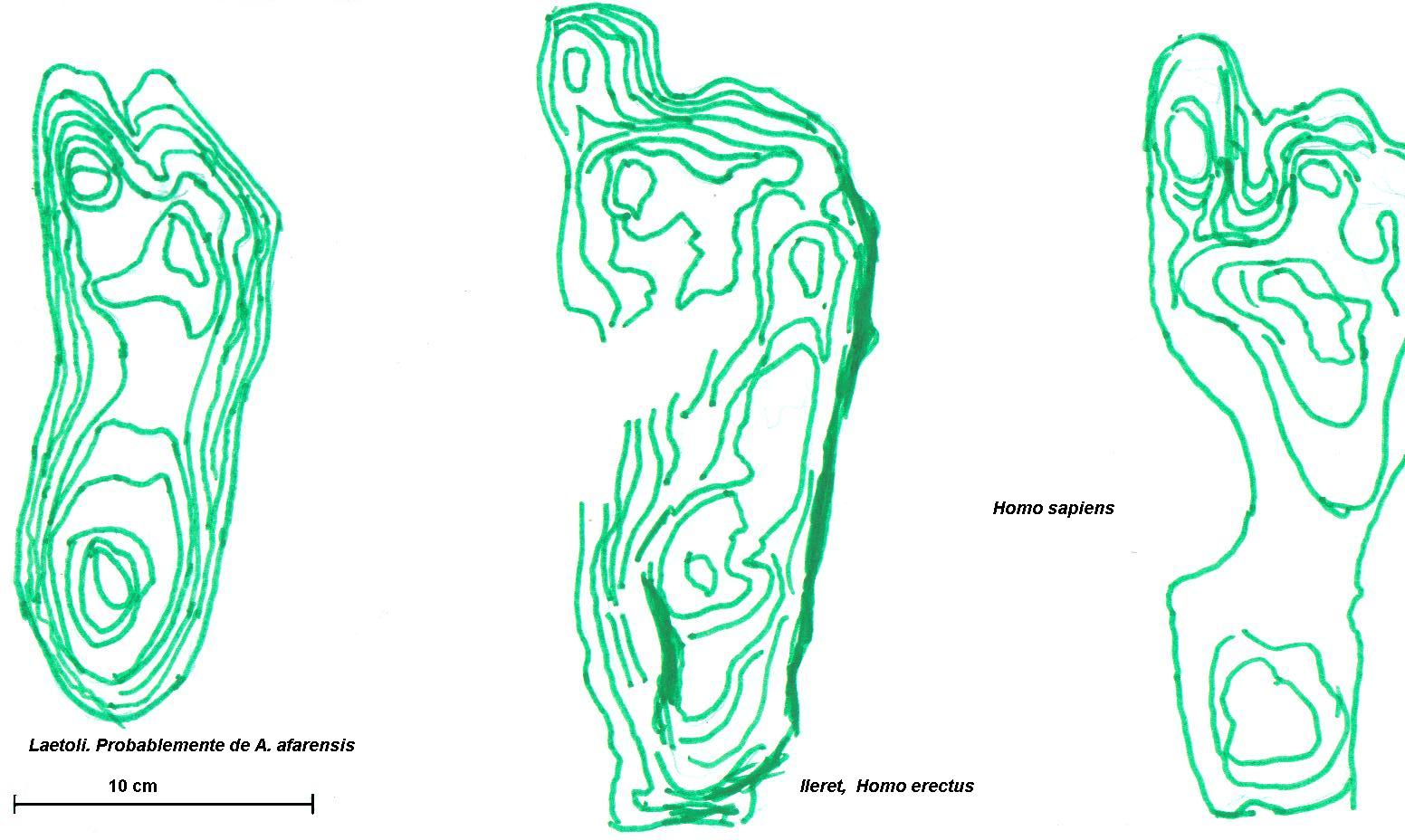
Interpretation of a diagramatics o Human footprint in Laetoli (3.7 My) thought to be from A. afarensis; Ileret (1.5 My), from H. erectus, and H. sapiens. The green lines represent the points under the same pressure/weight.

== Evidence of bipedalism ==
Bipedalism is a characteristic of modern humans. Fossil evidence reveals that hominins walked on two feet as early as 6 to 7 million years ago. It can be difficult to reconstruct gait evolution due to the inadequacy and scarcity of the fossil record. Often, fragments of bones are discovered and offer little information about hominins’ walking manners. Additionally, the hominin fossil record does not provide information concerning the social patterns of modern humans and other primates—patterns which drove evolution.

The Ileret footprints provide significant evidence that Homo erectus was a bipedal hominin. The footprints provide evidence for a “modern human-like weight transfer” and support earlier discussions of Homo erectus’ arched foot.

== Researchers ==
The footprints were discovered in 2007 by John W. Harris, BG Richmond, and David R. Braun.

== See also ==
- Koobi Fora, a fossil site and field research camp
- Laetoli Footprints
- Trachilos footprints Footprints in Greece
