= North Island (disambiguation) =

The North Island is the northern island of mainland New Zealand.

North Island may also refer to:

== Africa ==
- North Island, African Banks, an uninhabited island in the Seychelles
- North Island, Seychelles, a resort island in the Seychelles
- North Island, Kenya, an island on Lake Turkana, Kenya

== Asia ==
- Severny Island, the northern of the two large islands of Novaya Zemlya in the Russian Arctic
- Zhifu Island or North Island, an islet in Shandong, China

== Oceania ==
- North Island, Hawaii, an American island near Midway Atoll
- North Island (Houtman Abrolhos), an island off Western Australia
- North Island (rugby union), a New Zealand rugby football team
- North Island (Mangrove Islands), an island of Western Australia
- North Island (Titi/Muttonbird Islands), one of the Titi/Muttonbird Islands off New Zealand
- North Island (Torres Strait), one of the Australia's Torres Strait Islands
- North Island (islet), an islet in Palmerston Island in the Cook Islands

== North America ==
- North Island (Alaska), an island in Whitewater Bay
- "North Island" in British Columbia, Canada refers to the northern half of Vancouver Island
  - North Island (provincial electoral district), a provincial electoral district on Vancouver Island, British Columbia, Canada
  - North Island—Powell River, a defunct federal electoral district on Vancouver Island, British Columbia, Canada
- Naval Air Station North Island, a United States Navy base in San Diego, California
- North Island, South Carolina, an island of the United States

== See also ==
- Ile du Nord, Tasmania
- South Island (disambiguation)
