= South Island (Kenya) =

Volcanic island in Lake Turkana, Kenya

South Island (Hohnel Island)
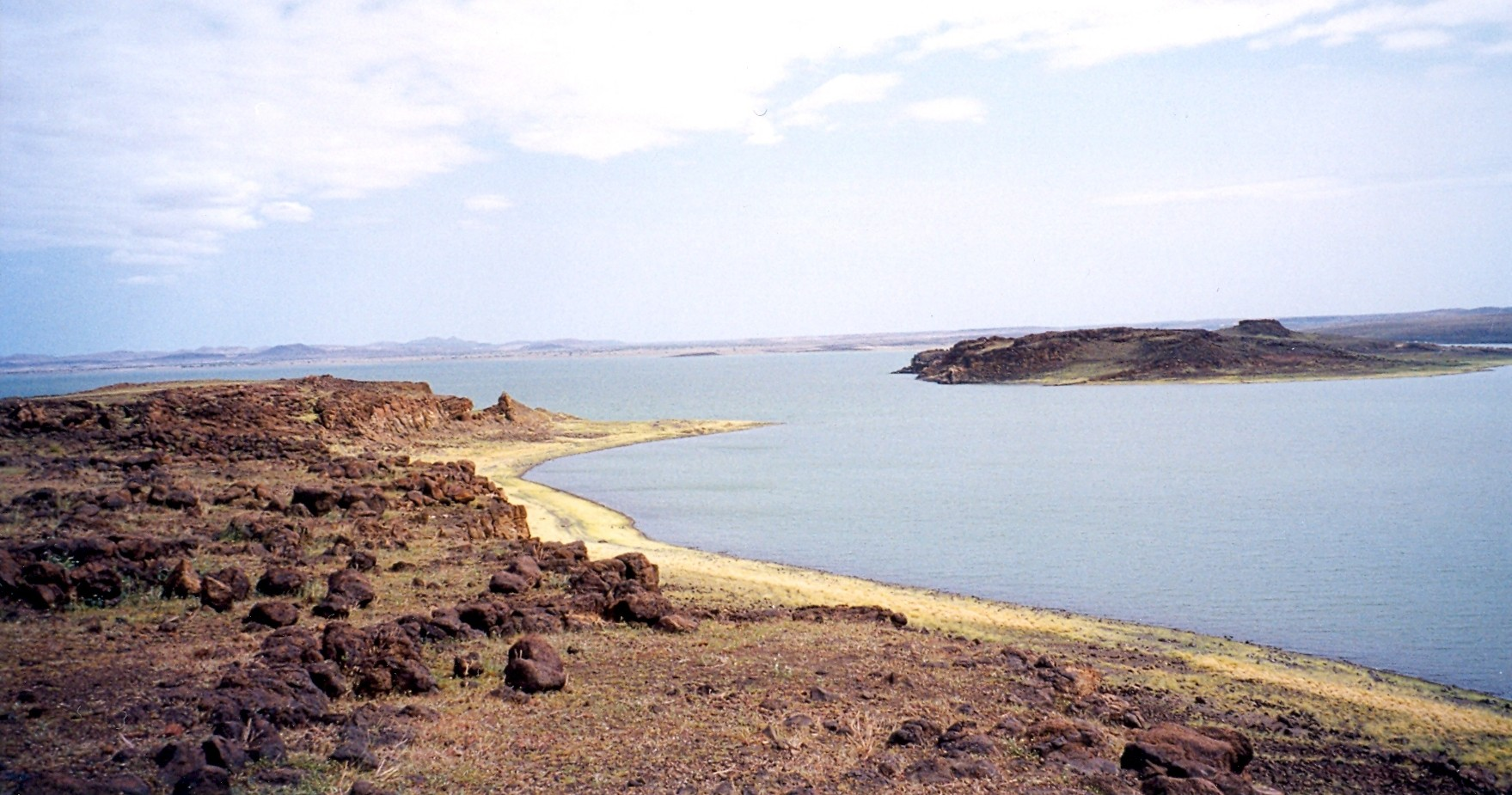

Highest point
- Elevation: 2,625 ft (800 m)
- Coordinates: 02°37′48″N 36°36′00″E

Geography
- Location within Kenya
- Location: Lake Turkana, Kenya

Geology
- Formed by: Volcanism along the Gregory Rift
- Rock age: Unknown
- Mountain type: Fissure vent
- Last eruption: 1888

South Island
UNESCO World Heritage Site
- Interactive map of South Island
- Location: Kenya
- Part of: Lake Turkana National Parks
- Criteria: Natural: (viii)(x)
- Reference: 801bis-002
- Inscription: 1997 (21st Session)
- Extensions: 2001
- Area: 500 ha (1,200 acres)
- IUCN category II (national park)

South Island, or Hohnel Island (named after Ludwig von Höhnel who helped with Teleki's expedition), is a fissure-formed volcanic island and the largest one out of 3 other major islands in Lake Turkana, Kenya. This volcano was discovered in 1888 while it was erupting by Count Teleki, a Hungarian explorer who led the first expedition into the region. It is a part of the Lake Turkana National Parks, which is a UNESCO World Heritage Site.

== Geography ==
The island is a 12 km by 5 km island, covered almost completely by recent lava flows erupted by the volcano. Around the island can be found some smaller islets.

== Climate ==
The island generally has a hot and arid climate which lasts from December to March. The coolest months on the island are June and July. Strong winds are a common occurrence from May to September. The annual rainfall at the island averages at 250mm.

== Discovery ==
Lake Turkana has been fished and traversed for thousands of years by local tribespeople. In 1888, Samuel Teleki, a Hungarian explorer, set off to a trip in Eastern Africa specifically in northern Kenya and southern Ethiopia with Ludwig von Höhnel, an Austrian naval officer and explorer. They were the first Europeans to see many places including Lake Turkana which was named Lake Rudolf (named after the Crown Prince Rudolf of Austria) when it was discovered, Lake Chew Bahir which was named Lake Stefanie (named after Princess Stephanie of Belgium). They also saw the Teleki's Volcano (named after Teleki) and South Island. Teleki and Höhnel made many observations and discoveries about the local geography, the community and others. All of their work was published in a book called The Discovery of Lakes Rudolf and Stefanie in 1892 by Höhnel himself.

== Humans and other species ==
Designated a World Heritage Site by UNESCO in 1997, the 39-sq-km volcanic island is almost completely barren and uninhabited, with only a few shrubs and trees and almost no fresh water. It does have some rock art, suggesting previous human presence. The population of wildlife includes large crocodiles, many bird species including European migrant birds, venomous snakes and feral goats. There is a small dock and a designated park campsite on the western side.

== Geological setting ==
The island sits in the southern portion of Lake Turkana which was formed by the East African Rift System (EARS). Along the EARS sits many volcanoes, the closest ones to South Island including Central Island, North Island, The Barrier and more.

The EARS, a rift zone which extends all the way from Mozambique to Eritrea, is a divergent boundary that is separating the African Plate and the Somali Plate apart at a rate of a few millimeters per year. As a result, seismic activity is caused which can sometimes have larger earthquakes as well as a belt of volcanoes being fed by the rift since in this case the tectonics and the volcanism are closely related.

=== Magma processes ===
The volcano sits on a rift zone, which means that tectonic movement is one of the main factors which generates magma. In this case, tectonic movement is a factor as volcanic edifice or materials underground loads into the crust, which modifies the differential stress and affects the upper crust relative to the volcanic materials' radius. Meanwhile, the principal stress' trajectory focuses to the greatest load within the materials. This focusing action (mostly with an asymmetrical stress field) leads to the creation of a magma chamber.

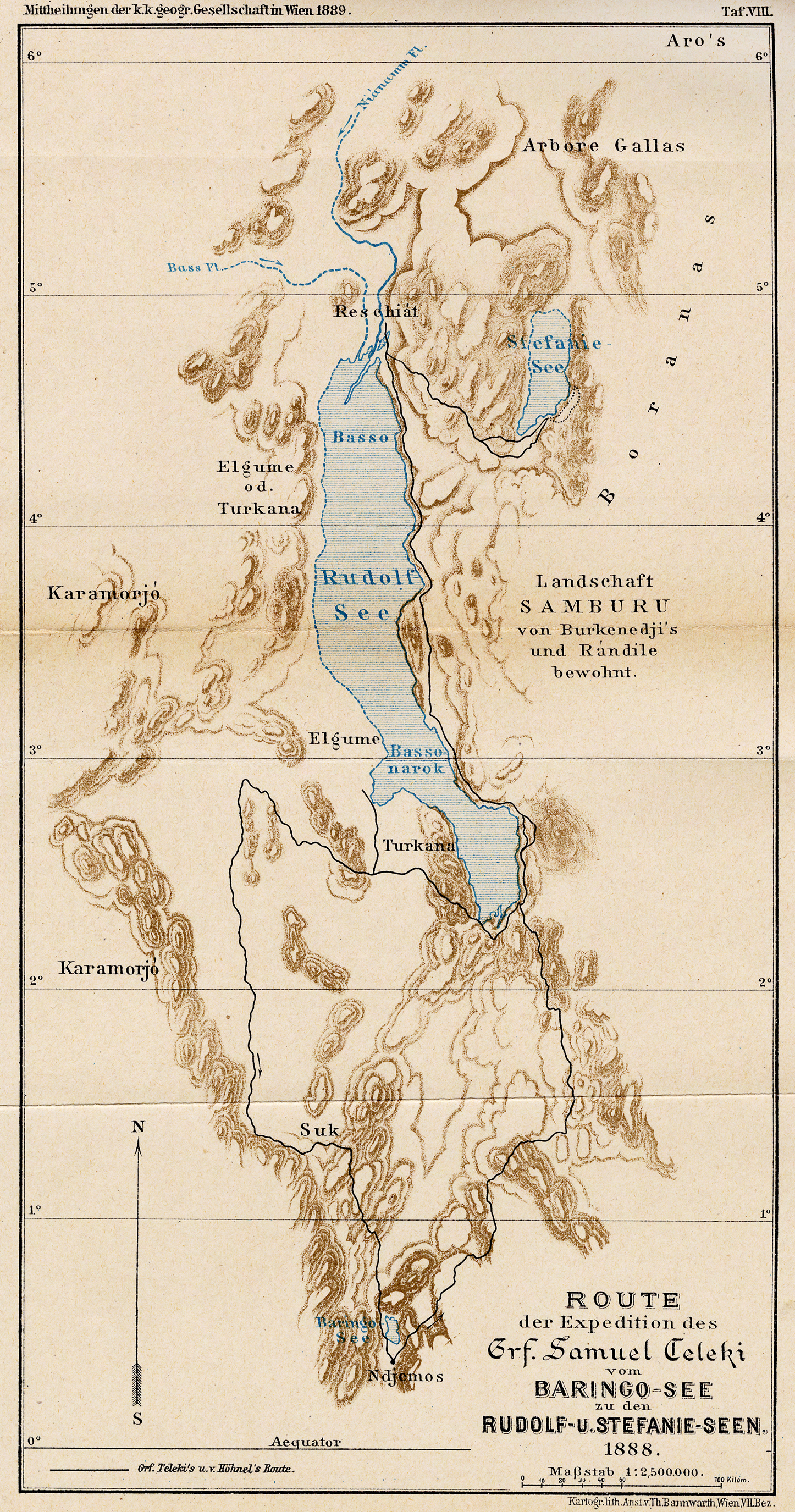
Count Teleki and Ludwig von Höhnel's journey in Kenya, mapped. The black line represents their route.

== Structure ==
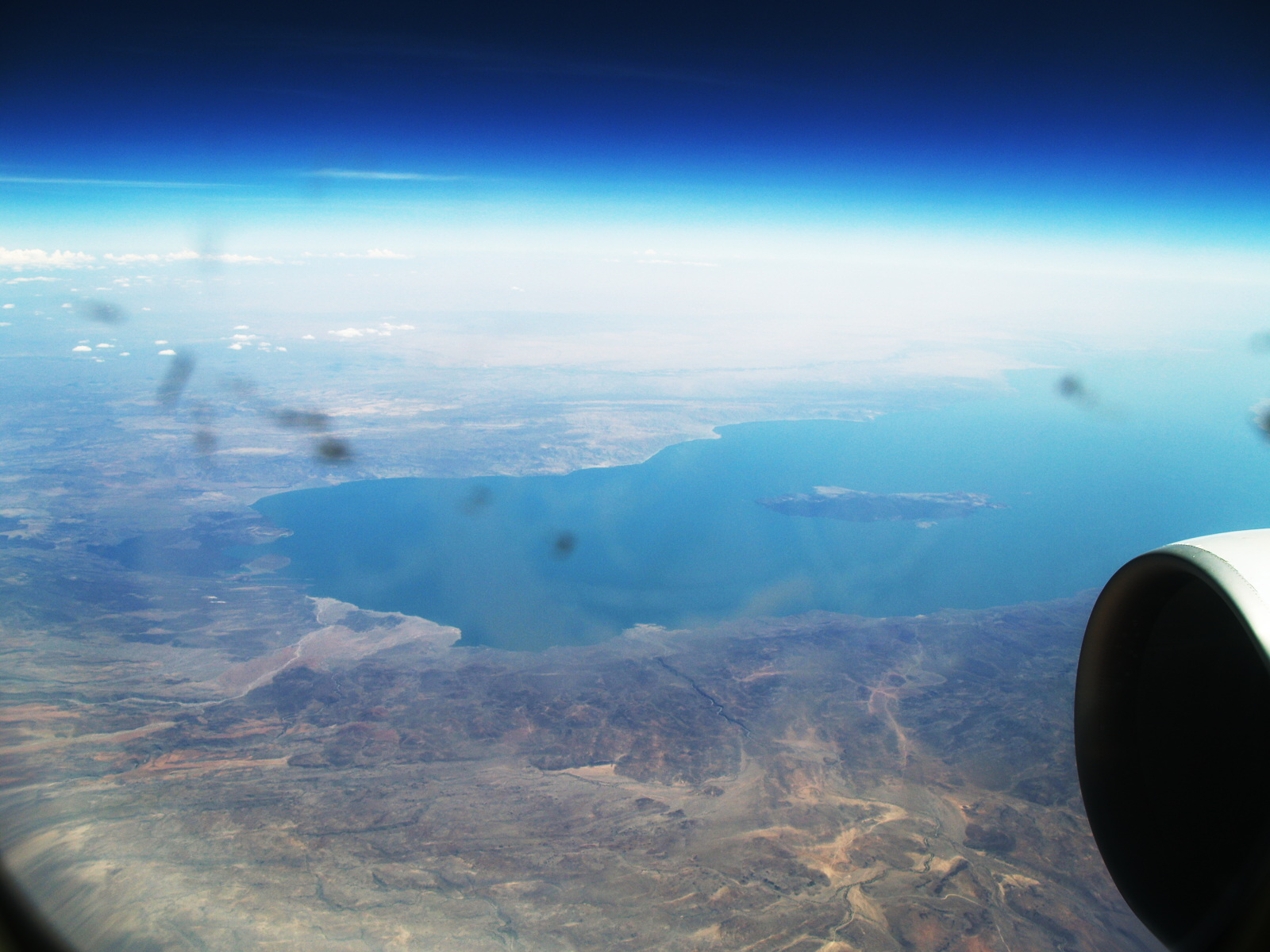
Lake Turkana and South Island viewed from the east from an airplane.

On South Island can be found a N-S (north to south) trending volcanic ridge which rises to about a height of 300 m. Along this ridge can be found several volcanic cones, which some rise to about a height of 800 m (above sea level, 320 m above the lake level). Several N-S trending faults can also be found on the east and west side of the main ridge, which proves that the island sits on a horst. Morphologically, the east and western side of the island differs from each other. To the east, basaltic lava flows originating near the ridge spill all the way down to the shore which completely covers the eastern portion. In comparison, the western portion is mostly covered in unconsolidated ash, likely from southwesterly winds. The lava flows and pyroclastic rocks are built upon older tuffs and smaller pillow lavas. Sandy beaches can be seen along the west side of the island. Elsewhere, small, isolated black sand beaches and rocky areas are located at small coves along the western and northern shores.

The oldest rocks and minerals on the island are sequences of basaltic lavas found on the terrace of the northeastern shore and the Enwoiti Islet (located 100m east of South Island). The sequence of rocks, from the base to top, includes hyaloclastites, pillow lavas, and massive lava flows. This sequence is estimated to be 30-40 meters thick. These units of older rocks are covered by an alluvium terrace which goes all the way to the western flank of the ridge.

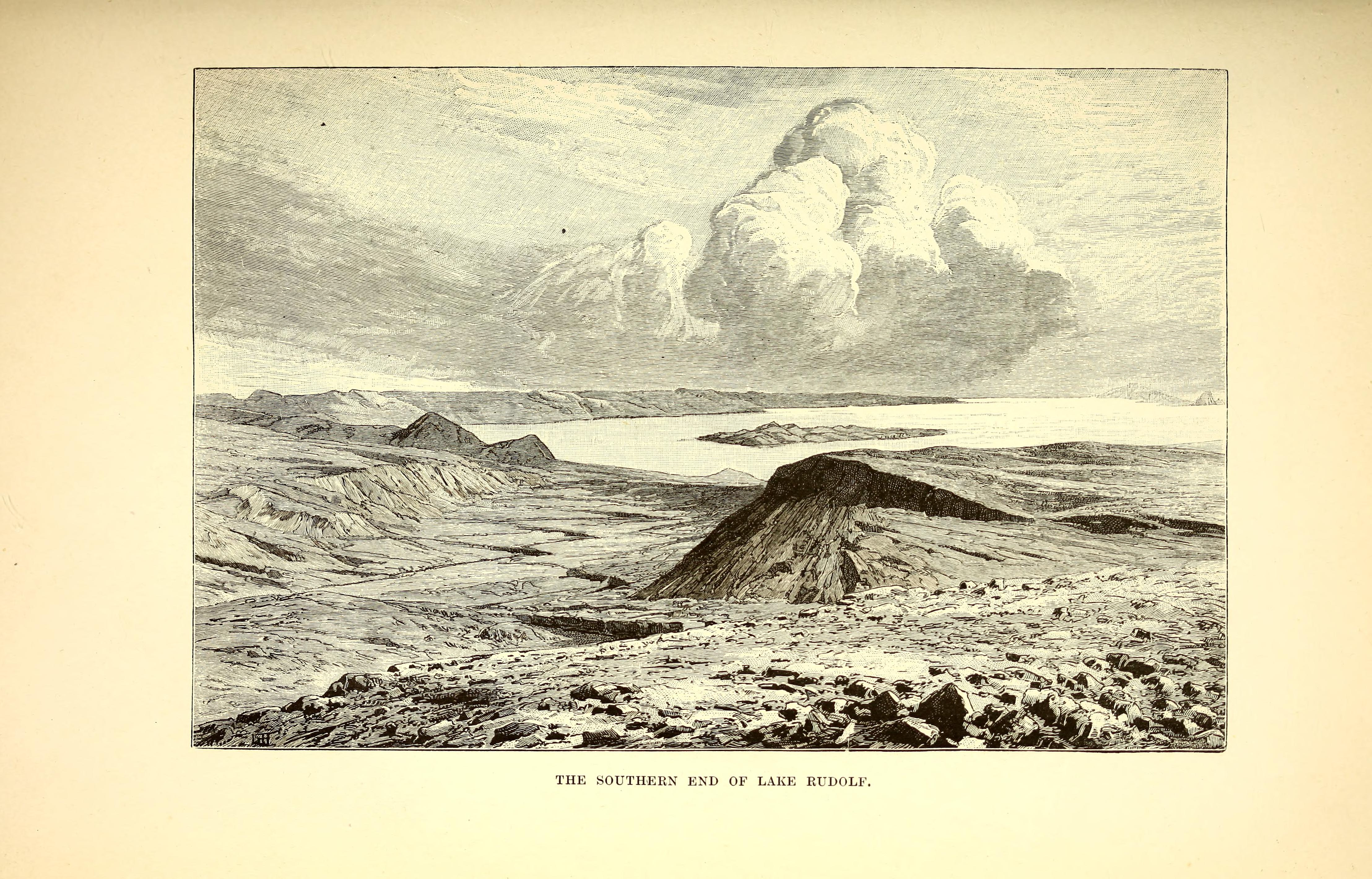
Lake Rudolf (Turkana) viewed from the south with South Island in the middle, 1894

== Geologic history ==
Much isn't known about the geological and eruptive history of South Island, however 1 eruption was witnessed in the 19th century.

=== 1888 eruption ===
When Count Teleki was in an expedition in Kenya, an explosive eruption of the Teleki's Volcano (The Barrier) was observed, which reportedly triggered lava flows and pyroclastic flows. Reportedly, meanwhile this eruption was ongoing, Count Teleki witnessed another but smaller eruption from a scoria cone in South Island from a volcano which prompted a lava flow, perhaps in relation to the eruption at The Barrier volcano.

== See also ==
- Lake Turkana
- List of volcanoes in Kenya
