= Kalokol =

Town in Kenya

Coordinates: 3°32′N 35°52′E

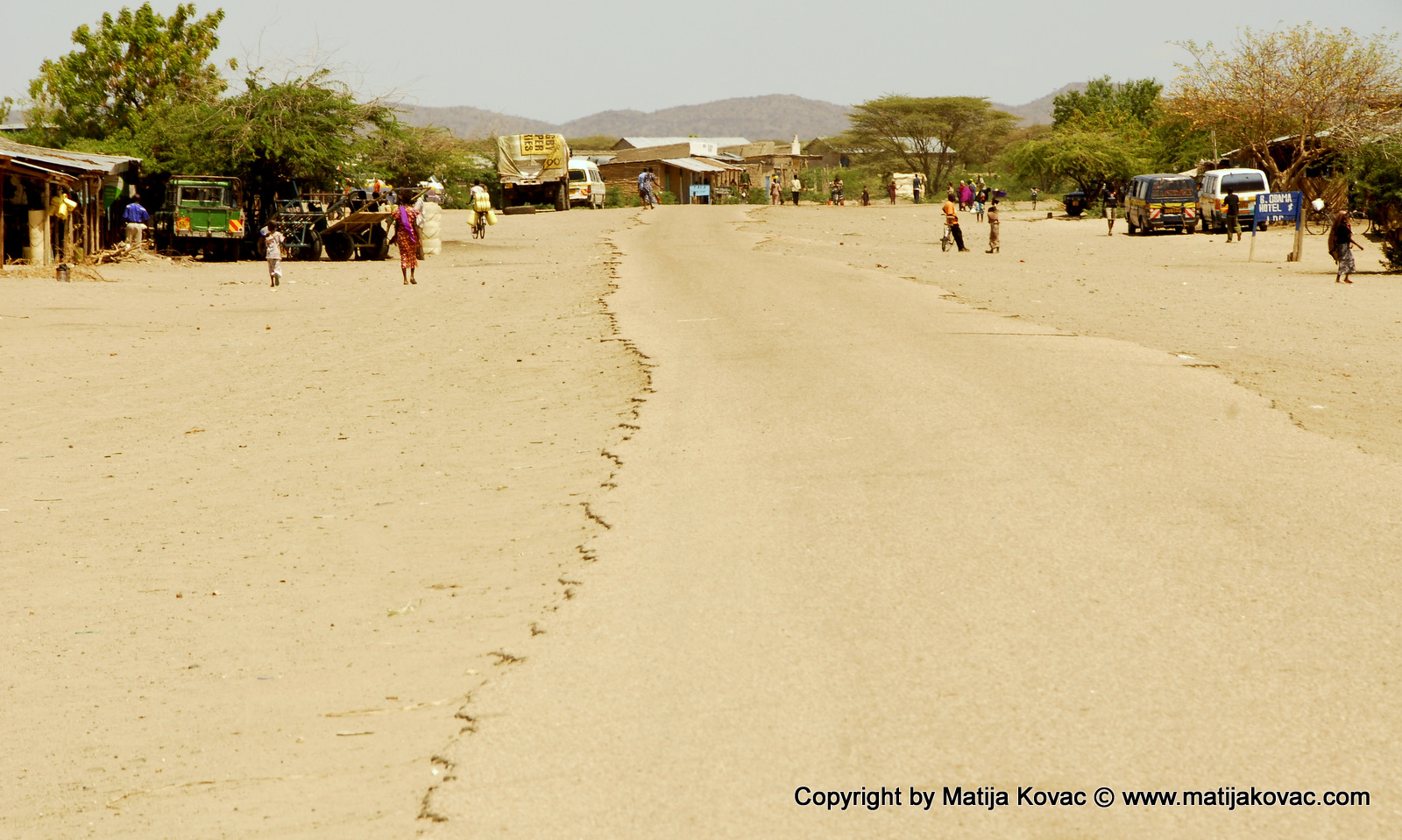
Main street in Kalokol

Kalokol is a town in Turkana County, on the western shore of Lake Turkana in Kenya. The town is the administrative headquarters of Kalokol Division of Turkana County. Due to the proximity of Lake Turkana, fishing is the main economic activity in Kalokol, which even has a fish-processing facility.

The area is windy, dusty, hot and dry—harsh even for local livestock such as goats and camels, allowing only limited pastoral activities and business development. The landscape is characterized by lowlands that stretch along the lake’s western shores.

== See also ==
- Kalokol Pillar Site
