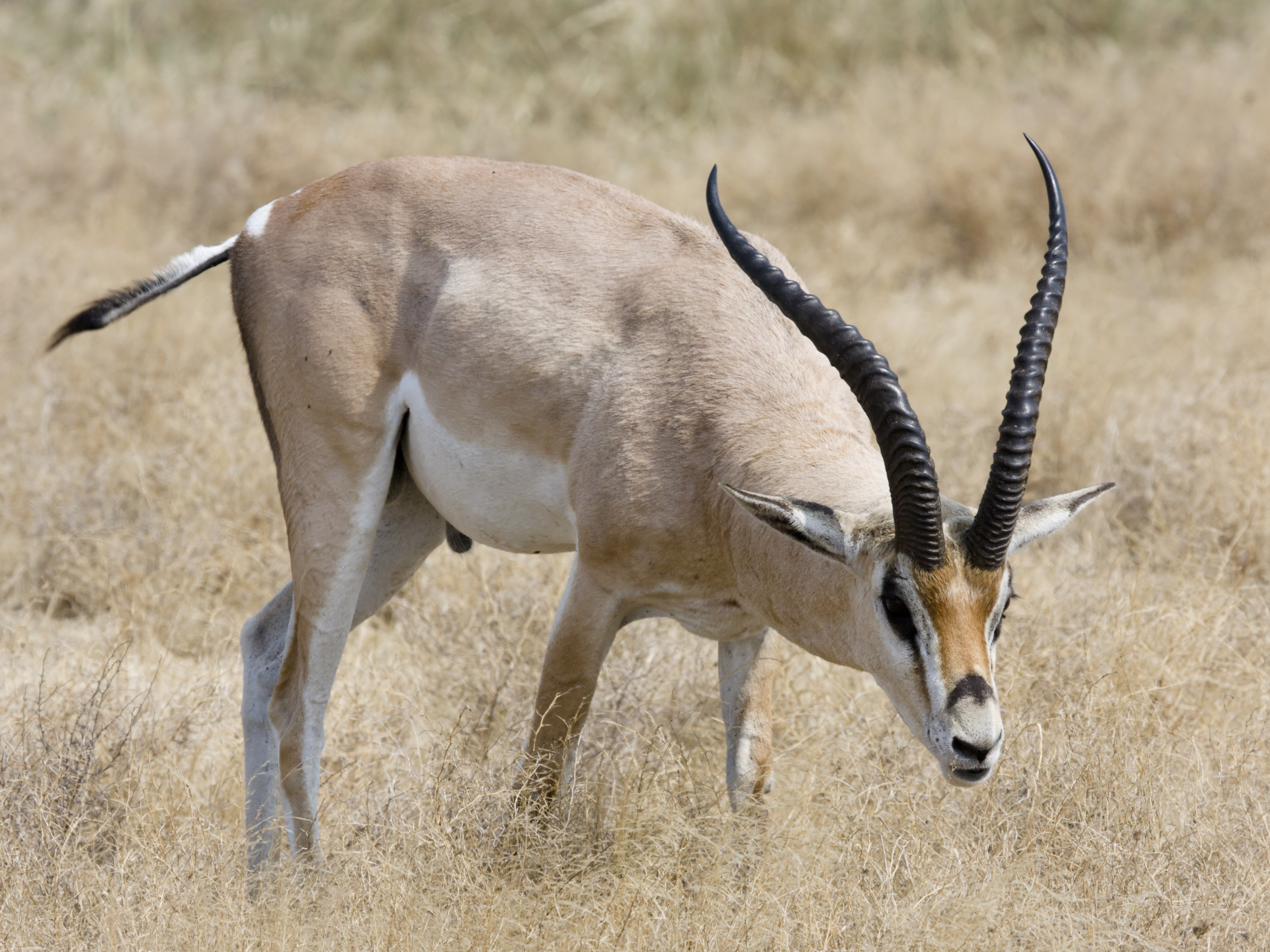
- A male at the Ngorongoro Crater, Tanzania

Conservation status
- Least Concern (IUCN 3.1)

Scientific classification
- Kingdom: Animalia
- Phylum: Chordata
- Class: Mammalia
- Order: Artiodactyla
- Family: Bovidae
- Subfamily: Antilopinae
- Genus: Nanger
- Species: N. granti

Binomial name
- Nanger granti (Brooke, 1872)
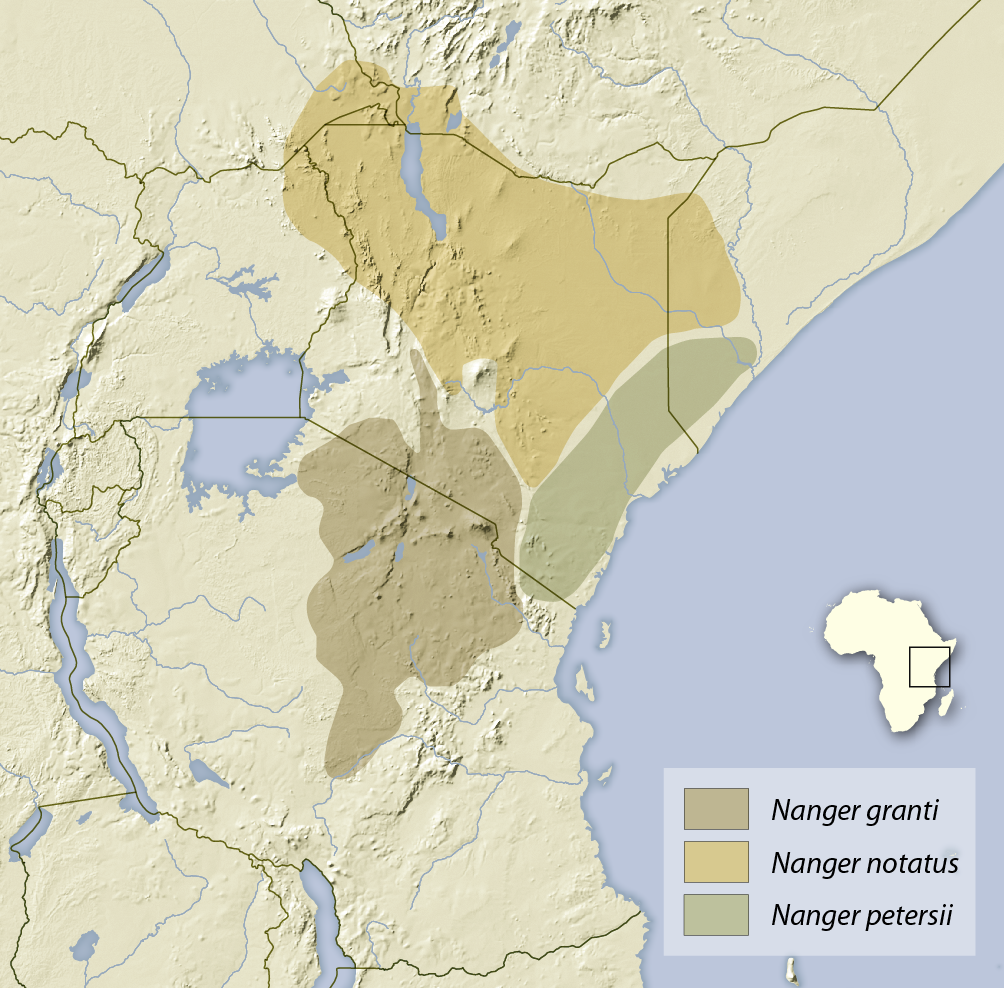
- The distribution of Grant's gazelles

Synonyms
- Gazella granti

= Grant's gazelle =

Species of mammal

Grant's gazelle (Nanger granti) is a relatively large species of gazelle antelope, distributed from northern Tanzania to South Sudan and Ethiopia, and from the Kenyan coast to Lake Victoria. Its Swahili name is swala granti. It was named for a 19th-century explorer, James Grant.

== Taxonomy and genetics ==
Grant's gazelle is genetically related to Soemmerring's gazelle (N. soemmerringii) and Thomson's gazelle (Eudorcas thomsonii) with Soemmering's gazelle being the closer relative. Grant's gazelle shows high genetic variation among its populations, although there is no geographic isolation. The differentiation of the species might have evolved during repeated expansion and contraction of arid habitats during the late Pleistocene era in which populations were possibly isolated. Grant's gazelle was formerly considered a member of the genus Gazella within the subgenus Nanger before Nanger was elevated to genus status. In 2021, the American Society of Mammalogists granted full species status to Bright's gazelle (Nanger notatus) and the Peters's gazelle (Nanger petersii),

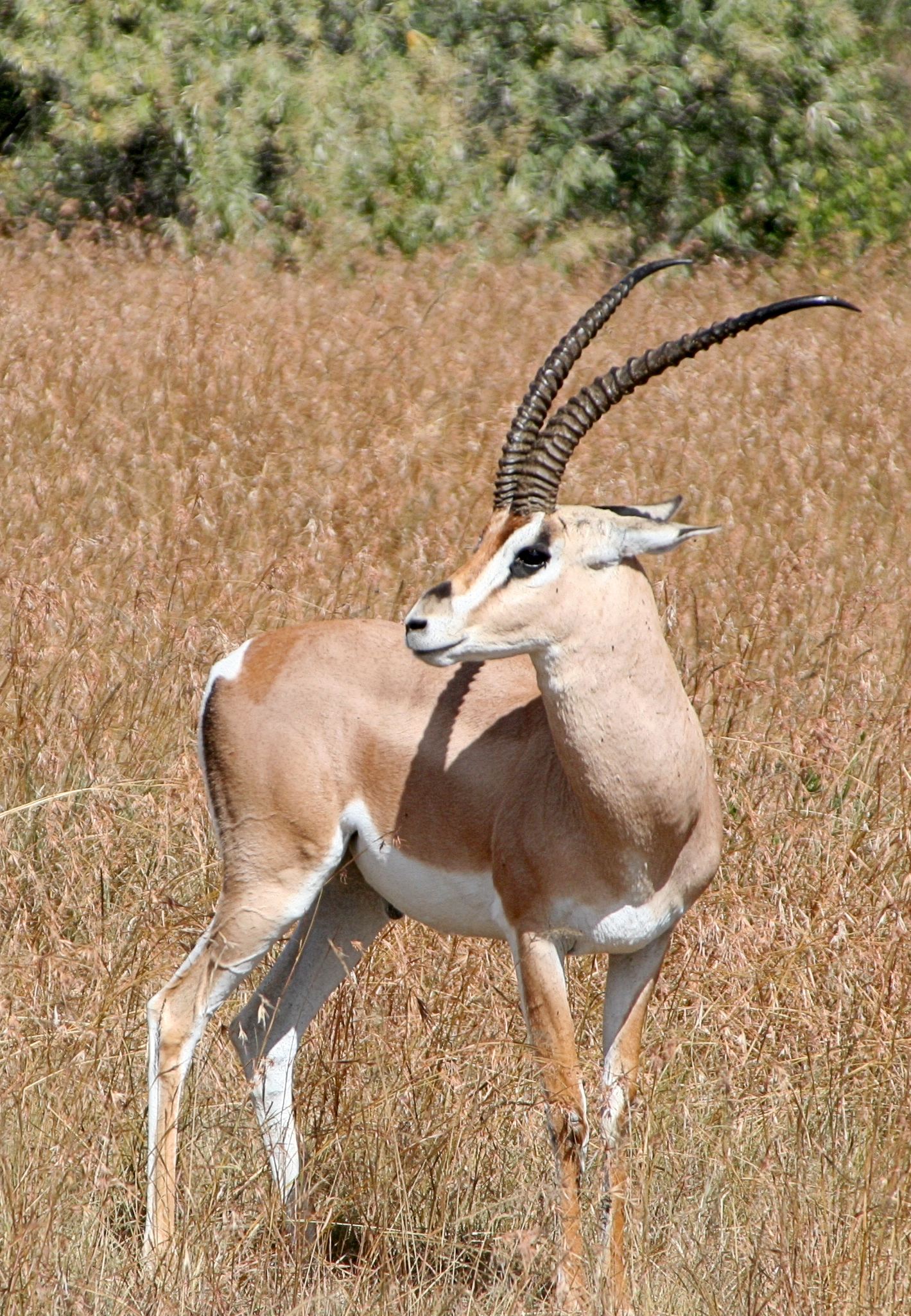
Grant's gazelle

based (mainly) on recent genetic analysis. This article currently treats all three as a single species.

=== Subspecies ===
Listed alphabetically.

- N. g. granti (Brooke, 1872) – southern Grant's gazelle
- N. g. lacuum (Neumann, 1906) – northern Grant's gazelle
- N. g. robertsi (Thomas, 1903) – Roberts' gazelle

== Description ==
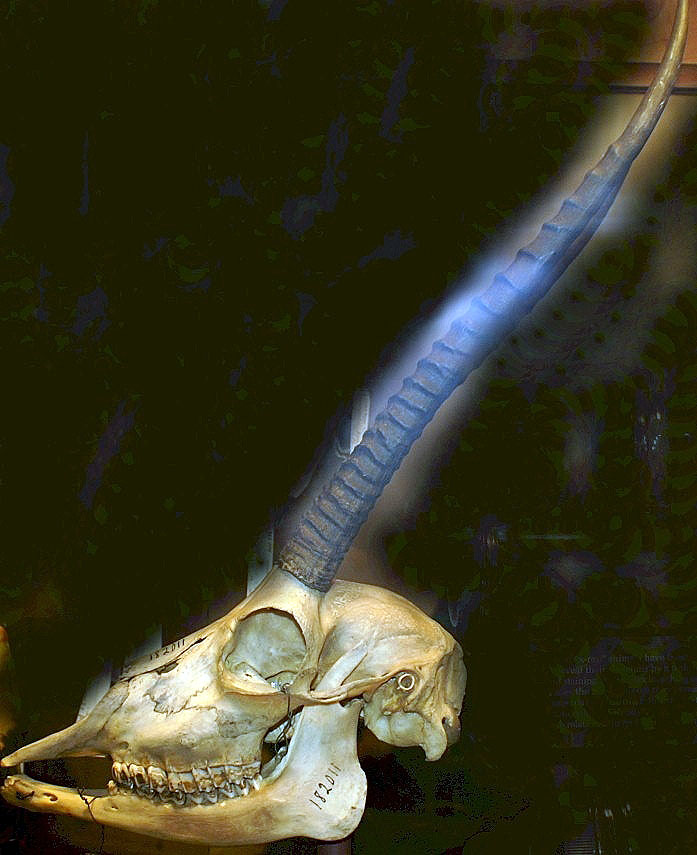
A skull of male exhibited at the Smithsonian National Museum of Natural History, Washington D.C.

Grant's gazelle stands 75–95 cm (30–37 in; 2.46–3.12 ft) at the shoulder. The females weigh from 35 to 50 kg (77 to 110 lb) and males from 50 to 80 kg (110 to 180 lb). Its coat is a beige orange on the back with a white belly. Grant's gazelle looks similar to Thomson's gazelle, except it is much larger and has lyre-shaped horns which are stout at the base, clearly ringed, and measuring 45–81 cm (18–32 in; 1.48–2.66 ft) long. A useful field mark is the white on the rump that extends over the top of the tail in Grant's but not Thomson's gazelles. The subspecies are segregated by different morphological characters, such as horn shape and slight differences in coat colour. These differences are not indicative of ecological separation as with some species.

== Ecology, distribution and behaviour ==
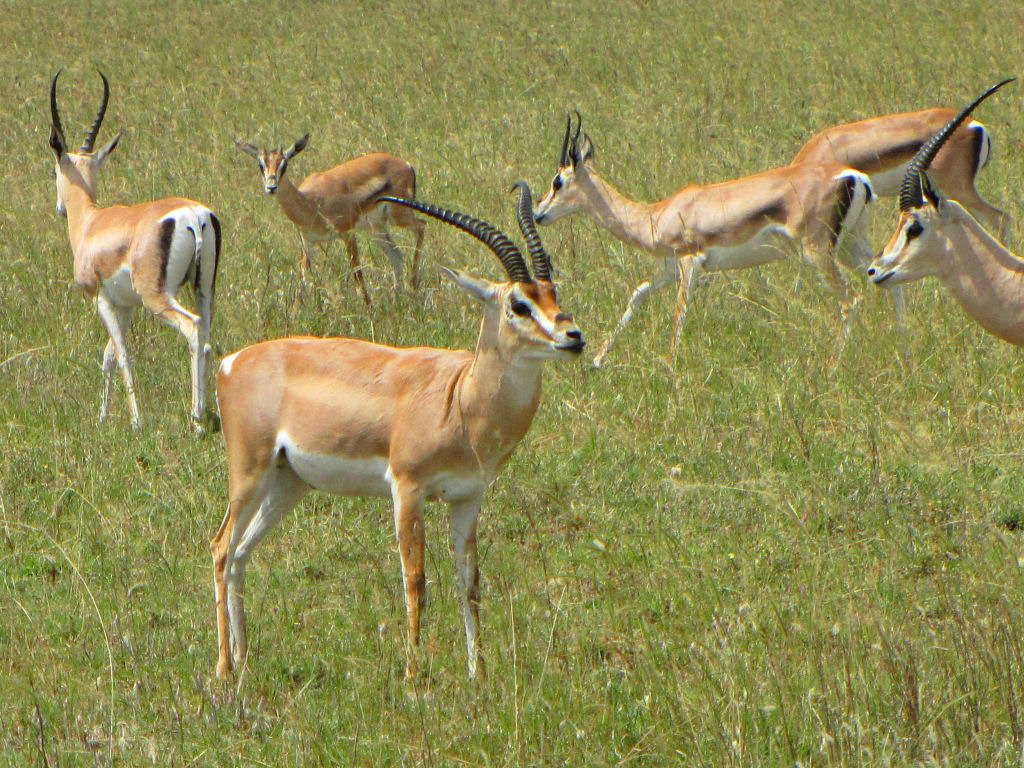
Grant's gazelles in green grassland

Grant's gazelle are found in several countries in East Africa, including Ethiopia, Kenya, South Sudan and Tanzania, where they live in small to mid-sized herds, separated into females with juveniles and bachelor groups; during the mating season, when males become territorial and protective over a harem of females to breed with, bachelor herds briefly married disperse before tensions die-down again. Confrontations between hormonal males rarely end in violence or death, with the 'loser' simply fleeing.

Grant's gazelle prefer living on short, grassy plains where they can graze, but can also be found browsing and foraging in more sparse, arid scrublands; they avoid areas with excessively high, untrimmed grass with compromised visibility of predators. They also occur in semiarid areas, being relatively well-adapted to drier areas, relying on more arboreal browse or shrubby, leafy material during the dry seasons to supplement their intake of water. They are sometimes seasonally migratory, but do not travel along the same routes as most of the other savanna ungulates, such as the Cape buffalo, plains zebra, Thomson's gazelle and the white-bearded gnu, which are all far more susceptible to dehydration. Grant's gazelle can subsist on vegetation in waterless, semiarid areas, where they face considerably less resource competition.

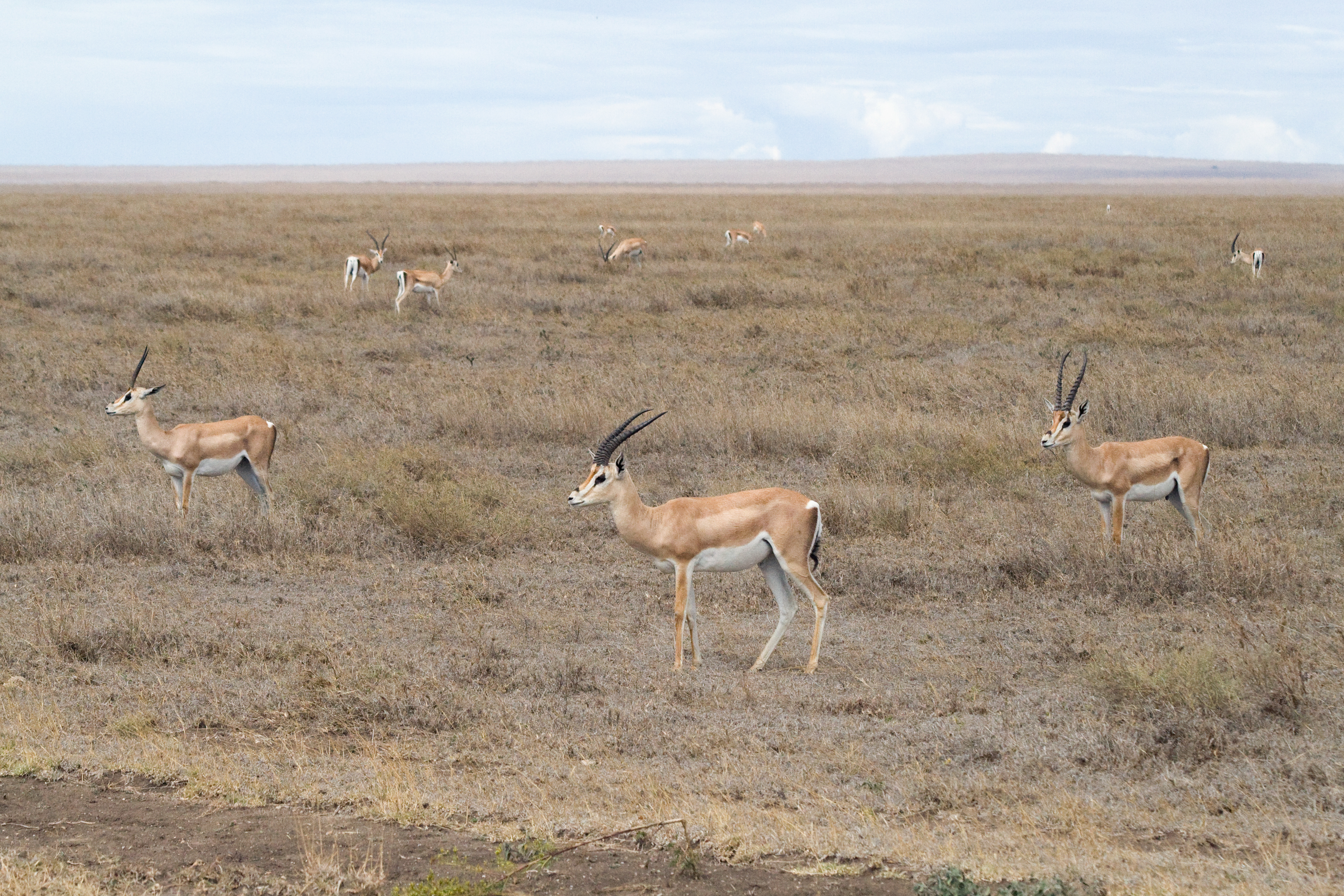
Grant's gazelles in dry grassland

The most common predators of the Grant's gazelle are the cheetah and African wild dog; the typical predatory threats of hyenas, leopards, and lions are also ever-present. African leopards may hunt Grant's gazelle, if given the opportunity, though they tend to prefer impala, an antelope which frequents the same open forest-grassland areas where leopards can sit in-wait in the trees. African lions could hunt Grant's gazelle, theoretically, though with their larger familial groups (prides), they generally pursue larger, more substantial ungulates such as buffalo, gnu, and zebra.

At rivers, streams and some lakes, Nile crocodiles are a threat to nearly any mammal (excluding rhinos, hippos or elephants) that is unaware and comes to drink or cross to the other side. Hippopotamus, while not carnivorous or outwardly predatory, are nonetheless extremely volatile beings with massive mouths and teeth, and are known to aggressively chase any other animal within their territory, including humans, at times resulting in the victim's death; a video was uploaded to YouTube of an apparently lost Grant's gazelle attempting to swim across a river filled with dozens of hippos, all of which responded with hostility. It is unclear if the gazelle made it across or not. Another video showed a Grant's gazelle attempting to flee a pursuing carnivore by retreating to the water, only to be attacked and killed by a hidden submerged hippopotamus.

Humans also hunt gazelle, the meat being fairly popular in some areas. In the Serengeti, Grant's gazelle is a potential prey item for the cheetah, but the smaller Thomson's gazelle is preferred; in Nairobi National Park, Grant's gazelle are seemingly preferred by cheetahs over Thomson's gazelle, making them an important resource for the cheetah. Black-backed jackals are major predators of fawns.

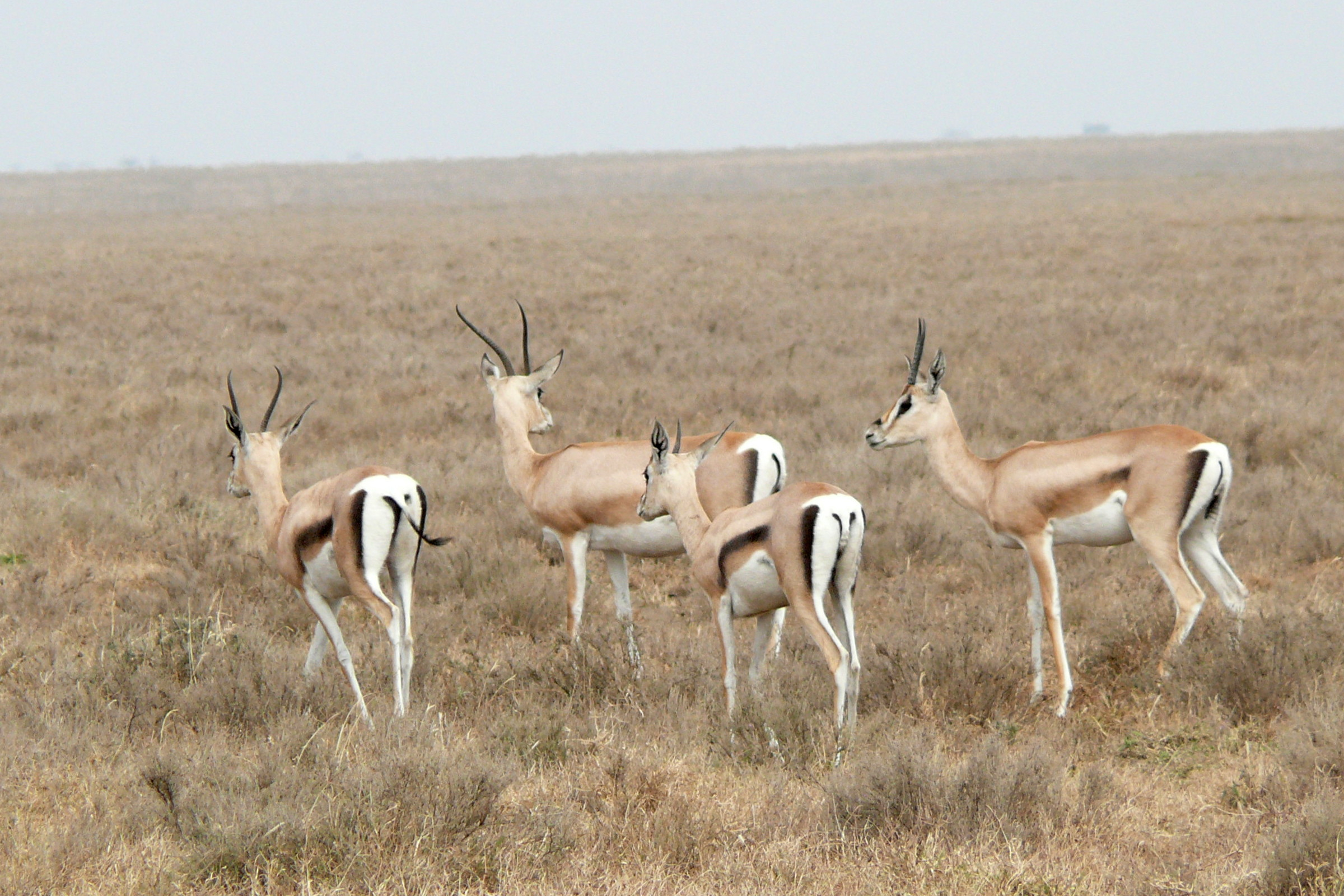
Grant's gazelles

The Grant's gazelle is a gregarious, territorial, and sometimes-migratory species. The home ranges of females overlap with those of the males. Only the male gazelles are territorial. Male gazelles will herd all females that cross their territories. When the females are in estrus, they are strongly guarded by the dominant male, who prevents other males from mating with them. Any female that tries to leave is aggressively herded back. Most of the time, the male's stance in relation to her is enough to keep the female from leaving.

The bachelor groups are composed of adolescent males and adult males not currently holding territory. Any potentially new members will perform mock-intimidation displays to enter the group. However, bachelor groups tend to be loose and members can come and go at-will. Grant's gazelle will sometimes join groups of Thomson's gazelle to protect themselves from predators. Predators are less likely to attack the Grant's gazelle when associated with these mixed groups, perhaps because the Thomson's gazelle provides an easier target. The larger, older males with thick horns have the best chance of establishing a territory. Conflicts between adult males are usually solved with intimidation displays. The bucks circle each other and swing their necks from side to side, displaying their neck power. Neck strength is important in an actual fight and the male that cannot keep up yields. Gazelles of nearly equal neck strength are more likely to engage in actual combat. Fighting occurs in young males more often than older ones. Dominant males can simply run off subordinates rather than having to display to them.

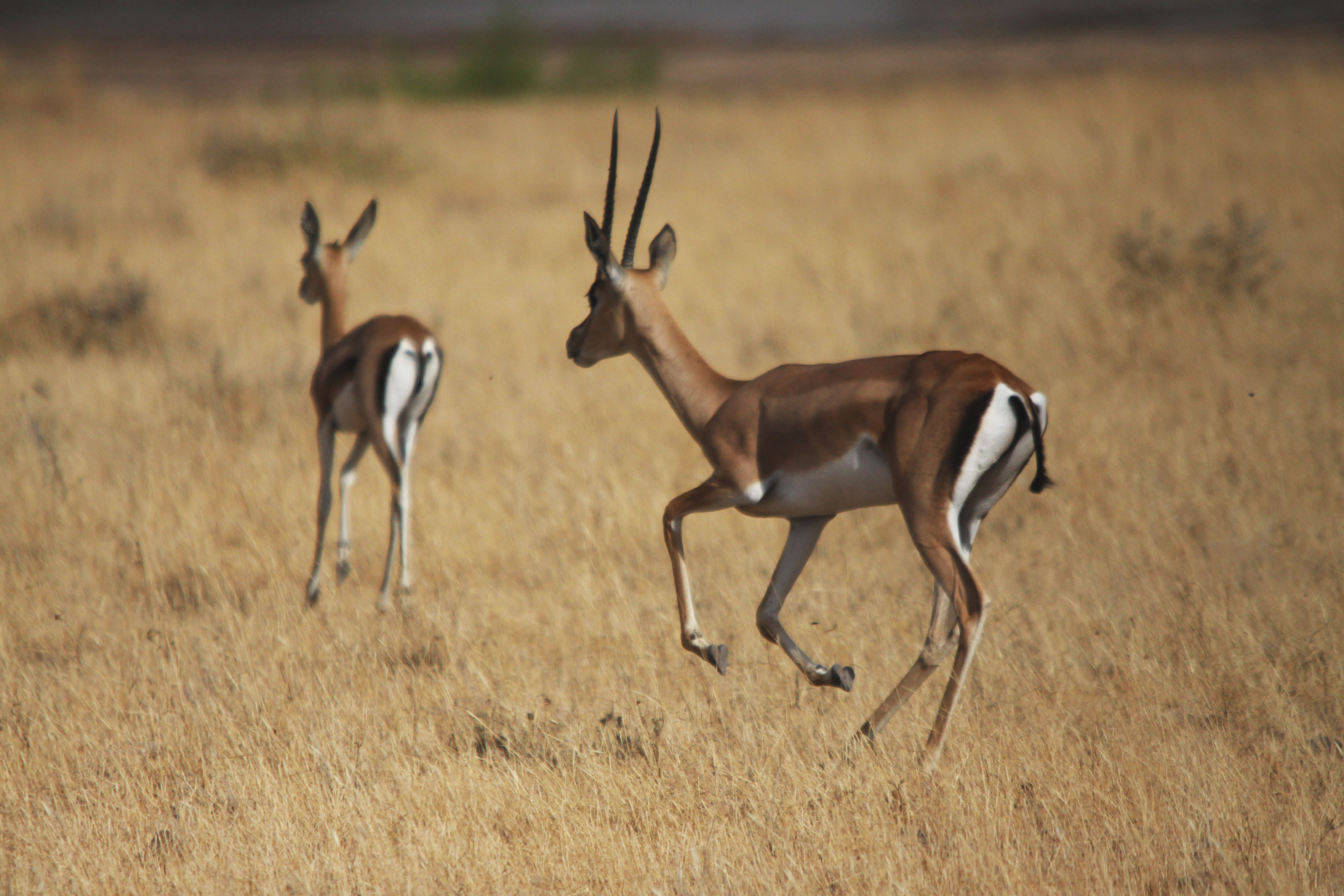
Female and young Grant's gazelles

=== Diet ===
Grant's gazelles are generally mixed feeders that both browse and graze. In one study, their diet consisted of 66% browse and 34% graze. Rainfall seems to be a determinant of their diets. One way the Grant's gazelle withstands dehydration and heat stress is by being very efficient in digesting dry matter. Grant's gazelles consume a smaller amount of food than domesticated animals, but they are better-suited for extreme environments because they derive protein from forage more quickly. The Grant's gazelle's diet may be responsible for the slow growth rates of browsed plants. They get most of their moisture from the plants they eat, so they do not often have to drink water. Thus they can stay on the plains long after the rains end. In dry seasons, gazelles move deep into dense brush and wait for the next rains. They will eat red oat grass and small, tough plants, which are avoided by the other ungulates. This allows the gazelles to survive in the brush during the dry season. Grant's gazelles eat mainly dicotyledons during the dry season and grass in the wet season.

=== Reproduction ===
Grant's gazelles sexually mature at 18 months. Territory-holding males mate more than those in bachelor groups. The courting ritual begins with a male following a female, waiting for her to urinate. When she does, the male does the Flehmen response to determine if she is in estrus. If she is, he will continue to follow her. The female will lift her tail, signaling she is ready to mate, and the male will mount her. The gestation period for the gazelle lasts for 198 days. Births in the Serengeti peak in January and February. A female will leave her herd and find a well-hidden place to give birth. Afterwards, the female eats the afterbirth and other fluids to keep the fawn clean and scentless. Females that have recently given birth will stay together for protection. The females nurse their fawns four times a day. Fawns are immobile for the first few days, and the mother stays close by. When the fawn can walk, it leaves with its mother to join a herd. Around this time, fawns will associate with one another in peer groups. A gazelle is weaned at six months, but will continue to associate with its mother until adolescence.

== Threats and conservation ==
The Grant's gazelle is still a common species, despite having been eradicated in certain areas. Major threats have been habitat destruction and poaching. The gazelle's status as an unthreatened species is dependent on protection of the national parks and reserves where it lives, including Serengeti National Park and Ngorongoro Conservation Area in Tanzania, and Lake Turkana National Parks in Kenya. Estimates of the population range from 140,000 to 350,000. While certain areas have stable populations, overall the population trend is going downward.
