= Central Island =

UNESCO World Heritage Site
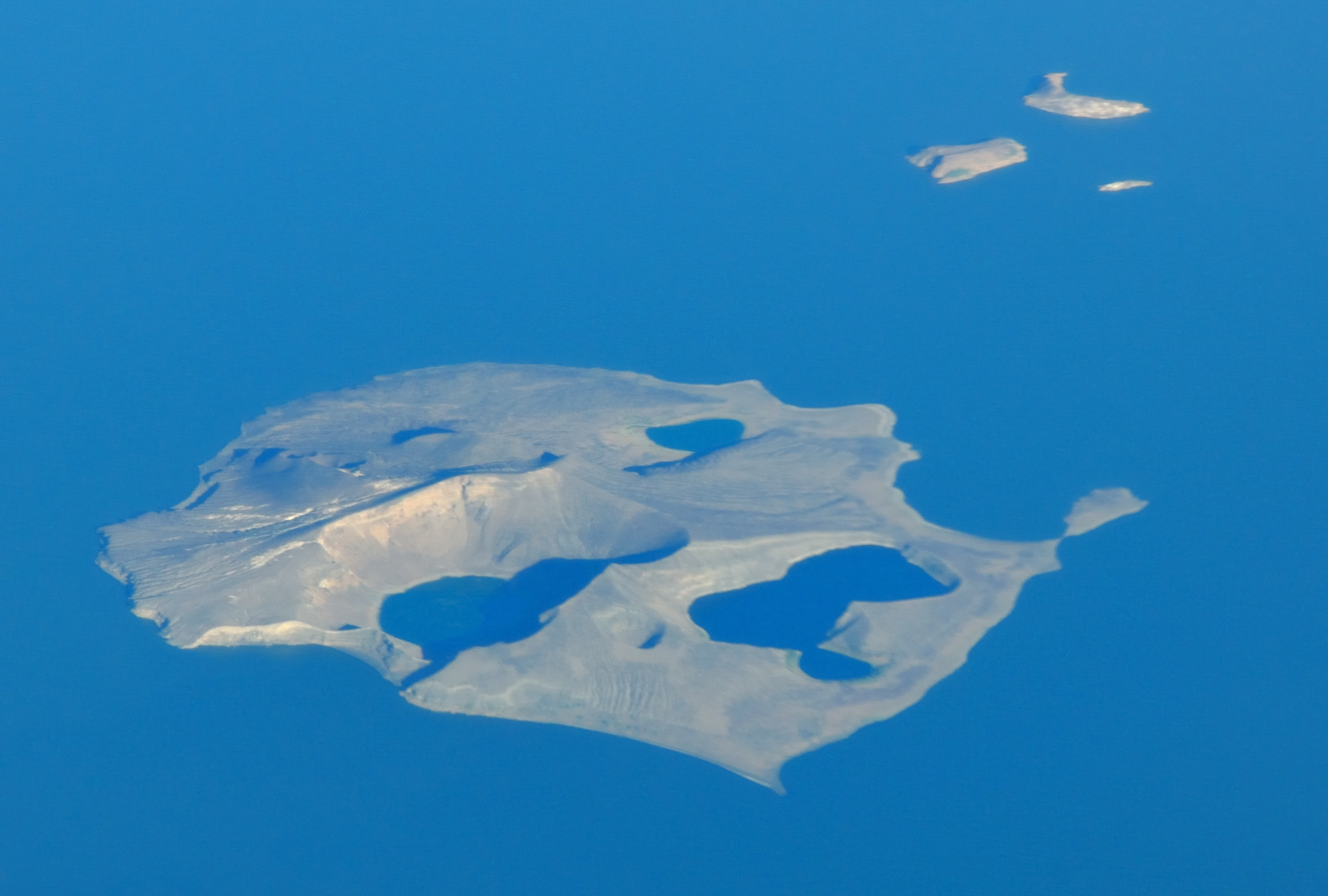

- Location within Kenya
- Location: Kenya
- Part of: Lake Turkana National Parks
- Criteria: Natural: (viii)(x)
- Reference: 801bis-002
- Inscription: 1997 (21st Session)
- Extensions: 2001
- Area: 500 ha (1,200 acres)
- Coordinates: 3°29′46″N 36°02′11″E
- IUCN category II (national park)

Central Island, also known as Crocodile Island, is a volcanic island located in the middle of Lake Turkana in Kenya. It is also the location of Central Island National Park, which is governed by the Kenya Wildlife Service.

== Overview ==
Central Island is composed of more than a dozen craters and cones, three of which are filled by small lakes. The two largest lakes partially fill craters up to a kilometre wide and about 80 m deep, the floors of which are near sea level. The highest point on the dominantly basaltic island reaches 550 m, about 190 m above the lake surface. An E-W-trending chain of small explosion craters cuts the eastern side of the 3-km-wide island. Several small islands to the SE represent partially submerged crater rims, and other cones and lava plugs lie beneath the lake surface near the island.

The youngest Central Islands tuffs and lavas may be as young as the Holocene (Karson and Curtis, 1992). Fumarolic activity is concentrated along the NE-to-SE rim of the central crater, and sprays of sulfur from the fumaroles were observed by visitors in the 1930s. In 1974 intense emission of molten sulfur and steam clouds were seen from the mainland.
