= South Island (McDonald Islands) =

Coordinates: 53°3′S 72°36′E

South Island is a rock lying 22 nautical miles (43 km) west of McDonald Island, marking the southernmost feature in the McDonald Islands. Surveyed and given this descriptive name by the ANARE (Australian National Antarctic Research Expeditions) in 1948.

== See also ==
- List of antarctic and sub-antarctic islands
