= Sibiloi National Park =

National Park in Kenya

- Hifadhi ya Taifa ya Sibiloi
- IUCN category II (national park)
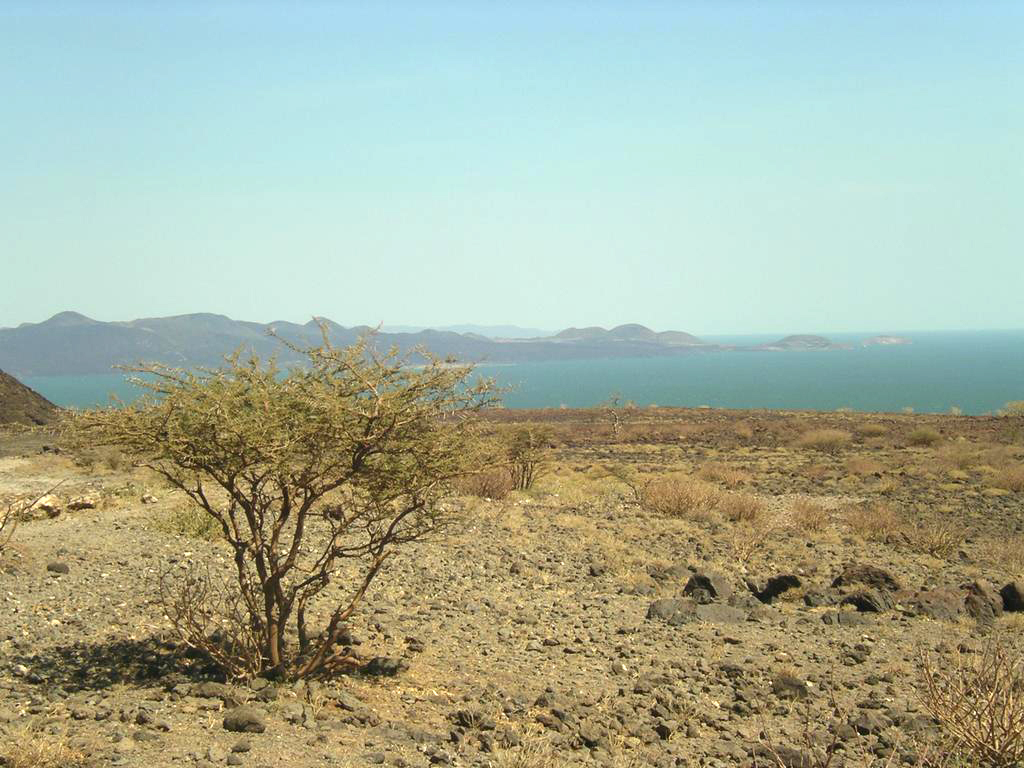

- Location within Kenya
- Location: Rift Valley Province, Kenya
- Coordinates: 03°57′38″N 36°20′33″E
- Area: 1,570.85 km^{2} (606.51 sq mi)
- Established: 1973
- Governing body: Kenya Wildlife Service

UNESCO World Heritage Site
- Part of: Lake Turkana National Parks
- Criteria: Natural: (viii)(x)
- Reference: 801bis-001
- Inscription: 1997 (21st Session)
- Extensions: 2001

Sibiloi National Park lies on the northeastern shore of Lake Turkana in northern Kenya. Established in 1973 by the government of Kenya for the protection of wildlife and paleontologist sites. It covers an area of 1,570 km^{2} (610 mi^{2}) and is internationally known for its fossils. It was listed as a UNESCO World Heritage Site in 1997 as a part of Lake Turkana National Parks.

Sibiloi National Park is located on the wild and rugged shores of Lake Turkana – the cradle of mankind - Sibiloi is home to important archaeological sites including Koobi Fora where the fossil remains found have contributed more to the understanding of human evolution than any other site on the continent. The area is characterized by a semi-desert habitat and open plains flanked by volcanic formations including Mount Sibiloi, where the remains of a petrified forest can be seen.

== Background ==
The park was named for Mount Sibiloi in view at Alia Bay on the south perimeter. Also there are the park headquarters of the Kenya Wildlife Service, plus camping and short-stay facilities for visitors; and the Koobi Fora Museum. Koobi Fora Spit with the facilities of the Koobi Fora research Center are to the north, but are accessible through guided tours.

The most famous remains from the park are the Australopithecus and early Homo fossils. These have been moved to Nairobi, but fossil non-humanoids are on display in the museum.

== See also ==
- Koobi Fora
- Lake Turkana
