= Lake Turkana National Parks =

Group of three national parks of Kenya

UNESCO World Heritage Site
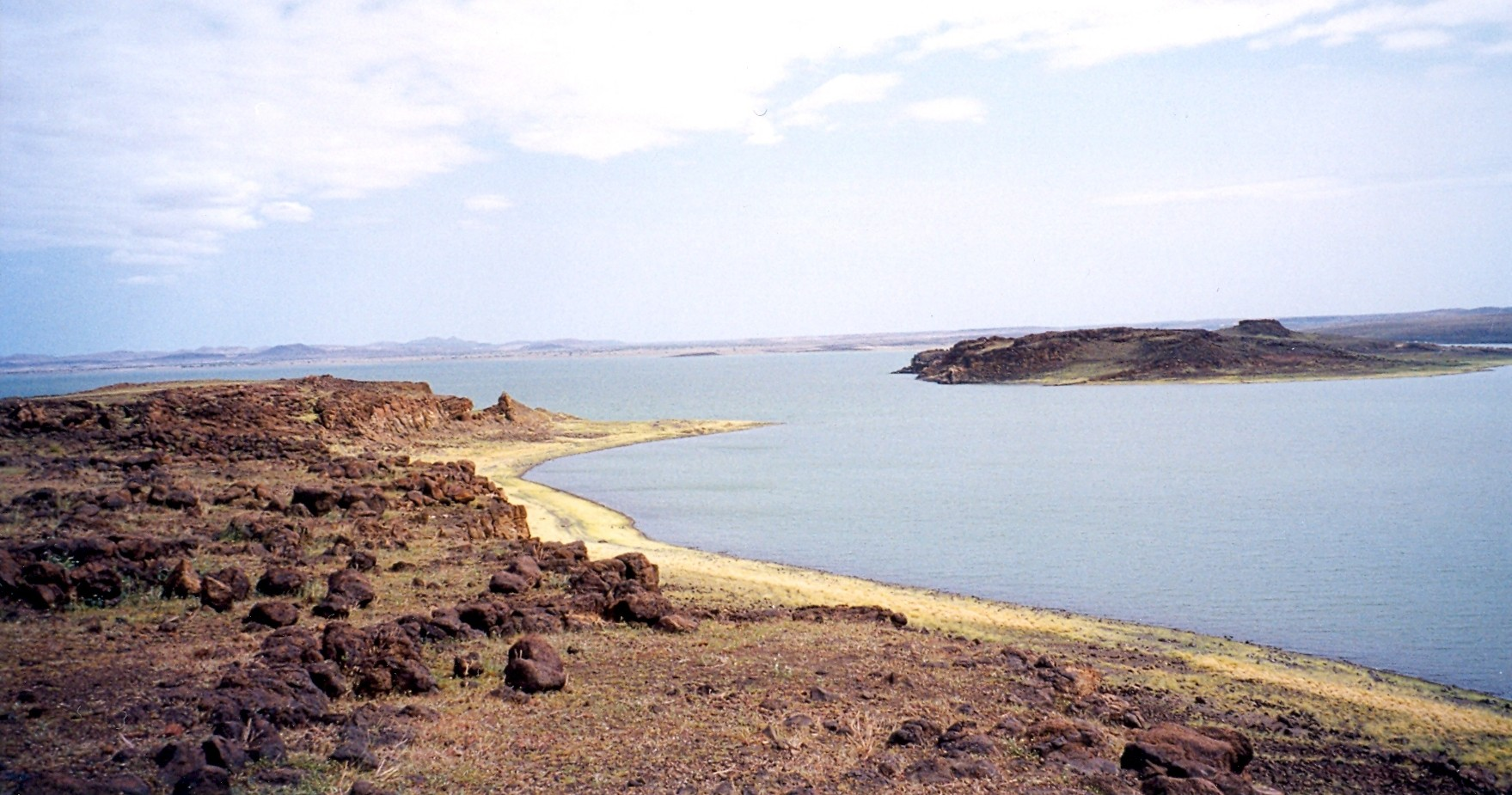

- Location within Kenya
- Location: Kenya
- Includes: 1. Sibiloi National Park; 2. Central Island; 3. South Island
- Criteria: Natural: (viii), (x)
- Reference: 801bis
- Inscription: 1997 (21st Session)
- Extensions: 2001
- Endangered: 2018–
- Area: 161,485 ha (399,040 acres)
- Coordinates: 3°3′4.7″N 36°30′13.2″E

Lake Turkana National Parks is a group of three national parks located around Lake Turkana in Kenya. It was inscribed as a UNESCO World Heritage Site in 1997 and expanded in 2001. Reasons for the park's importance include its use as a stopping point for migratory birds, as a breeding ground for the Nile crocodile, hippopotamus, and snakes. It also contains fossils in the Koobi Fora deposits which are unique in the world. Lake Turkana National Parks consist of Sibiloi National Park and two islands on Lake Turkana (Central Island and South Island).

== Gallery ==
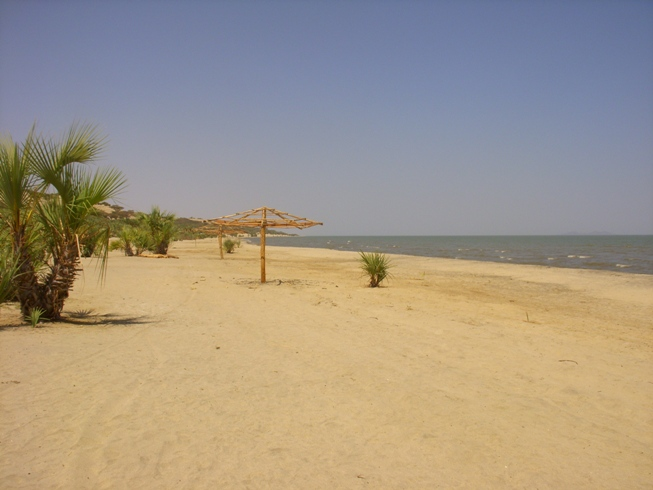
Beach At-Eliye Springs Hotel Resort On Lake Turkana

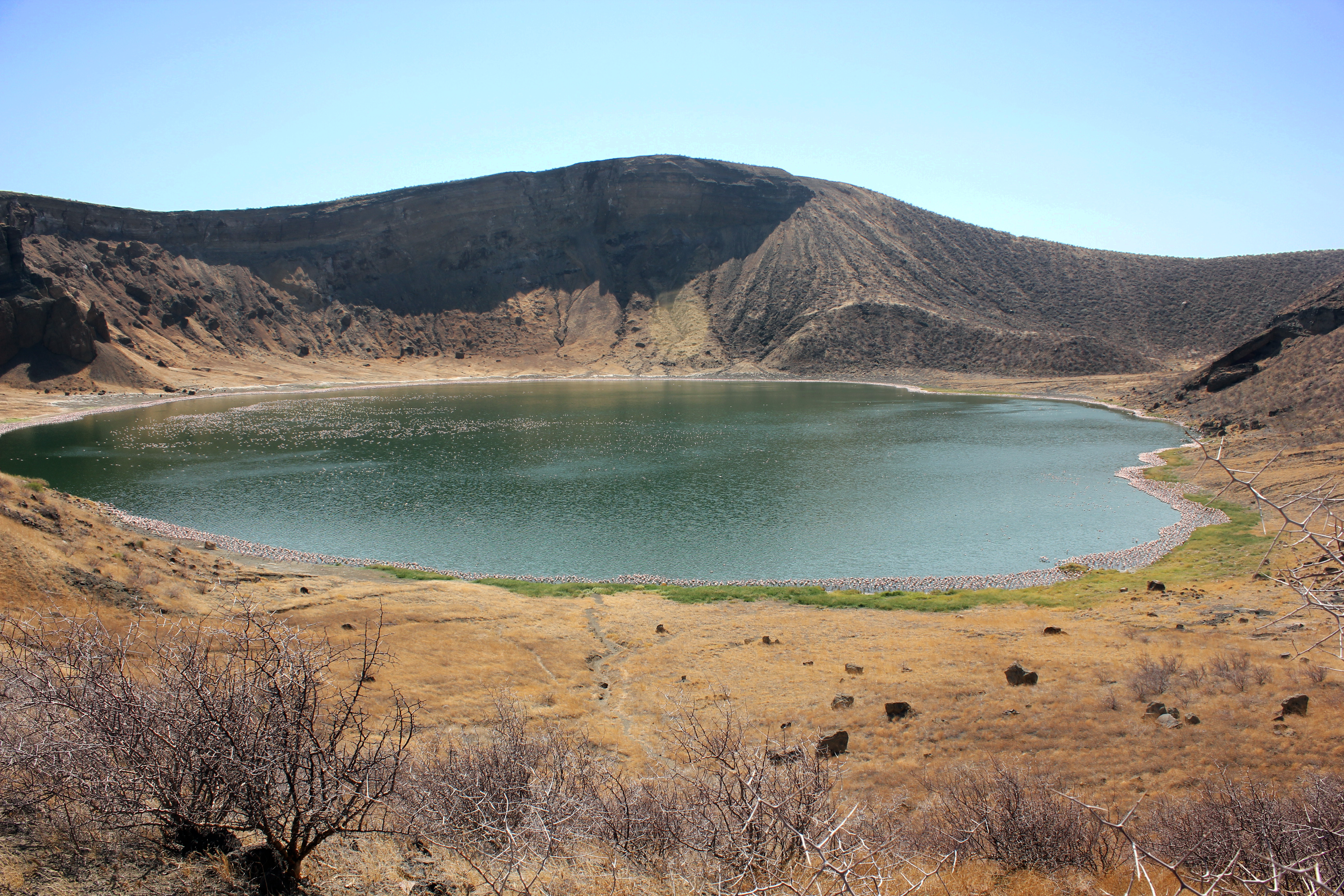
Flamingo Lake 01

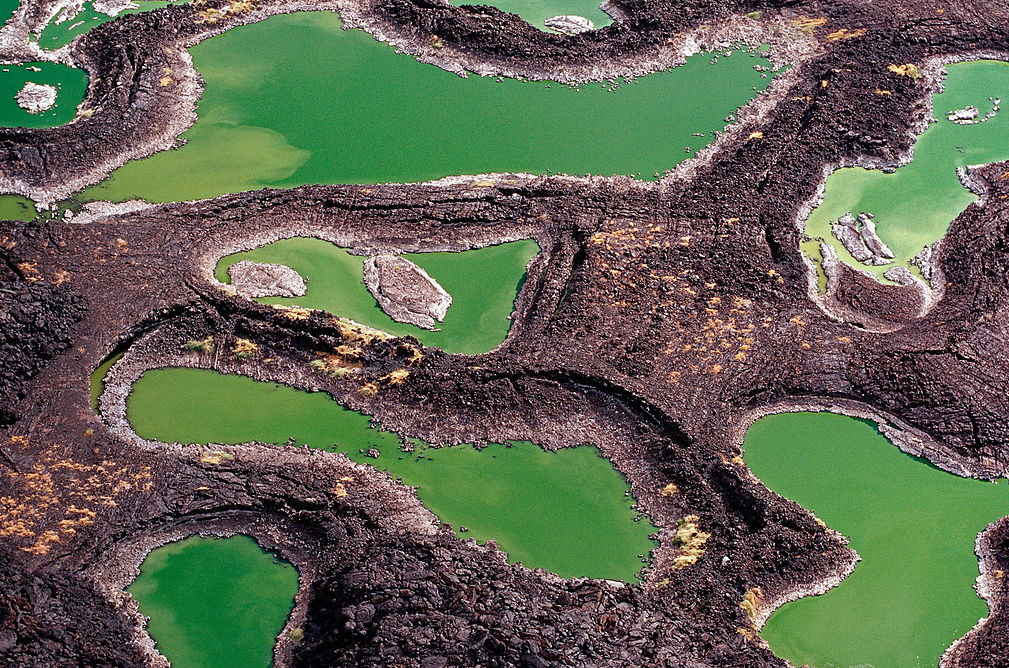
Series of lava rock pools at southern end of Lake Turkana

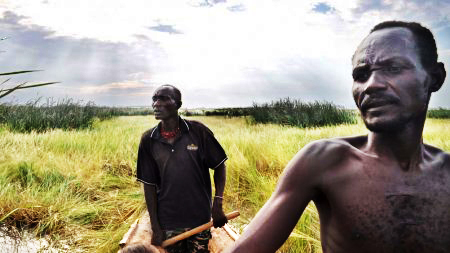
Turkana fishermen

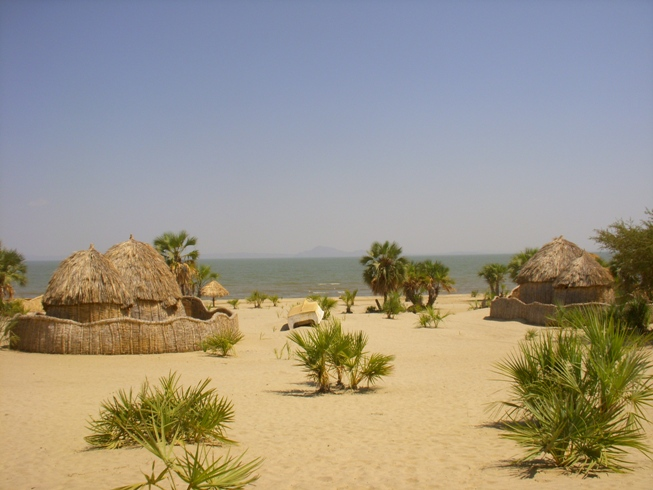
View Of Lake Turkana From Eliye Springs Hotel
