= Lake Turkana =

Alkaline lake on the border of Ethiopia and Kenya

- Swahili: Ziwa Turkana
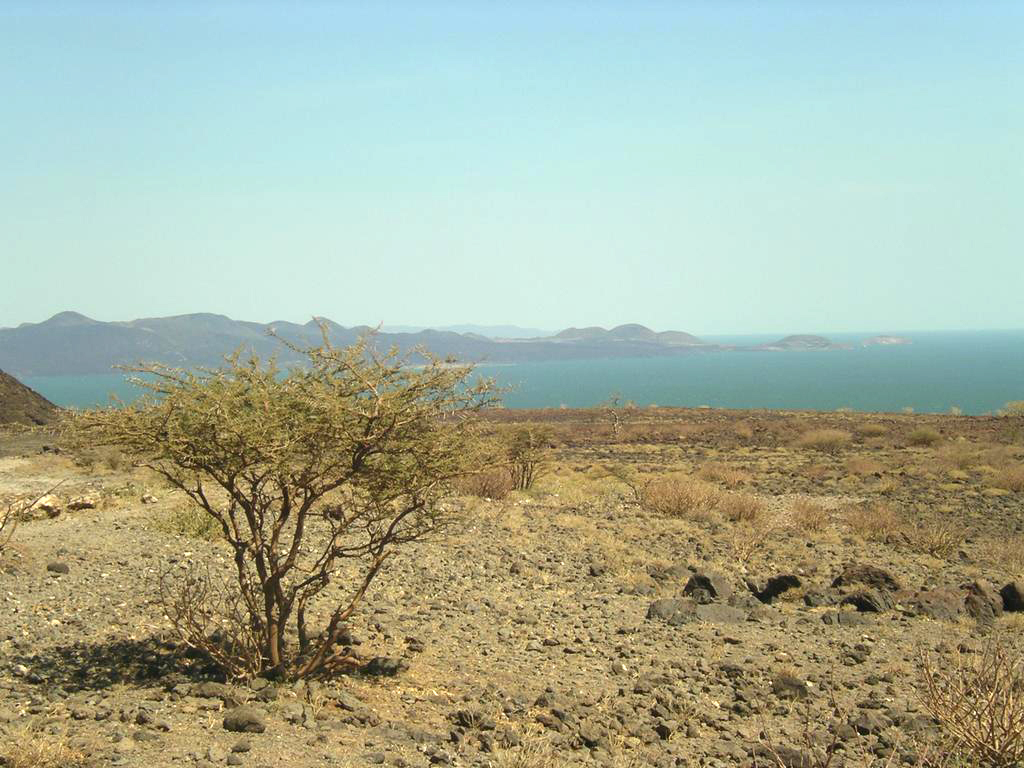

- Location within Kenya Location within Africa
- Interactive map of Lake Turkana
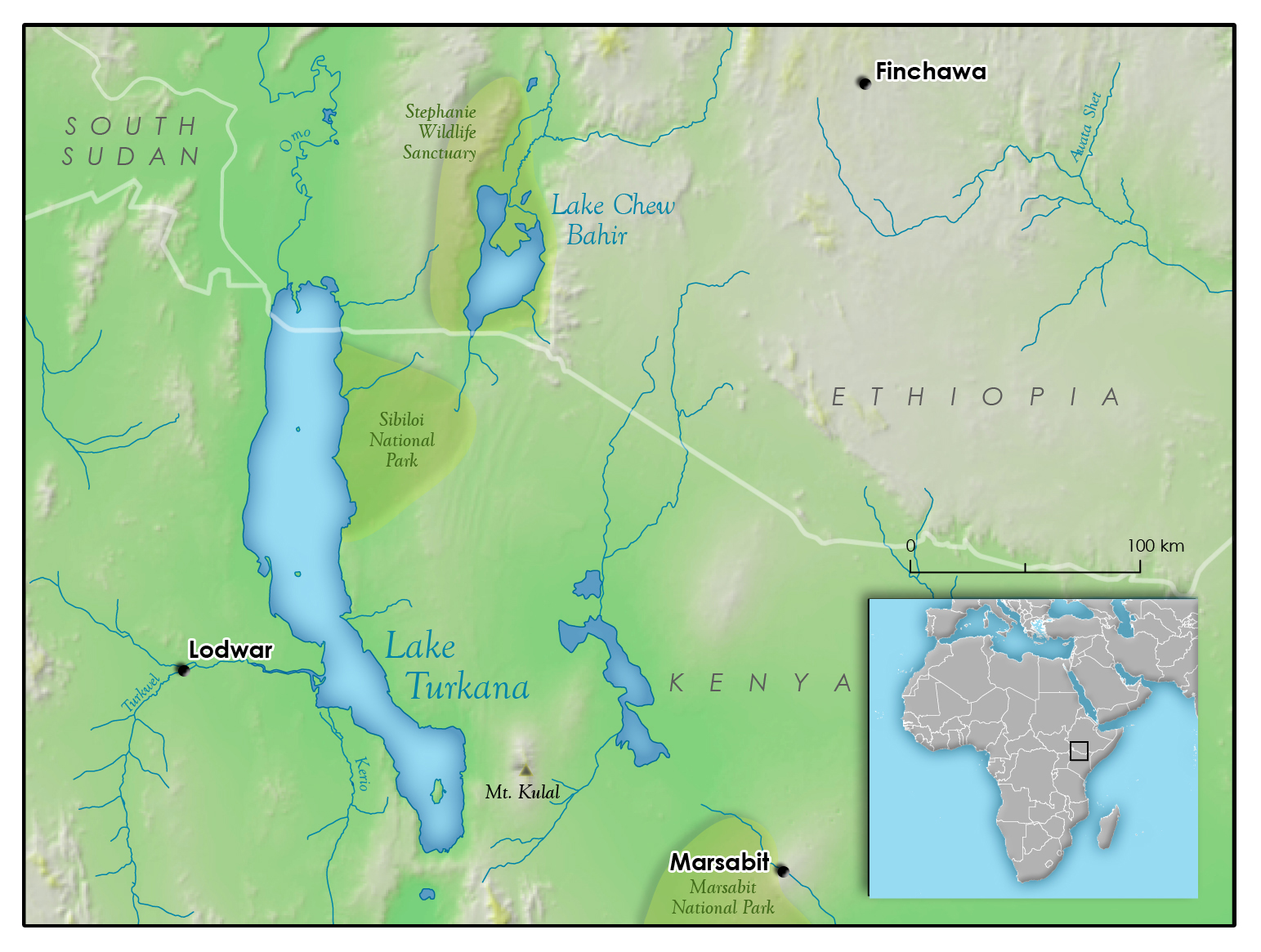
- Location: Northwestern Kenya and stick with Southwestern Ethiopia
- Coordinates: 3°35′N 36°7′E
- Lake type: Saline, monomictic, alkaline, endorheic
- Primary inflows: Omo River, Turkwel River, Kerio River
- Primary outflows: Evaporation
- Catchment area: 130,860 km^{2} (50,530 sq mi)
- Basin countries: Ethiopia, Kenya, South Sudan
- Max. length: 290 km (180 mi)
- Max. width: 32 km (20 mi)
- Surface area: 6,405 km^{2} (2,473 sq mi)
- Average depth: 30.2 m (99 ft)
- Max. depth: 109 m (358 ft)
- Water volume: 193 km^{3} (46 cu mi)
- Salinity: 0.244%
- Surface elevation: 360.4 m (1,182 ft)
- Islands: North Island, Central Island, South Island (volcanic)
- Settlements: El Molo, Loyangalani, Kalokol, Eliye Springs, Ileret, Fort Banya.
- References

UNESCO World Heritage Site
- Official name: Lake Turkana National Parks
- Criteria: Natural: viii, x
- Reference: 801
- Inscription: 1997 (21st Session)
- Extensions: 2001
- IUCN category II (national park)

Lake Turkana (/tɜːrˈkɑːnə, -ˈkæn-/Swahili: Ziwa Turkana) is a saline lake in the Kenyan Rift Valley, predominantly in northern Kenya; the far northern end crosses into Ethiopia. It is the world's largest permanent desert lake and the world's largest alkaline lake. By volume it is the world's fourth-largest salt lake after the Caspian Sea, Issyk-Kul, and Lake Van (passing the shrinking South Aral Sea), and among all lakes it ranks 22nd.

Lake Turkana is now threatened by the construction of the Gilgel Gibe III Dam in Ethiopia due to the damming of the Omo River which supplies most of the lake's water.

Although the lake commonly has been—and to some degree still is—used for drinking water, its salinity (slightly brackish) and very high levels of fluoride (much higher than in fluoridated water) generally make it unsuitable for drinking; it has also been a source of diseases spread by contaminated water. Increasingly, communities around the lake rely on underground springs for drinking water. The same characteristics that make it unsuitable for drinking limit its use for irrigation. The climate is hot and very dry.

The rocks of the surrounding area are predominantly volcanic. Central Island is an active volcano, emitting vapour. Outcrops and rocky shores are found on the east and southern shores of the lake, while dunes, spits and flats are on the west and north, at a lower elevation.

On-shore and off-shore winds can be extremely strong, as the lake warms and cools more slowly than the land. Sudden, violent storms are frequent. Three rivers (the Omo, Turkwel and Kerio) flow into the lake, but lacking outflow, its only water loss is by evaporation. Lake volume and dimensions vary. For example, the level fell by 10 metres (33 ft) between 1975 and 1993. Despite the lack of outflow, in ecology it is often regarded as a part of — or at least associated with — the Nile basin because of its prehistoric connection to this system and the similarities in their aquatic faunas.

Due to local temperatures — the lake water is 27–31 °C [81–88 °F], and the mean air temperature of the region is similar or slightly higher — aridity and geographic inaccessibility, the lake retains its wild character. Nile crocodiles are found in great abundance on the shore flats. The rocky shores are home to scorpions and carpet vipers. The lake is rich in fish and fishing is very important to the local economy, but is threatened by falling water levels and overfishing.

Lake Turkana National Parks are now listed as a UNESCO World Heritage Site. Sibiloi National Park lies on the lake's eastern shore, while Central Island National Park and South Island National Park lie in the lake. Both are known for their Nile crocodiles.

An abundance of hominid fossils have been discovered in the area surrounding Lake Turkana.

The area sees few visitors, being a two day drive from Nairobi. The lake is also an imaginary boundary of the Rendille and Borana and Oromo to the Turkana land. The area is primarily clay-based and is more alkaline than seawater.

== Toponymy ==
After the independence of Kenya, the president, Mzee Jomo Kenyatta, renamed it in 1975 after the Turkana, the predominant tribe there. The Turkana refer to the lake as Anam Ka'alakol, meaning "the sea of many fish". It is from the name Ka'alakol that Kalokol, a town on the western shore of Lake Turkana, east of Lodwar, derives its name. The previous indigenous Turkana name for Lake Turkana was Anam a Cheper. Natives who live around Lake Turkana include the Turkana, Rendille, Gabbra, Daasanach, Hamar Koke, Karo, Nyagatom, Mursi, Surma, and Molo peoples. For the location of many of these peoples refer to the dialect map in the article.

=== Lake Rudolf ===
The lake was originally named Lake Rudolf (in honour of Crown Prince Rudolf of Austria) by Count Sámuel Teleki de Szék and his second-in-command Lieutenant Ludwig Ritter Von Höhnel, a Hungarian and an Austrian, on 6 March 1888. They were the first Europeans to have recorded visiting the lake after a long safari across East Africa. The lake kept its European name during the colonial period of British East Africa. However, the existence of the lake and its shape and location were well known in Europe long before Teleki conceived of his visit.

=== Jade Sea ===
At some unknown time, the lake acquired an alternative name as the Jade Sea from its turquoise colour seen approaching from a distance. The colour comes from algae that rise to the surface in calm weather. This is likely also a European name.

=== Basso Narok ===
J. W. Gregory reported in The Geographical Journal of 1894 that it was called "Basso Narok", meaning "Black Lake" in the Samburu language. Likewise, the nearby Ethiopian Lake Chew Bahir is called "Basso Naibor" in Samburu, meaning "White Lake". The Samburu are among the dominant tribes in the lake Turkana region when the explorers came. What the native form of this phrase was, what it might mean, and in which language is not clear.

== Biology ==
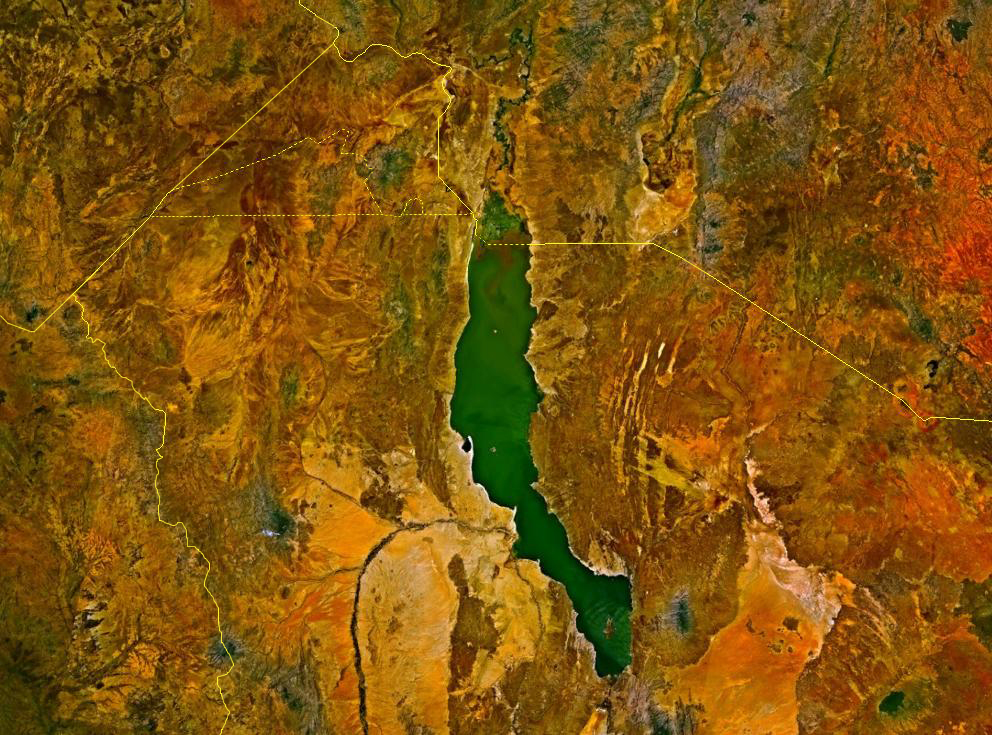
Satellite image of Lake Turkana, distinguishable by its jade colour. The Omo River enters at the top. The river visible on the lower left is the Turkwel, which has been dammed for hydroelectric power.

=== Biomes ===
The major biomes are the lake itself, which is an aquatic biome, and the surrounding region, which is classified as desert and xeric shrubland. The Chalbi Desert is east of the lake. During moister times, a dry grassland appears, featuring Aristida adscensionis and A. mutabilis. During drier times, the grass disappears. The shrublands contain dwarf shrubs, such as Duosperma eremophilum and Indigofera spinosa. Near the lake are doum palms.

=== Plankton ===
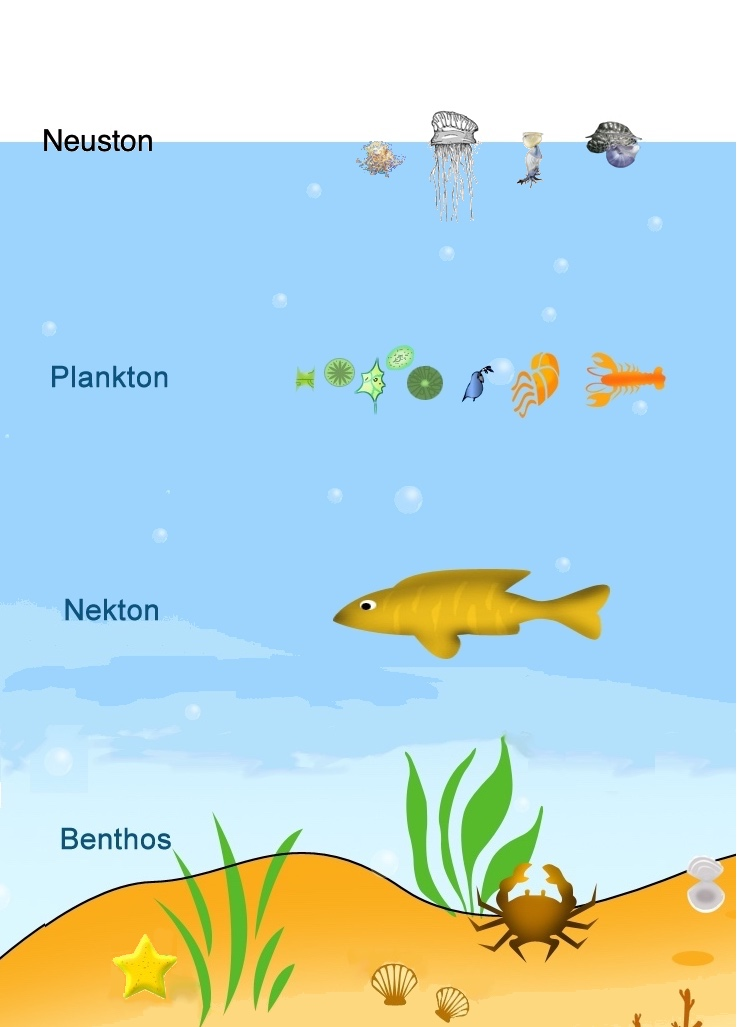
Layers of the lake

Both phytoplankton and zooplankton are found in the lake. Of the former, cyanobacteria are represented by Microcystis aeruginosa and microalgae by Botryococcus braunii. Also present are Anabaenopsis arnoldii, Planctonema lauterbornii, Oocystis gigas, Sphaerocystis schroeteri, and some others. The zooplankton includes copepods, cladocerans and protozoans.

=== Fish ===
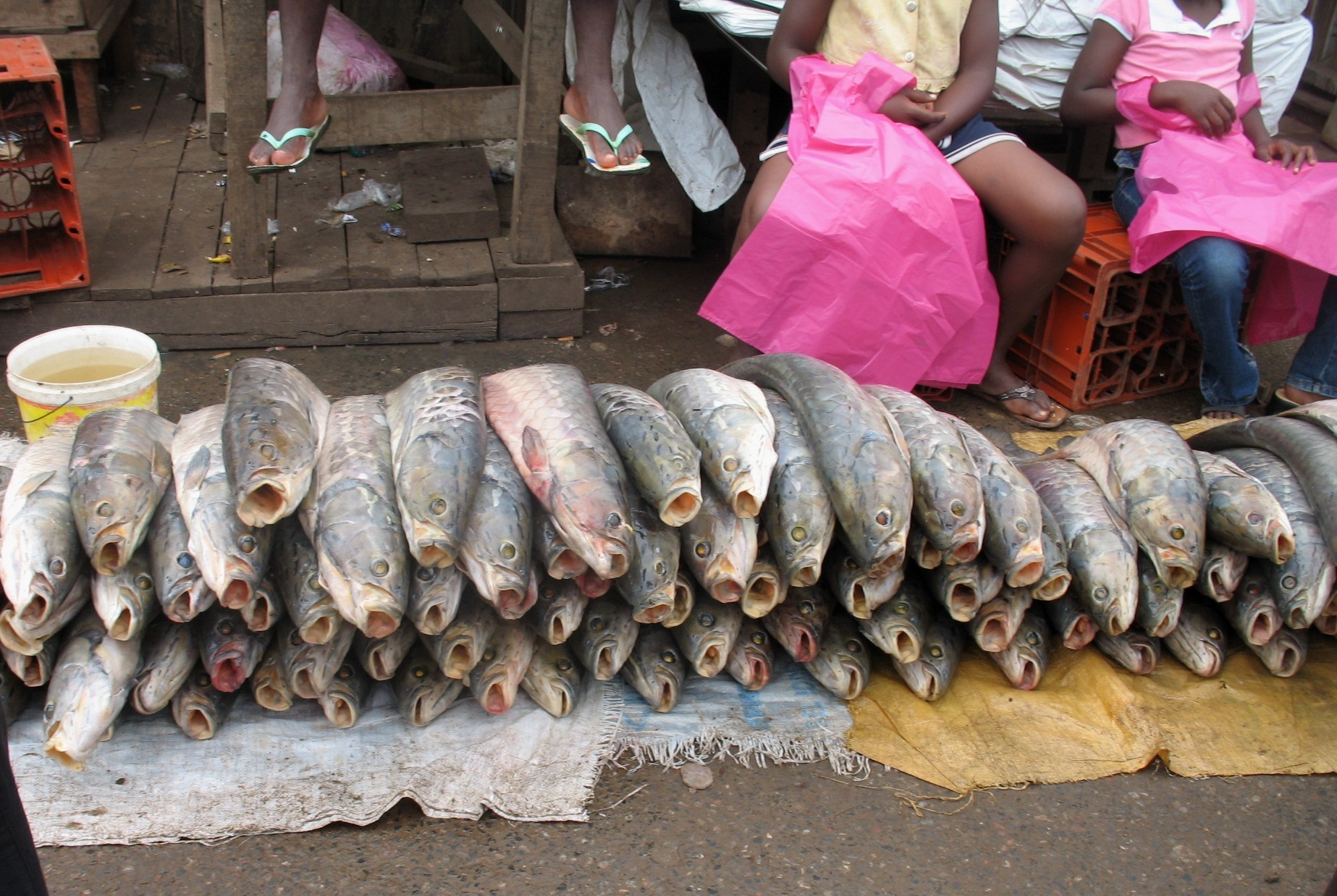
African arowana (Heterotis niloticus) an example of fish species at Lake Turkana

Compared to other large African lakes, Turkana has relatively few fish species. The lake holds about 50 fish species, including 12 endemics: the cichlids Haplochromis macconneli, H. rudolfianus, H. turkanae and Hemichromis exsul, the barb Enteromius turkanae, the catfish Chrysichthys turkana, the robber tetras Brycinus ferox and B. minutus, the Rudolf lates Lates longispinis, the lampeyes Lacustricola jeanneli and Micropanchax rudolfianus, and the cyprinid Neobola stellae. Non-endemics include species such as Nile tilapia, mango tilapia, bichirs, the elephantfish Mormyrus kannume, African arowana, African knifefish, Distichodus niloticus, the Nile perch and numerous others. During the early Holocene, the water level of the lake was higher, and it overflowed into the Nile River, allowing fish and crocodiles access. Consequently, the non-endemic fishes in the lake are mainly riverine species of Nilotic origin. Some of the non-endemics do not breed in the lake, but migrate up the Omo River and other affluents to breed. The lake is heavily fished.

=== Birds ===
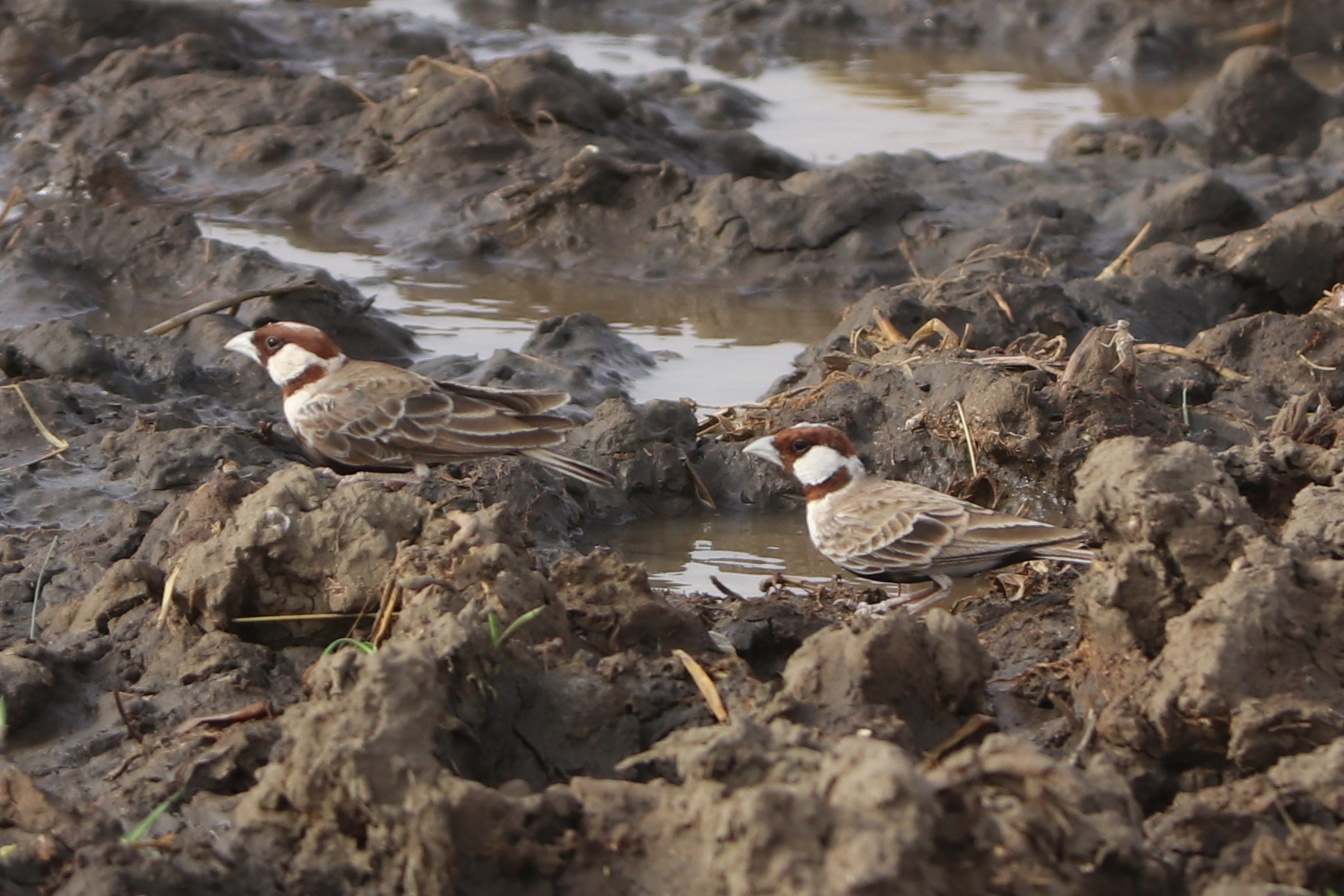
Chestnut-headed sparrow-lark (Eremopterix signatus)

The Lake Turkana region is home to hundreds of species of birds native to Kenya. The East African Rift System also serves as a flyway for migrating birds, bringing in hundreds more. The birds are essentially supported by plankton masses in the lake, which also feed the fish.

Some birds more common to Turkana are the little stint, the wood sandpiper, and the common sandpiper. The African skimmer (Rhyncops flavirostris) nests in the banks of Central Island. The white-breasted cormorant (Phalacrocorax lucidus) ranges over the lake, as do many other waterbirds. The greater flamingo wades in its shallows. Heuglin's bustard (Neotis heuglinii) is found in the east of the lake region.

=== Reptiles ===
The lake formerly contained Africa's largest population of Nile crocodiles: 14,000, as estimated in a 1968 study by Alistair Graham.

The lake also has a large population of large water turtles, particularly in the area of Central Island. The Turkana mud turtle is endemic to the lake.

=== Mammals ===
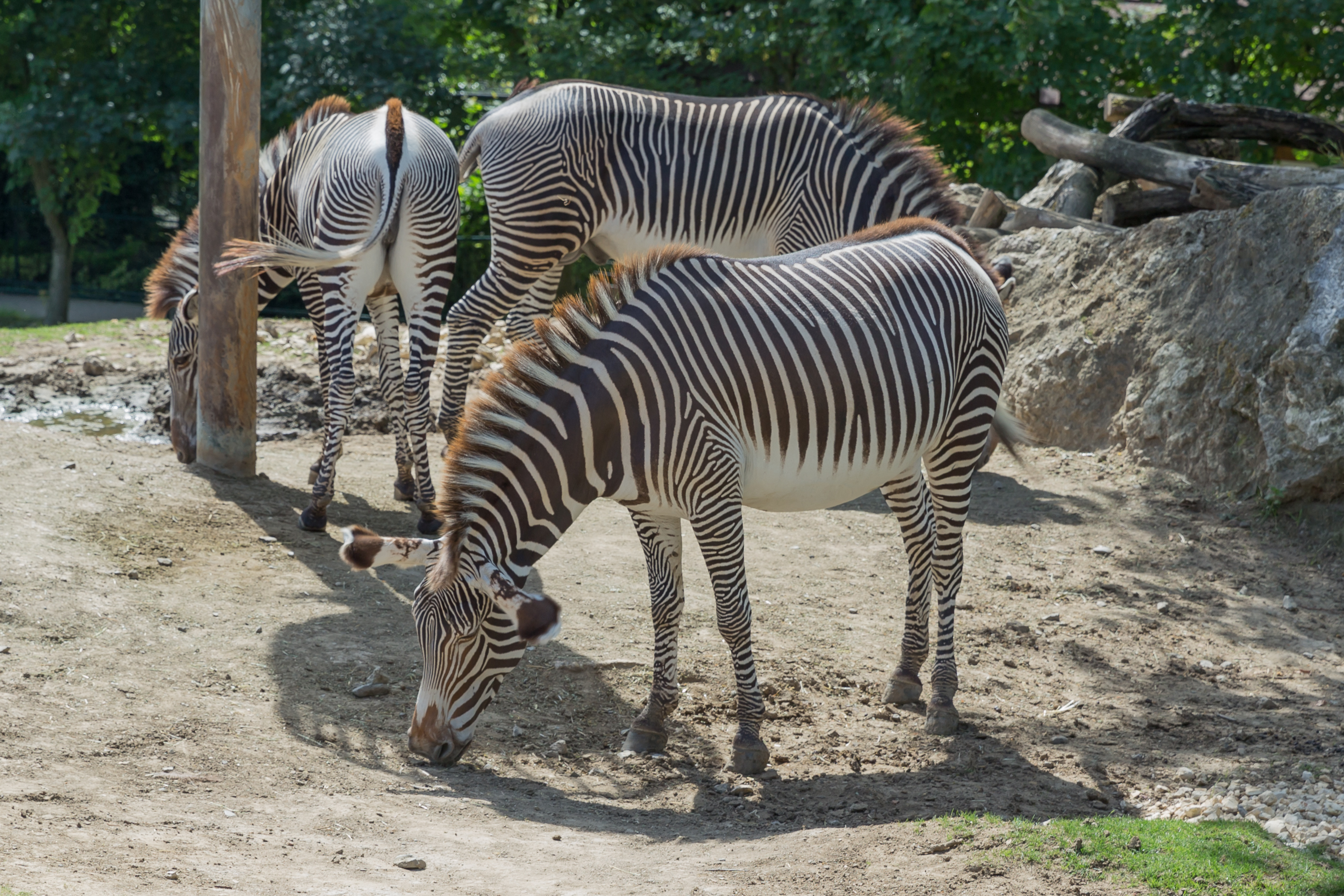
Grévy's zebras

Over the dry grasslands ranges a frail population of grazing mammals and predators. The grazers are chiefly Grévy's zebra, Burchell's zebra, the beisa oryx, Grant's gazelle, the topi and the reticulated giraffe. They are hunted by the lion and the cheetah. Elephants and the black rhinoceroses are no longer seen, although Teleki reported seeing (and shooting) many. Closer to the dust is the cushioned gerbil (Gerbillus pulvinatus).

== Geology ==
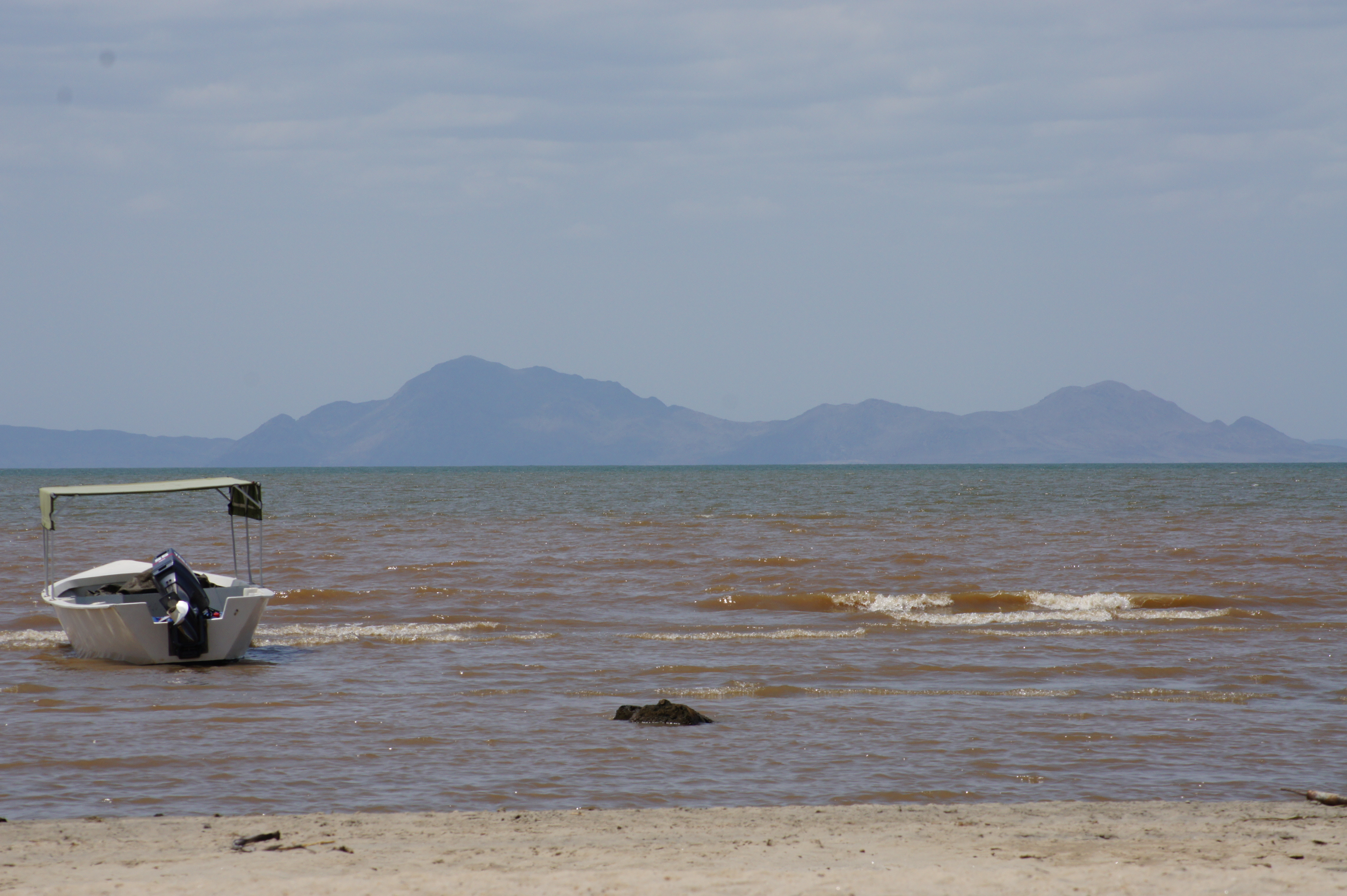
View of Lake Turkana with the Koobi Fora formations in the background.

Lake Turkana is an East African Rift feature. A rift is a weak place in the Earth's crust due to the separation of two tectonic plates, often accompanied by a graben, or trough, in which lake water can collect. The rift began when East Africa, impelled by currents in the mantle, began separating from the rest of Africa, moving to the northeast. Currently, the graben is 320 km wide in the north of the lake, 170 km in the south. This rift is one of two, and is called the Great or Eastern Rift. There is another to the west, the Western Rift.

Lake Turkana is the world's largest permanent desert lake. Its surrounding basin is also internationally important for its fossil deposits, which have contributed significantly to research into human evolution.

Lake Turkana is a unique feature of the East African landscape. Besides being a permanent desert lake, it is the only lake that retains water originating from two separate catchment areas of the Nile. The Lake Turkana drainage basin draws its waters mainly from the Kenya Highlands and Ethiopian Highlands.

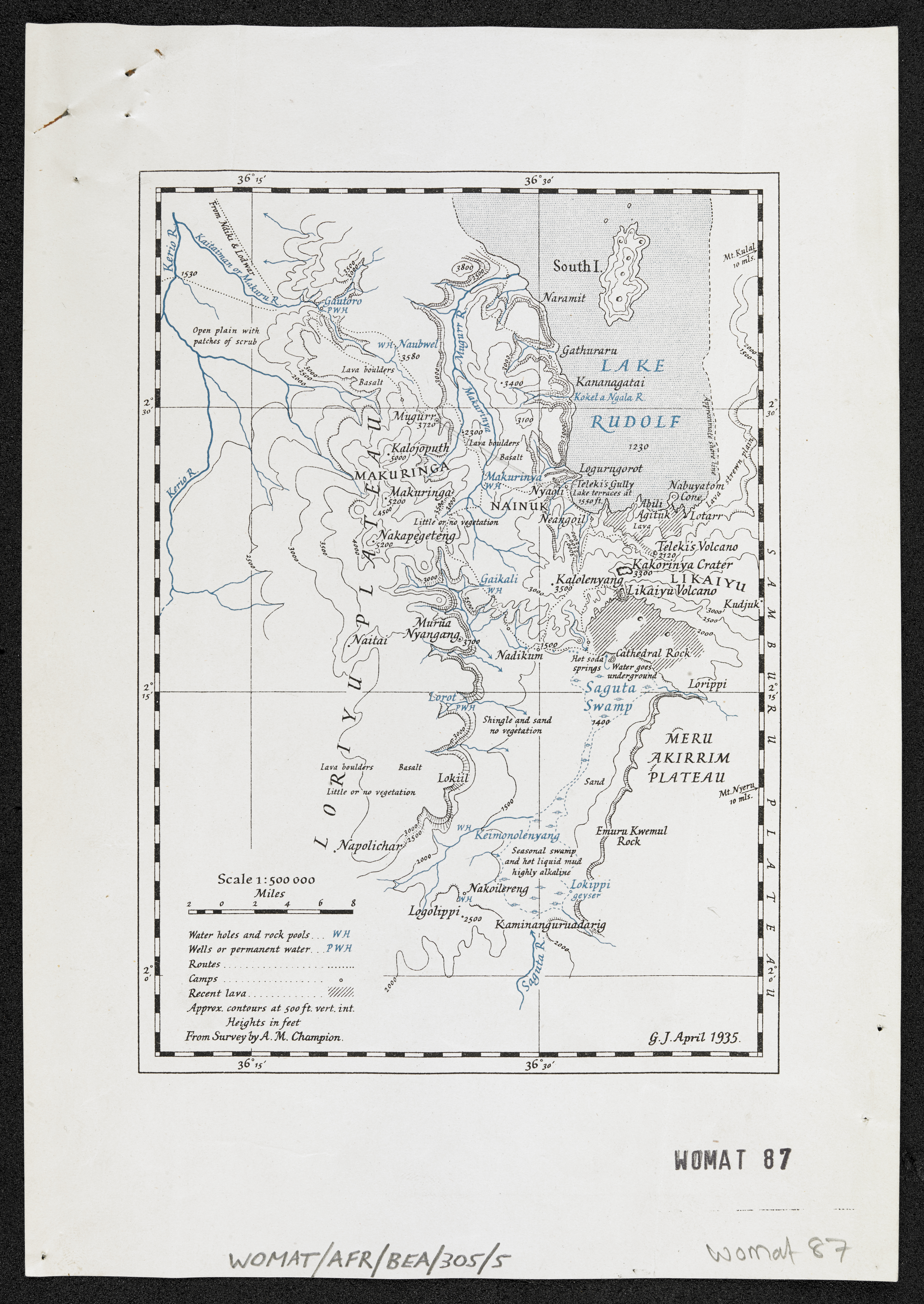
A map of Lake Turkana

The basement rocks of the region have been dated by two analytical determinations to 522 and 510 million years ago (mya). No rift was in the offing at that time. A rift is signalled by volcanic activity through the weakened crust. The oldest volcanic activity of the region occurred in the Nabwal Hills northeast of Turkana and is dated to 34.8 mya in the late Eocene.

The visible tectonic features of the region result from extensive extrusions of basalt over the Turkana-Omo basin in the window 4.18–3.99 mya. These are called the Gombe Group Basalts. They are subdivided into the Mursi Basalts and the Gombi Basalts.

The two latter basalts are identified as the outcrops forming the rocky mountains and badlands around the lake. In the Omo portion of the basin, of the Mursi Basalts, the Mursi Formation is on the west side of the Omo, the Nkalabong on the Omo, and the Usno and Shungura east of the Omo. Probably the best known of the formations are the Koobi Fora on the east side of Turkana and the Nachukui on the west.

Short-term fluctuations in lake level combined with periodic volcanic ash spewings over the region have resulted in a fortuitous layering of the ground cover over the basal rocks. These horizons can be dated more precisely by chemical analysis of the tuff. As this region is believed to have been an evolutionary nest of hominins, the dates are important for generating a diachronic array of fossils, both hominoid and nonhominoid—that is, both ape (includes hominins) and non-ape. Many thousands have been excavated.

Terraces representing ancient shores are visible in the Turkana Basin. The highest is 100 m above the surface of the lake (only approximate, as the lake level fluctuates), which occurred about 9500 years ago, at the end of the Pleistocene as part of the African humid period. It is generally theorised that Turkana was part of the upper Nile system at that time, connecting to Lake Baringo at the southern end and the White Nile in the north, and that volcanic land adjustments severed the connection. Such a hypothesis explains the Nile species in the lake, such as the crocodiles and the Nile perch. High water levels also occurred approximately 9000, 6000 and 5000 years ago, each of which were followed by drops in lake level of more than 40m in less than 200 years. It is thought that changes in the position of the Congo Air Boundary affected the ability of moisture from the Atlantic Ocean to reach eastern Africa, which had a profound influence on the level of Lake Turkana and adjacent water bodies.

The archaeoastronomical site Namoratunga, which has been dated to circa 300 BCE, is located near Lake Turkana.

== Anthropology ==
Hominin fossils of some of the earliest human ancestors have been found in the Turkana Basin. Lake Turkana is considered the cradle of human life because of the diverse hominid species found living millions of years apart in this desert landscape. These fossils have facilitated human understanding of the dynamic human evolution process and imply that they descended from more than one common ancestor, diverging into multiple lineages.

The changing forest environment forced the early humans to adapt to a more open grassland that increased their exposure to threatening predators. Volcanic ash and drier climates were ideal for preserving these human fossils but it also caused the lake to shrink or disappear at times.

In a dry riverbed, the Lomekwi 3 site recovered primitive hammers, anvils, and cutting tools. However, the emergence of Acheulean technology no longer assumes that tool use was a distinguishing factor among Homo species as Australopithecus afarensis were also using simple tools prior to the appearance of the genus Homo, over 3.3 million years ago.

Australopithecus anamensis fossils discovered by Meave Leakey in 1994 date to around 4 million years ago, setting the beginning date of bipedalism back half a million years. Richard Leakey has led numerous anthropological expeditions in the area which have led to many important discoveries of hominin remains.

The two-million-year-old skull 1470 was found in 1972. It was originally thought to be Homo habilis, but the scientific name Homo rudolfensis, derived from the old name of this lake (Rudolf) was proposed in 1986 by V. P. Alexeev. In 1984, the Turkana Boy, a nearly complete skeleton of a Homo ergaster juvenile, was discovered by Kamoya Kimeu. More recently, Meave Leakey discovered a 3.5 million-year-old skull there, designated Kenyanthropus platyops ("the flat-faced man of Kenya").

Marta Mirazón Lahr discovered early evidence of human warfare at the site of Nataruk, located near the shore of an ancient and larger Lake Turkana, and where numerous human skeletons showing major traumatic injuries to the head, neck, ribs, knees and hands are argued to be evidence of inter-group conflict between nomadic hunter-gatherers 10,000 years ago. With over 230 individuals found at the Koobi Fora site along the western shore, and scattered Homo sapiens skeletons with bone marks along the eastern shore at the Nataruk Site, this region provides considerable insight to the way these early humans thrived and survived the inconsistent climate along the lake shore and beyond.

Homo erectus is the closest of Homo sapiens' ancestors and contended to be the first hominin to cross the Levantine corridor out of Africa into Europe and Asia 1.8 million years ago.

Many language groups are represented in the area around Lake Turkana, which is evidence for numerous migrations of diverse people over thousands of years. The current language groups include at least three separate subgroups of the Nilotic (Nilo-Saharan) and Cushitic (Afro-Asiatic) language families, which have further subdivided into more than 12 languages surrounding the lake today. In the early Holocene (during the Holocene Climatic Optimum), lake levels were high and fishing and foraging were the primary subsistence economies. This was mostly supplanted by animal-based agriculture by 5000 years ago, when the lake level was in a period of rapid fluctuation. During the later Holocene, human responses to climatic changes included intensive fishing when lake level was high and a shift to cattle herding when the level dropped. Megalithic graves are found widely distributed on the lake shores and appear to correspond to the period when domesticated animals were first introduced to the region about 5000 years ago, while later, the dead were buried in small grave cairns. People who live in the region today commonly practice mixed subsistence, switching between hunting, fishing and animal herding based on what is feasible in a given year. However, the construction of infrastructure like Christian missionary stations, energy extraction (wind, oil) and NGO aid distribution points have made the region more connected to and dependent on outside resources for subsistence. Traditional modes of subsistence like pastoralism and fishing are now supplemented by the cash-based economy.

== Wind power ==
The Lake Turkana Wind Power Project (LTWP) provides 310 MW of power to Kenya's national electricity grid by tapping the unique wind conditions around the lake. There are 365 wind turbines, each with a nameplate capacity of 850 kilowatts. It was commissioned in October 2018.

Full commercial operation was achieved in July 2019 when the power lines delivering the outpurt were completed. 100% Capacity Factor (meaning full 310 MW generated) was achieved in March 2021.

== Dams ==
The Gibe III dam is already under construction by Ethiopia along its Omo River, with general recognition that it will cause a major decrease in river flow downstream and a serious reduction of inflow to Kenya's Lake Turkana, which receives 90 percent of its waters from the river. According to the ARWG report, these changes will destroy the survival means of at least 200,000 pastoralists, flood-dependent agriculturalists and fishers along the Omo River and 300,000 pastoralists and fishers around the shores of Lake Turkana – plunging the region's ethnic groups into cross-border violent conflict reaching well into South Sudan, as starvation confronts all of them.

The report offers a devastating look at a deeply flawed development process fuelled by the special interests of global finance and African governments. In the process, it identifies major overlooked or otherwise minimised risks, not the least of which is a U.S. Geological Survey estimation of a high risk for a magnitude 7 or 8 earthquake in the Gibe III dam region.

=== Impact on Lake Turkana ===
The magnitude of the impact that the dam and possible irrigation projects induced by the dam will have on the water level of Lake Turkana is controversial. A hydrological study conducted for the African Development Bank in November 2010 concluded that the filling of the dam will reduce the lake's water level by two metres, if no irrigation will be undertaken. Irrigation would cause a further drop in the lake level.[29]

Friends of Lake Turkana, a Kenyan organisation representing indigenous groups in northwestern Kenya whose livelihoods are linked to Lake Turkana, had previously estimated that the dam could reduce the level of Lake Turkana by up to 10 meter affecting up to 300,000 people.[30] This could cause the brackish water to increase in salinity to where it may no longer be drinkable by the indigenous groups around the lake. Currently, the salinity of the water is about 2332 mg/L, and it is estimated that a 10-meter decrease in the water level of Lake Turkana could cause the salinity to rise to 3397 mg/L.[20] Raising salinity could also drastically reduce the number of fish in the lake, which the people around Lake Turkana depend on for sustenance and their livelihoods. According to critics, this "will condemn the lake to a not-so-slow death."[9]

According to dam proponents, the impact on Lake Turkana will be limited to the temporary reduction in flows during the filling of the reservoir. Various sources state that the filling could take between one and three wet seasons.[9][26] The total storage volume of the reservoir of Gibe III dam will be between 11.75 and 14 billion cubic meter, depending on sources. According to the firm that builds the dam this would reduce the water level in the lake by "less than 50 cm per year for three years" and that salinity "will not change in any way".[26]

According to the International Lake Environment Committee, 90% of Lake Turkana's water is delivered by the Omo River on which the Dam would be built.[31] With no outlet, Lake Turkana loses 2.3 meters of water every year to evaporation, and its level is sensitive to climatic and seasonal fluctuations. For purposes of comparison, the historic level of Lake Turkana declined from a high of 20m above today's level in the 1890s to the same level as today in the 1940s and 1950s. Then it increased again gradually by 7 metres to reach a peak around 1980, and subsequently decreased again.[31]

The Environmental and Social Impact Assessment (ESIA) summary of the project did not assess the impact of the dam on the water level and water quality of Lake Turkana.[32] The director of Kenya's Water Services Regulatory Board, John Nyaoro, argued that the dam would have no negative impact on Lake Turkana.[33]

A Kenya Government report in 2021 estimated that the surface area of Lake Turkana had increased by 10% between 2010 and 2020.

== See also ==
- Gilgel Gibe III Dam
- Hadar, Ethiopia
- Laetoli
- Lake Suguta
- List of rivers of Kenya
- Middle Awash
- Olduvai Gorge
- Omo Kibish Formation
- Rift Valley lakes
- Tugen Hills

== In popular culture ==
- Lake Turkana is featured in the 2002 video game Xenosaga Episode I: Der Wille zur Macht. In the game's prologue, set in 20XX AD, an archaeological expedition at Lake Turkana uncovers the Zohar, a mysterious monolith that serves as a central element in the game's story.
- The lake's eastern shore (in Loiyangalani) was the setting for John le Carré's novel The Constant Gardener, and was also a location for the film of the same title.
- Part of the events in the novel "Невозвращенец" ("The Non-Returnee") by Andrei Gusev takes place on the shores of Lake Turkana in Loiyangalani (in the second part of this novel).

== Sources ==
- Encyclopædia Britannica under "Rudolf, Lake"
- Chambers World Gazetteer, ed. David Munro, W & R Chambers Ltd. & The Press Syndicate of the University of Cambridge, 5th Edition, 1988, ISBN 978-1-85296-200-5 under Turkana, Lake.
- Quest for the Jade Sea: Colonial Competition Around an East African Lake, by Pascal James Imperato and published by Westview Press, 1998 ISBN 0813327911.
- Where Giants Trod: The Saga of Kenya's Desert Lake, by Monty Brown and published by Quiller Press, 1989 ISBN 1870948254. Descriptions of the various discovery expeditions to Lake Turkana in the 19th century. The accounts inevitably offer observations about the geology and anthropology of the area.
- Britannica, The Editors of Encyclopaedia. "Lake Turkana remains". Encyclopedia Britannica, 21 Jan. 2016, https://www.britannica.com/topic/Lake-Turkana-remains. Accessed 30 May 2022.
- Bush, Eliot. "The Meaning of Time in the Place Where Humanity's Earliest Ancestors Arose". Scientific American, 27 Jun. 2020, https://www.scientificamerican.com/article/the-meaning-of-time-in-the-place-where-humanitys-earliest-ancestors-arose/.
- Herrero, Hannah. "Discoveries at Lake Turkana". National Geographic, 20 May 2022, https://education.nationalgeographic.org/resource/discoveries-lake-turkana.
- Hogenboom, Melissa. "The Importance of Lake Turkana". Bradshaw Foundation, 9 Dec. 2015, https://www.bradshawfoundation.com/news/index.php?id=The-Importance-of-Lake-Turkana.
