= Manemanya Pillar Site =

Archaeological site in Kenya

Manemanya (GcJh5) is an archaeological site within the Lake Turkana basin in northern Kenya. It is a communal burial site built almost 5,000 years ago and is associated with the advent of pastoralism in eastern Africa during the Pastoral Neolithic period. Manemanya is located 1 km east of Lesodok hill, on the western shores of Lake Turkana. Comprising nine pillar clusters situated across two distinct zones, this site lacks evident platform mounds or cairns. However, its distinctiveness is marked by the presence of cobbles in the central area, a distinguishing feature that sets it apart from the natural surface surrounding the site, presenting a notable contrast with other pillar sites in the Lake Turkana basin.

Based on radiocarbon dating, the site is believed to be contemporaneous with Lothagam North, and Lothagam West pillar sites located on the western shores and Jarigole pillar site located on the eastern shores of Lake Turkana.

== History of excavation ==
The excavations at Manemanya were relatively limited in scope, primarily centered on a singular burial entwined with the feet of an arthritic adult. The initial exploration, conducted as part of the Later Prehistory of West Turkana project in 2009, unveiled the remains of a young, tall female exhibiting facial and jaw asymmetries that likely influenced both her appearance and physical capabilities. The burial of this individual was accompanied by a rich array of material culture, featuring an impressive collection of 330 stone beads and over 10,000 ostrich eggshell (OES) beads. The individual also wore ornaments pendants on her upper torso made from lions (Panthera leo) and hyena (Hyaena hyaena), and a bracelet of 42 canid (Canid sp) around her left wrist and ivory bangle on her right wrist. The stone beads made of different materials from Lothagam North are exclusively made of calcite and one from sandstone.

Ceramics found at the site include 11 sherds with 6 undecorated pots and 5 decorated with burnished ripple designs similar to the pottery found in Lothagam North, Jarigole pillar site and Dongodien.

The lithic assemblage included a small collection (n=68) made from various materials such as chalcedony, basalt, red jasper, quartz, obsidian, and chert, all of which were also found at the surface of the site with the exception of obsidian stone tools, which were mainly curated into bladelets, debris and prismatic cores.

== Interpretations ==
Compared to other pillar sites in the Lake Turkana basin, the site structure of Manemanya appears difficult to interpret due to the displacement of pillars which makes it impossible to fully comprehend the original configuration of the site. The distribution and chronology of the pillar sites and comparison of material culture also suggest that each locality in the western shores of Lake Turkana had two spatially proximate contemporaneous pillar sites that might have either served distinct social functions or been used by different groups at the same time. The chronological relations between Lothagam North, Lothagam West, Manemanya suggests that the sites were in use within a period of 43 years (4868-4825 cal BP), which is also the same period that Jarigole was possibly in use. The contemporaneity of these sites supports the idea of a basin-wide monumental tradition.

The ceramics from the site is comparable in form, paste type and decoration with Nderit pottery found at Lothagam North, Jarigole and Dongodien. The placement of human remains, pottery and beads within the platforms of these sites suggest that they were mainly used for mortuary purpose, mainly as other sites such as the Kalokol Pillar Site might have been possibly used for ceremonial purposes. The careful curation of obsidian tools is also similar to other pillar sites such as Lothagam North and Jarigole suggesting a shared tradition of sourcing, making and exchanging obsidian through extensive trade networks around the Lake, possible through the use of boats.

The presence of a single female burial gifted with myriad strands of beads opens an interesting window for understanding the material wealth and impressive skills used to fashion ornaments which were mainly curated from calcite. This also suggest that the individual was of a high status which she perhaps earned through her lifetime. The density of beads found suggests that they were contained with the body within a wrap or a shroud.

in essence, being part of the basin wide monumental tradition, Manemanya is viewed as evidence of social complexity and collective commemoration of shared beliefs following the advent of pastoralism in Turkana Basin. This is particularly significant period following the African Humid Period (AHP), and was a time marked by rapid environmental, social, and economic changes. Consequently, these pillar sites are seen by some scholars as a means by which herders mitigated risks by establishing robust social networks.
