= Lothagam Lokam =

Archaeological site in Kenya

Lothagam Lokam is an archaeological site at Lothagam near the southwestern shore of Lake Turkana in Turkana County near the Kerio River in northwestern Kenya. The site was occupied between approximately 9000 and 6000 years ago, when Lake Turkana was much bigger than it is today. During occupation the site would have been located on a peninsula jutting out into the lake. Lothagam Lokam was one of a number of fishing settlements in the Lake Turkana basin where Nile perch, catfish, turtles, crocodiles, and other aquatic species were hunted.

The site’s archaeological importance was realised by Mr Phillip Angella Immuron who worked as a schoolteacher in the nearby city of Lodwar. He had heard from local elders that Lothagam was a place where ancient bones could be found. The first archaeological excavations at the site were led by archaeologist L.H. Robbins in 1965-1966 which uncovered bone points (harpoons), stone artefacts (lithics), animal (fauna) and human skeletal remains. Excavations resumed in 2017 aiming to explore questions of fisher-hunter-gatherer resilience in eastern Africa during the Holocene.

Archaeological deposits at Lothagam Lokam document human activity during the African Humid Period and later Holocene climatic changes.

== African Humid Period ==
The African Humid Period was a time (14,600-5,000 years ago) characterised by a green Sahara, strengthened monsoons, and increased greenhouse gasses. The impact of these changes on human lifeways has been of great scientific interest. Through archaeological investigation, sites such as Lowasera and Nataruk have contributed greatly to our understanding of what life was like at this time.

=== Nataruk ===
Nataruk, another archaeological site dating to the AHP in Turkana County, Kenya, is a site in which the remains of 27 people were uncovered. The remains had marks on them, interpreted by archaeologist Dr. Mirazón Lahr to be signs of violence. Although, this interpretation of the site has been contested. If her interpretation is correct the Nataruk site suggests that inter-group conflict may have been a part of life for ancient hunter-gatherers.

== Etymology ==
Lothagam Lokam is a site with many names: Lothagam Lokam, Lothagam Harpoon site, and GeJi11.

The name Lothagam Lokam refers: 1) to the basaltic ridge called Lothagam and 2) to the subsection of it with white sands, "lokam" in the local language.

Its other name, Lothagam Harpoon site is in reference to the characteristic bone harpoons scattered across the site. There are a number of other sites in and around Lothagam also named after their characteristic features (e.g. Lothagam North Pillar Site).

In Kenya, archaeological sites are named using a 4-letter coordinate system. The site Lothagam Lokam lies on the intersection of "e" and "i" within the larger intersection of "G" and "J". The "11" refers to it being the 11th site identified within "GeJi".

== Location ==
Lothagam Lokam is a fisher-hunter-gatherer site at Lothagam near the southwestern shore of Lake Turkana in Turkana county near the Kerio river. It lies 64 kilometres (40 miles) from the city of Lodwar.

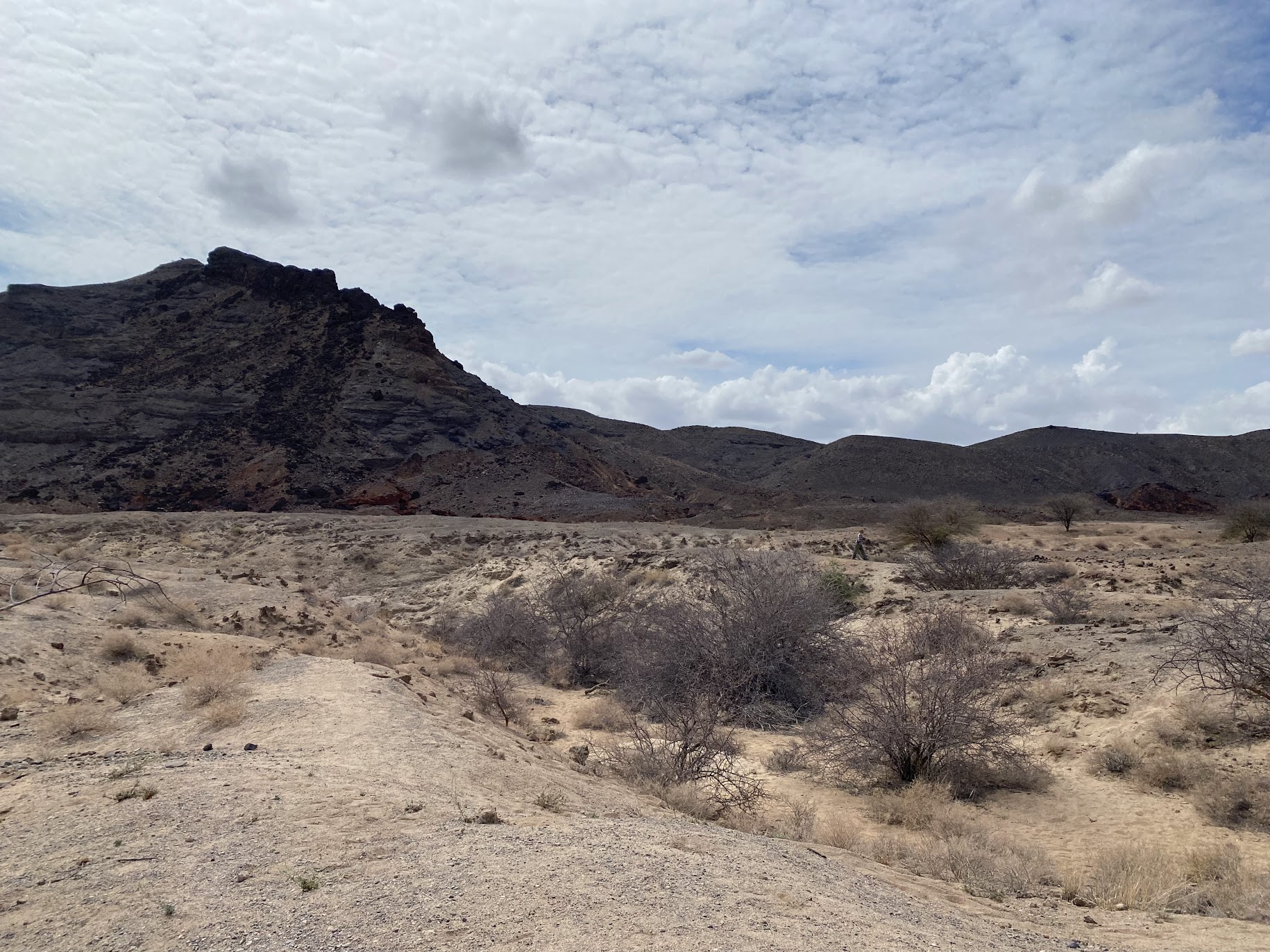
Lothagam Lokam archaeological site, facing east

Today, the site is dry and sandy with basaltic ridges on either side of the site. However, during the early Holocene (11,000 - 8,000 years ago), Lake Turkana was much larger and Lothagam's two basalt ridges would have formed a peninsula jutting out into the lake, forming a narrow beach. At the northern end of the site there was a sheltered cove and sometimes a swamp at the southern end of the site. Over thousands of years, Lake Turkana grew and shrank, causing the shoreline to move.

== Excavations and site interpretation ==
Despite the insight provided by Lowasera, Koobi Fora, and Nataruk, Lothagam Lokam has added a great deal to our understanding of human lifeways and palaeoecology during the AHP.

=== Excavations by Lawrence Robbins (1960s and 70s) ===
The 1965-1966 excavations at Lothagam Lokam produced large ceramic and lithic collections and one of the largest assemblages of Early Holocene human remains from East Africa.

=== Excavations by Steven Goldstein (2017) ===
The goal of the 2017 excavations were to figure out the chronology and palaeoecology of the site as well as to salvage human remains at risk of destruction via erosion. During these excavations, the archaeologists found stone tools made from basalt, chert, agate, and quartz, as well as some made from obsidian that was brought to the site from further away. They also found the remains of both land and lake animals. Pottery in the excavation units was undecorated, but on the surface there were some sherds decorated with designs associated with the Saharan African Humid Period. Also on the surface were many bone harpoons. This has been interpreted by the archaeologists to mean that increasingly dry conditions paired with rapidly dropping lake levels posed a challenge to the fisher-hunter-gatherers that used the site, but that they had a certain degree of resilience to these conditions because of exposure to previous, less dramatic, fluctuation in climate. The work at Lothagam Lokam is ongoing and hopes to further explore the strategic flexibility of the site's inhabitants.
