= Allia Bay =

Paleontological site in Kenya

The Allia Bay is a region on the east side of Lake Turkana in Kenya. The site is known for yielding its first hominid fossils in 1982, with further findings to this day, all of which have been identified as part of Australopithecus anamensis but possibly related to Australopithecus afarensis. Notable people with findings at Allia Bay include: Richard Leakey, Meave Leakey, Craig Feibel, Ian McDougall, Alan Walker.

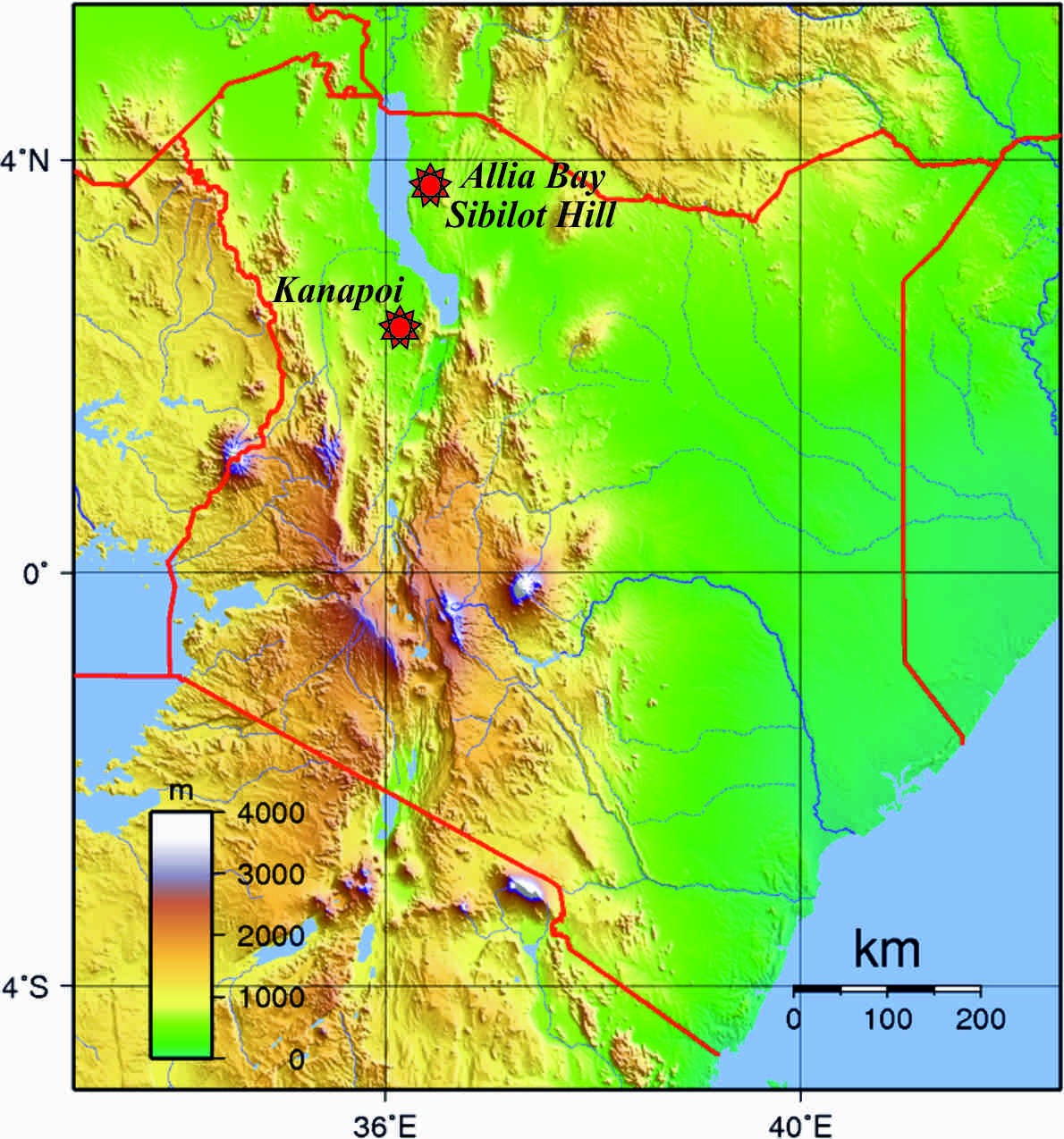

== Geography ==
The geographic coordinates of Allia Bay are 3°35′4″N, 36°16′4″E. As a set of isolate exposures it forms the southernmost region of Koobi Fora. One of its distinct features is the c.4.2 Ma "bone bed", which was likely a channel of the ancestral Omo River.

== Findings ==
All of the specimens were found to be 3.9 to 4.4 million years old and were dated using 3 main methods: argon-argon dating, potassium-argon dating, and magnetostratigraphy. Leakey, Feibel, McDougall, and Walker were involved in the discovery of 12 new specimens, presumed to be a new species within the genus Australopithecus. The new species was thought to be a possible ancestor of Australopithecus afarensis and a sister species of Ardipithecus ramidus. The 12 specimens found at Allia Bay were in conjunction with an additional nine that were found at Kanapoi in Kenya; these two sites' findings are the basis of a new, singular species within Australopithecus, for which the first Kanapoi specimen is the holotype, and the later Kanapoi and Allia Bay findings are paratypes. The Allia Bay specimens, listed in the table below, were found in or under the Moiti Tuff and have a mean age of 3.89 million years

| Specimen Number | Date | Site | Body Part | Discoverer |
| KMN-ER 7727 | 1982 | Allia Bay 261-1 | Left M^{2} | J. Kithumbi |
| KMN-ER 20419 | 1988 | Allia Bay 251 | Left radius | M. Kyeva |
| KMN-ER 20420 | 1988 | Allia Bay 261-1 | Left M^{2} | J. Kimengich |
| KMN-ER 20421 | 1988 | Allia Bay 261-1 | Right M^{3} | Sieving team |
| KMN-ER 20422 | 1988 | Allia Bay 261-1 | Left M_{1} | Sieving team |
| KMN-ER 20423 | 1988 | Allia Bay 261-1 | Left M_{2} | Sieving team |
| KMN-ER 20427 | 1988 | Allia Bay 261-1 | Left M^{1} | Sieving team |
| KMN-ER 20428 | 1988 | Allia Bay 261-1 | Left M_{3} | Sieving team |
| KMN-ER 20432 | 1988 | Allia Bay 261-1 | Left mandible fragment with canine root and P_{3-4} | Sieving team |
| KMN-ER 22683 | 1988 | Allia Bay 261-1 | Left P_{4} | Sieving team |
| KMN-ER 24148 | 1988 | Allia Bay 261-1 | Left dm^{2} | Sieving team |
| KMN-ER 30203 | 1995 | Allia Bay 261-1 | Right I^{1} | A. Walker |
| KMN-ER 30200 | 1995 | Allia Bay 261 | Left maxilla with M^{1 3} | K. Kimeu |

The method by which these specimens were named is concurrent with those found at Kanapoi: KNM-ER stands for Kenya National Museum - East Rudolf, where Rudolf is the lesser known, alternative name for Lake Turkana.
