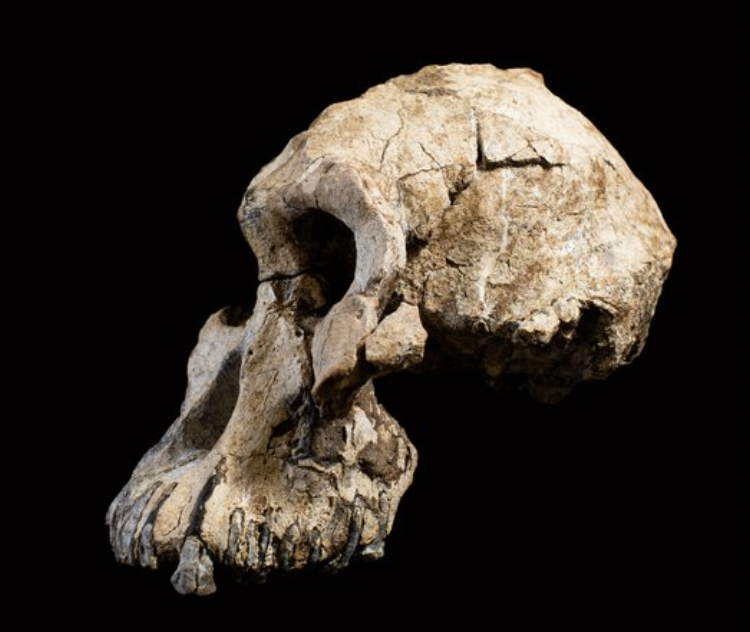
- MRD-VP-1/1 at Cleveland Museum of Natural History

Scientific classification
- Kingdom: Animalia
- Phylum: Chordata
- Class: Mammalia
- Order: Primates
- Superfamily: Hominoidea
- Family: Hominidae
- Genus: †Australopithecus
- Species: †A. anamensis

Binomial name
- †Australopithecus anamensis M.G. Leakey et al., 1995

Synonyms
- †Praeanthropus anamensis

= Australopithecus anamensis =

Australopithecus anamensis Temporal range: Pliocene

Extinct hominin from Pliocene East Africa

Australopithecus anamensis is a hominin species that lived roughly between 4.3 and 3.8 million years ago, and is the oldest known Australopithecus species.

Nearly 100 fossil specimens of A. anamensis are known from Kenya and Ethiopia, representing over 20 individuals. The first fossils of A. anamensis discovered are dated to around 3.8 and 4.2 million years ago and were found in Kanapoi and Allia Bay in northern Kenya.

A. afarensis is normally accepted to have emerged within this lineage. However, A. anamensis and A. afarensis appear to have lived side-by-side for at least some period of time, and whether the lineage that led to extant humans emerged in A. afarensis, or directly in A. anamensis is not fully settled. Fossil evidence determines that Australopithecus anamensis is the earliest hominin species in the Turkana Basin, but likely co-existed with afarensis towards the end of its existence. A. anamensis and A. afarensis may be treated as a single grouping.

Preliminary analysis of the sole upper cranial fossil indicates A. anamensis had a smaller cranial capacity (estimated 365–370 cm^{3}) than A. afarensis.

Hominin timeline
← / Earlier apes; ← / Gorilla split; ← / Chimpanzee split; ← / Earliest bipedal; ← / Earliest sign of Ardipithecus; ← / Earliest sign of Australopithecus; ← / Earliest stone tools; ← / Earliest sign of Homo; ← / Dispersal beyond Africa; ← / Earliest fire / cooking; ← / Earliest rock art; ← / Earliest clothes; ← / Modern humans
(million years ago)

== Discovery ==
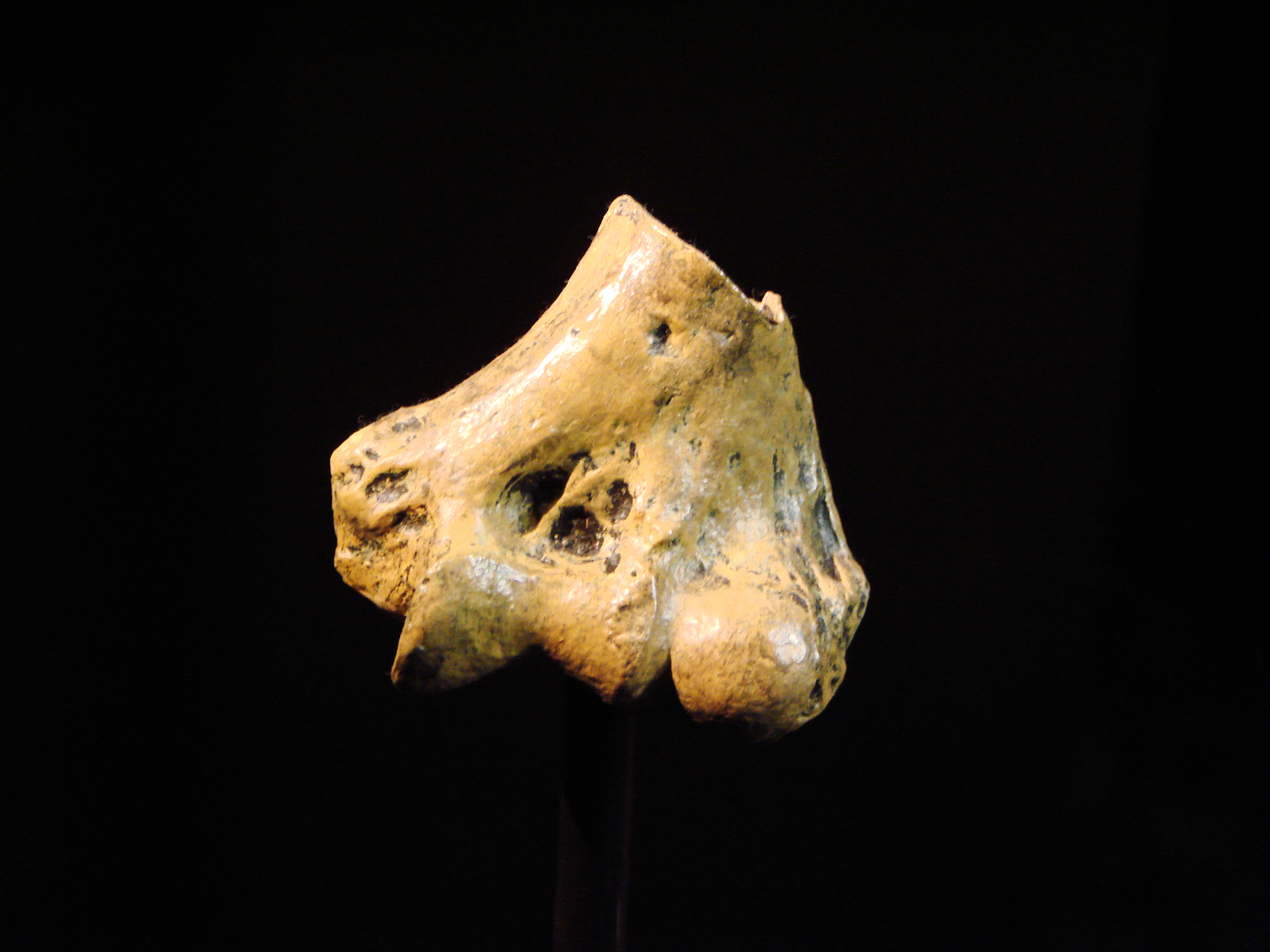
A. anamensis bone at the University of Zürich

The first fossilized specimen of the species, although not recognized as such at the time, was a single fragment of humerus (arm bone) found in Pliocene strata in the Kanapoi region of West Lake Turkana by a Harvard University research team in 1965. Bryan Patterson and William W. Howells's initial paper on the bone was published in Science in 1967; their initial analysis suggested an Australopithecus specimen and an age of 2.5 million years. Patterson and colleagues subsequently revised their estimation of the specimen's age to 4.0–4.5 mya based on faunal correlation data.

In 1994, London-born Kenyan paleoanthropologist Meave Leakey and archaeologist Alan Walker excavated the Allia Bay site and uncovered several additional fragments of the hominid, including one complete lower jaw bone which closely resembles that of a common chimpanzee (Pan troglodytes), but whose teeth bear a greater resemblance to those of a human. Based on the limited postcranial evidence available, A. anamensis appears to have been habitually bipedal, although it retained some primitive features of its upper limbs.

In 1995, Meave Leakey and her associates, taking note of differences between Australopithecus afarensis and the new finds, assigned them to a new species, A. anamensis, deriving its name from the Turkana word anam, meaning "lake". Although the excavation team did not find hips, feet or legs, Meave Leakey believes that Australopithecus anamensis often climbed trees. Tree climbing was one behavior retained by early hominins until the appearance of the first Homo species about 2.5 million years ago. A. anamensis shares many traits with A. afarensis and may well be its direct predecessor. Fossil records for A. anamensis have been dated to between 4.2 and 3.9 million years ago, with findings in the 2000s from stratigraphic sequences dating to about 4.1–4.2 million years ago. Specimens have been found between two layers of volcanic ash, dated to 4.17 and 4.12 million years, coincidentally when A. afarensis appears in the fossil record.

The fossils (21 in total) include upper and lower jaws, cranial fragments, and the upper and lower parts of a leg bone (tibia). In addition to this, the aforementioned fragment of humerus found in 1965 at the same site at Kanapoi has now been assigned to this species.

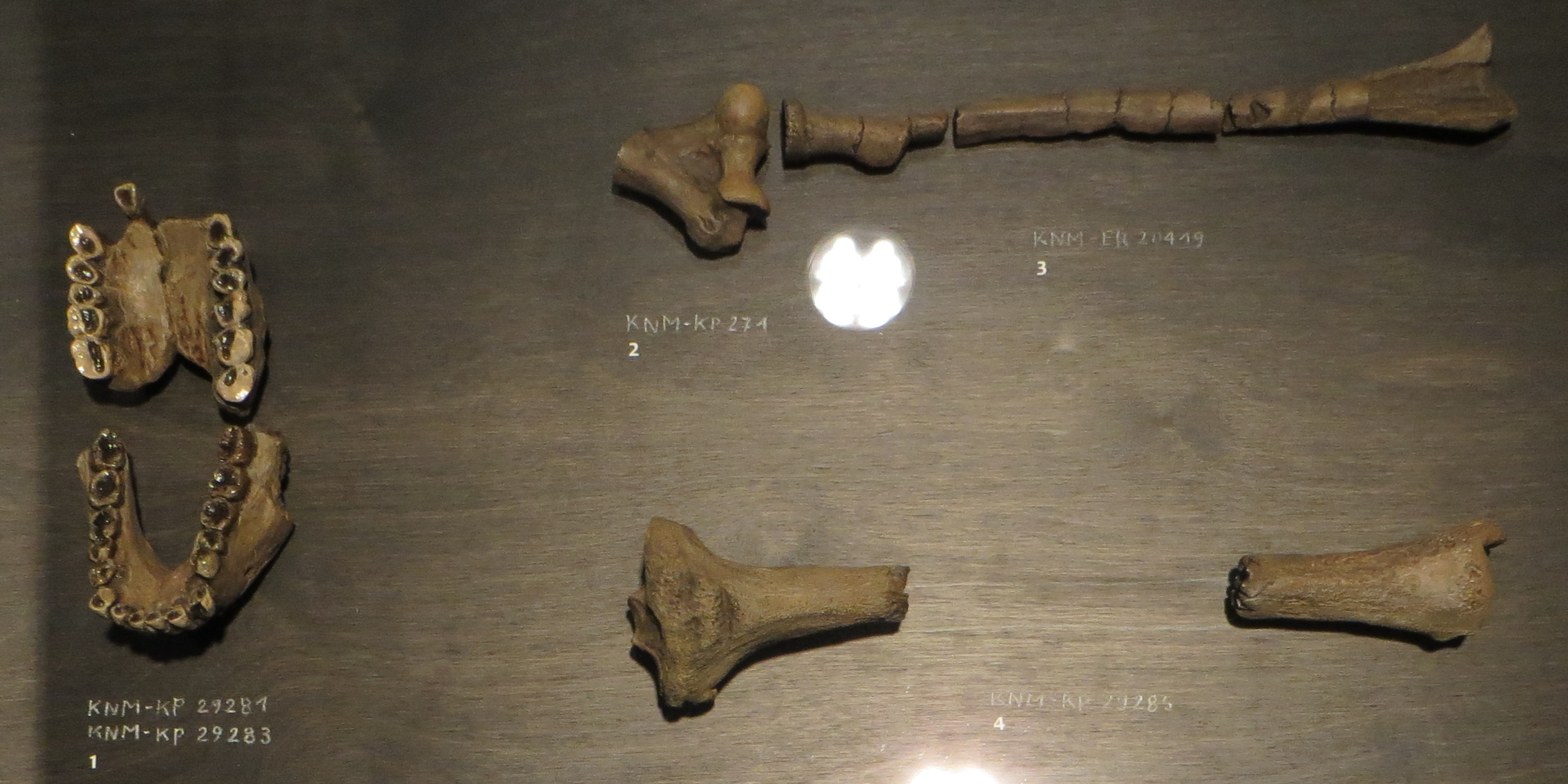
A. anamensis jaws and limbs

In 2006, a new A. anamensis find was officially announced, extending the range of A. anamensis into northeast Ethiopia. Specifically, one site known as Asa Issie provided 30 A. anamensis fossils. These new fossils, sampled from a woodland context, include the largest hominid canine tooth yet recovered and the earliest Australopithecus femur. The find was in an area known as Middle Awash, home to several other more modern Australopithecus finds and only six miles (9.7 kilometers) away from the discovery site of Ardipithecus ramidus, the most modern species of Ardipithecus yet discovered. Ardipithecus was a more primitive hominid, considered the next known step below Australopithecus on the evolutionary tree. The A. anamensis find is dated to about 4.2 million years ago, the Ar. ramidus find to 4.4 million years ago, placing only 200,000 years between the two species and filling in yet another blank in the pre-Australopithecus hominid evolutionary timeline.

In 2010, journal articles were published by Yohannes Haile-Selassie and others describing the discovery of around 90 fossil specimens in the time period 3.6 to 3.8 million years ago (mya), in the Afar area of Ethiopia, filling in the time gap between A. anamensis and Australopithecus afarensis and showing a number of features of both. This supported the idea (proposed for instance by Kimbel et al. in 2006) that A. anamensis and A. afarensis were in fact one evolving species (i.e. a chronospecies resulting from anagenesis), but in August 2019, scientists from the same Haile-Selassie team announced the discovery of a nearly intact skull for the first time, and dated to 3.8 mya, of A. anamensis in Ethiopia. This discovery also indicated that an earlier forehead bone fossil from 3.9 mya was A. afarensis and therefore the two species over-lapped and could not be a chronospecies (noting that this does not prevent A. afarensis being descended from A. anamensis, but would be descended from only part of the A. anamensis population). The skull itself was found by Afar herder Ali Bereino in 2016. Other scientists (e.g. Alemseged, Kimbel, Ward, White) cautioned that one forehead bone fossil, which they viewed as not conclusively A. afarensis, should not be taken as disproving the possibility of anagenesis yet.

In August 2019, scientists announced the discovery of MRD-VP-1/1, a nearly intact skull, for the first time, and dated to 3.8 million years ago, of A. anamensis in Ethiopia. The skull itself was found by Afar herder Ali Bereino in 2016. This skull is important in supplementing the evolutionary lineage of hominins. The skull has a unique combination of derived and ancestral characteristics. The cranium was determined to be older than A. afarensis through analyzing that the cranial capacity is much smaller and the face is very prognathic, both of which indicate that it is earlier than A. afarensis. Known as the MRD cranium, it is that of a male who was at an "advanced developmental age" determined by the worn-down post-canine teeth. The canine show mesiodistal elongation, which differs from A. afarensis. Similar to other australopiths, however, it has a narrow upper face with no forehead and a large midface with broad zygomatic bones. Before this new discovery, A anamensis and A afarensis were widely thought to have evolved one right after the other in a single lineage. The discovery of MRD, though, suggests that A. afarensis did not result from anagenesis, but that the two hominin species lived side-by-side for at least 100,000 years.

== Environment ==
Australopithecus anamensis was found in Kenya, specifically at Allia Bay, East Turkana. Through analysis of stable isotope data, their environment is believed to have been more closed woodland canopies surrounding Lake Turkana than are present today. The greatest density of woodlands at Allia Bay was along the ancestral Omo River. More open savanna was thought to exist in the basin margins or uplands. Similarly at Allia Bay, the environment was suggested as much wetter. While not definitive, nut or seed-bearing trees could have been present at Allia Bay, but more research is needed.

== Diet ==
Studies of the occlusal dental microwear on A. anamensis molar fossils show a pattern of long striations. This pattern is similar to the microwear on the molars of gorillas, suggesting that A. anamensis had a similar diet to that of the modern gorilla. The microwear patterns are consistent on all A. anamensis molar fossils regardless of location or time. This shows that their diet largely remained the same no matter what their environment. The signal derived from A. anamensis buccal microwear is consistent with feeding on hard and brittle foodstuffs.

The earliest dietary isotope evidence in Turkana Basin hominin species comes from the A. anamensis. This evidence suggests that their diet consisted primarily of C3 resources, possibly with a small amount of C4-derived resources. Within the next 1.99- to 1.67-million-year period, at least two distinctive hominin taxa shifted to a higher level of C4-resource consumption. At this point, no cause for this shift in diet is known. This research does not by itself indicate a plant-based diet, because the isotopes can be ingested by eating animals and insects that fed on C3 and C4 resources.

A. anamensis hominins had thick, long, and narrow jaws with their side teeth arranged in parallel lines. The thicker tooth enamel of A. anamensis suggests that it consumed harder foods than the earlier Ar. ramidus, which may have been an omnivore similar to chimpanzees.

== Relation to other hominin species ==
Australopithecus anamensis is the intermediate species between Ardipithecus ramidus and Australopithecus afarensis, and has several shared traits with humans and other apes. Fossil studies of the wrist morphology of A. anamensis have suggested knuckle-walking, which is a derived trait shared with other African apes. The A. anamensis hand portrays robust phalanges and metacarpals, and long middle phalanges. These characteristics show that the A. anamensis likely engaged in arboreal living, but were largely bipedal, although not in an identical way to Homo.

All Australopithecus species were bipedal and small-brained, and had large teeth. A. anamensis is often confused with Australopithecus afarensis due to their similar bone structure and their habitation of woodland areas. These similarities include thick tooth enamel, which is a shared derived trait of all Australopithecus species, and shared with most Miocene hominoids. Tooth size variability in A. anamensis suggests that significant body size variation existed. In relation to their diet, A. anamensis species has similarities with their predecessor Ardipithecus ramidus. A. anamensis sometimes had much larger canines than later Australopithecus species. A. anamensis and A. afarensis have similarities in their humeri and the tibiae. They both have human-like features and matching sizes. The bodies of A. anamensis were found to be somewhat larger than those of A. afarensis. Based on additional A. afarensis collections from the Hadar, Ethiopia, site, the A. anamensis radius is similar to that of A. afarensis in the lunate and scaphoid surfaces. Additional findings suggest that A. anamensis had long arms compared to modern humans.

== Physical characteristics ==
Based on fossil evidence, A. anamensis expresses high degrees of sexual dimorphism. Although considered to be the more primitive of the australopiths, A. anamensis had parts of the knee, tibia, and elbow that were different from apes, which indicates bipedalism as the species' form of locomotion. Specifically, the tibia bone of A. anamensis has a more expansive upper end with bone.

In addition to the modified body parts that indicate bipedalism, A. anamensis fossils show evidence of tree climbing. Archeological finds indicate that A. anamensis had long forearms, as well as modified features of the wrist bone. Both the forearms and finger bones of A. anamensis indicate a potential of using the upper limbs as support when operating in trees or on the ground. Forearm bones belonging to A. anamensis have been found to be 265 to 277 mm in length. The curved proximal hand phalanx of A. anamensis in the fossil record that contains strong ridges is indicative of its potential ability to climb.

Fossil evidence reveals that A. anamensis had a somewhat wide jaw joint that was flat from front to back, which resembles a curvature similar to those seen in great apes. Furthermore, the ear canals of A. anamensis fossils are narrow in diameter. The ear canal most resembles that of chimpanzees and is contrasting to the wide ear canals of both later Australopithecus and Homo.

The first lower premolar of A. anamensis is characterized by a singular large cusp. Additionally, A. anamensis has a narrow first milk molar that contains a large dominant cusp with minimum surface area, which may have been used for crushing.

== Life history ==
A. anamensis had a significantly faster life history than modern humans, with analysis of its dental eruption and crown calcification rates showing its rate of growth was substantially more rapid than that of modern human juveniles.

== See also ==
- List of human evolution fossils
- Paranthropus boisei
