= Kanapoi =

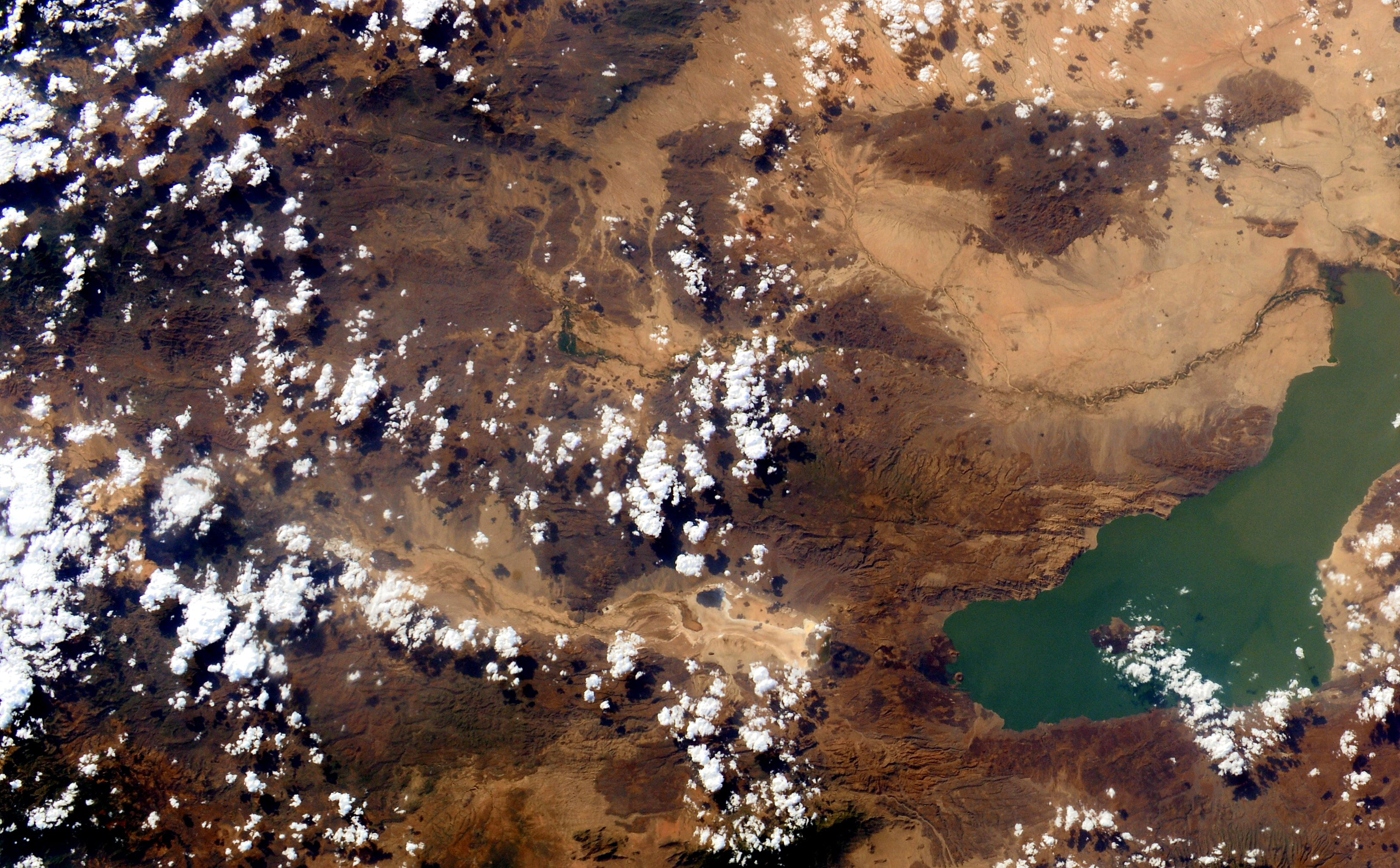
Kanapoi seen from outer space.

Kanapoi is a paleontological site in the Kenyan Rift Valley, to the southwest of Lake Turkana. Fossils were first found at Kanapoi in the 1960s by a Harvard expedition, and later by expeditions from the National Museums of Kenya.

Fossils at Kanapoi were deposited in sediments formed by lake margins, rivers and deltas between 3.4 - 4.2 Million years ago (Ma). Kanapoi fossils include a diverse array of fish, turtles, crocodiles, primates including likely human ancestors, elephants, giraffes, rhinoceroses, rodents, horses, hippos, pigs and a variety of herbivores and carnivores.

The hominin Australopithecus anamensis appears in Kanapoi between 3.9 and 4.2 Ma, one of a number of fossil specimens demonstrating that human ancestors were already bipedal by this time. Kanapoi also is the site of archaeological discoveries.

== History of investigation ==
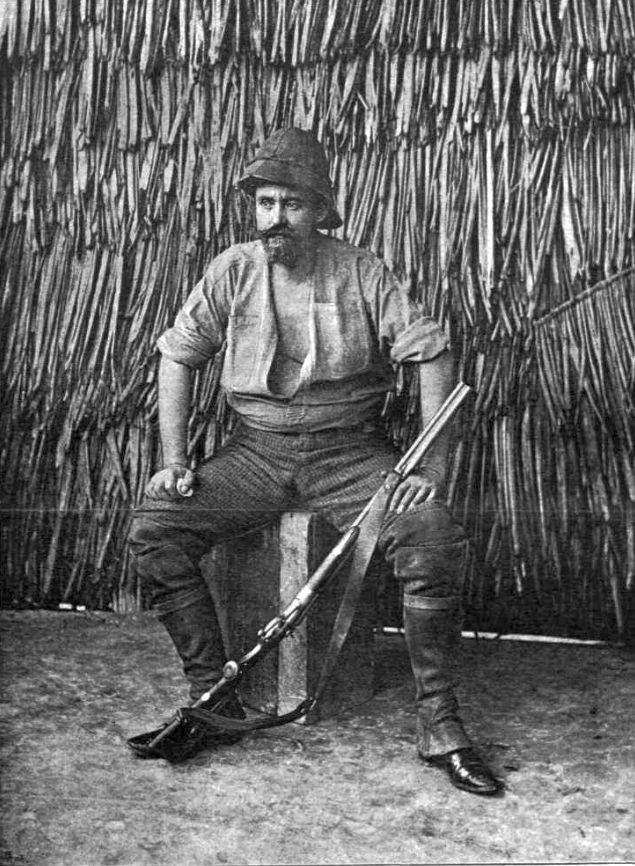
Count Sámuel Teleki was one of the first Europeans to see Kanapoi.

Count Sámuel Teleki von Szék and Ludwig von Höhnel were the first European explorers to reach Lake Turkana, in 1888. They named it Lake Rudolf after the Prince of Austro-Hungary. An expedition by French naturalist Bourg de Bozas revealed a rich assemblage of vertebrate fossils around the lake in 1902-3, eventually inspiring Arambourg's Mission Scientifique de l'Omo in the 1930s and 1940s. Louis Leakey and what would become the National Museums of Kenya explored the fossil deposits in the 1940s, until political and military turmoil stymied work in the aftermath of World War II.

Following L.H. Robbins' investigations around the southern margins of Lake Turkana and the Turkana Basin, Harvard's Bryan Patterson launched a number of expeditions to fossil sites around the Turkwel River, Kerio River, Kanapoi and then Lothagam. These expeditions were followed by another series launched by the International Omo Research Expedition (IORE) from 1967–76, led by Kenyan, French and American researchers. Efforts continued in the 1980s under the direction of the National Museums of Kenya and Richard Leakey.

More recent work in Kanapoi has been led by Meave Leakey and a number of Kenyan and international researchers.

== Geological setting ==
Geological investigation of Kanapoi and the sedimentary sequences found there define the Kanapoi formation, a series of sedimentary deposits formed during three primary phases in the early Pliocene. The Kanapoi formation overlays Miocene-Pliocene basalt topography with substantial relief. Many of these underlying older deposits appear on the surface today through weathering or excavation of younger material.

The earliest and lowest sedimentary deposits are fluvial, formed by the layering of clays, sandstones, pebbles and cobbles washed downstream by flowing rivers. The deposits are marked by mollusks, ostracods and carbonized plant parts, and demonstrate alternating passage of river channels or meandering streams. The lowest deposits are marked by a series of volcanic ash layers.

The middle sedimentary deposits are lacustrine, corresponding to the ancient Lonyuman lake interval found at other locations throughout the Turkana Basin. The deposits include many ostracods and mollusks, most notably the gastropod Bellamya. Sediments alternate between clay and siltstone, and coarsen upward into sands until the deposition of the Kanapoi volcanic tuff.

The upper sedimentary deposits grade from lake to river-dominated deposition, and include Etheria mussel reefs, sandstones, coarse gravels, occasional lake phases, and the formation of soils. A late formation of green claystones appears at approximately 3.5 Ma, suggesting that these sediments may have formed with the Lokochot lake found elsewhere in the Basin.

== See also ==
- Turkana Basin
- Lothagam
