= Kalokol Pillar Site =

Archeological site in Kenya

Nasura Pillar Site
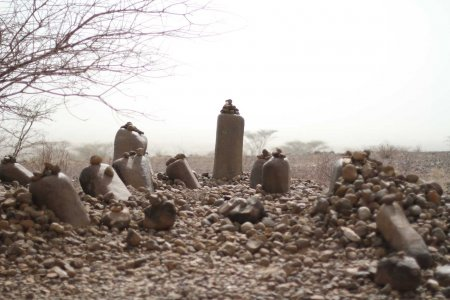
- Nasura Pillar Site in Turkana, Kenya

- Nasura Pillar Site in Nasura, Turkana, Kenya
- 3.422778°N 35.802778°E
- Location: Turkana County, Kenya
- Region: Rift Valley

The Nasura Pillar Site, registered as GcJh3 and also known as Namoratunga II, is an archaeological site on the west side of Lake Turkana in Kenya dating to the Pastoral Neolithic. Namoratunga means "people of stone" in the Turkana language. The site was originally believed to have been created around 300 BC, but recent excavations have yielded an older radiocarbon sample dating to 2398 +/- 44 years BC.

== Background ==
The site is located 50 Kilometres off the Lodwar – Kalokol highway, and it is easily visible on 30 metres (98 ft) from the road. The Kalokol Pillar Site contains 19 basalt pillars which are surrounded by a circular formation of stones. A number of other pillar sites surround Lake Turkana as well and date to the same time period; Lothagam North and Manemanya, for example, are communal cemeteries. These sites were likely built by the region's earliest herders. Another burial site with stone cairns, Namoratunga I, also known as Lokori, does not have stone pillars.

Archaeologists Mark Lynch and L.H. Robbins described the Kalokol Pillar Site in 1978 and identified it as a possible archaeoastronomical site. Lynch believed the basalt pillars tie the constellations or stars to the 12-month 354-day lunar calendar of Cushitic speakers of southern Ethiopia. The pillars were said to align with seven star systems: Triangulum, Pleiades, Bellatrix, Aldebaran, Central Orion, Saiph, and Sirius. Other archaeologists have reanalyzed the archaeoastronomical evidence, and an older radiocarbon date from the Kalokol Pillar Site now calls into question these interpretations. The site was formally submitted to UNESCO's World Heritage Center as part of Tentative List Property on 30th of June 2023.

== See also ==
- Borana calendar
