= Pastoral Neolithic =

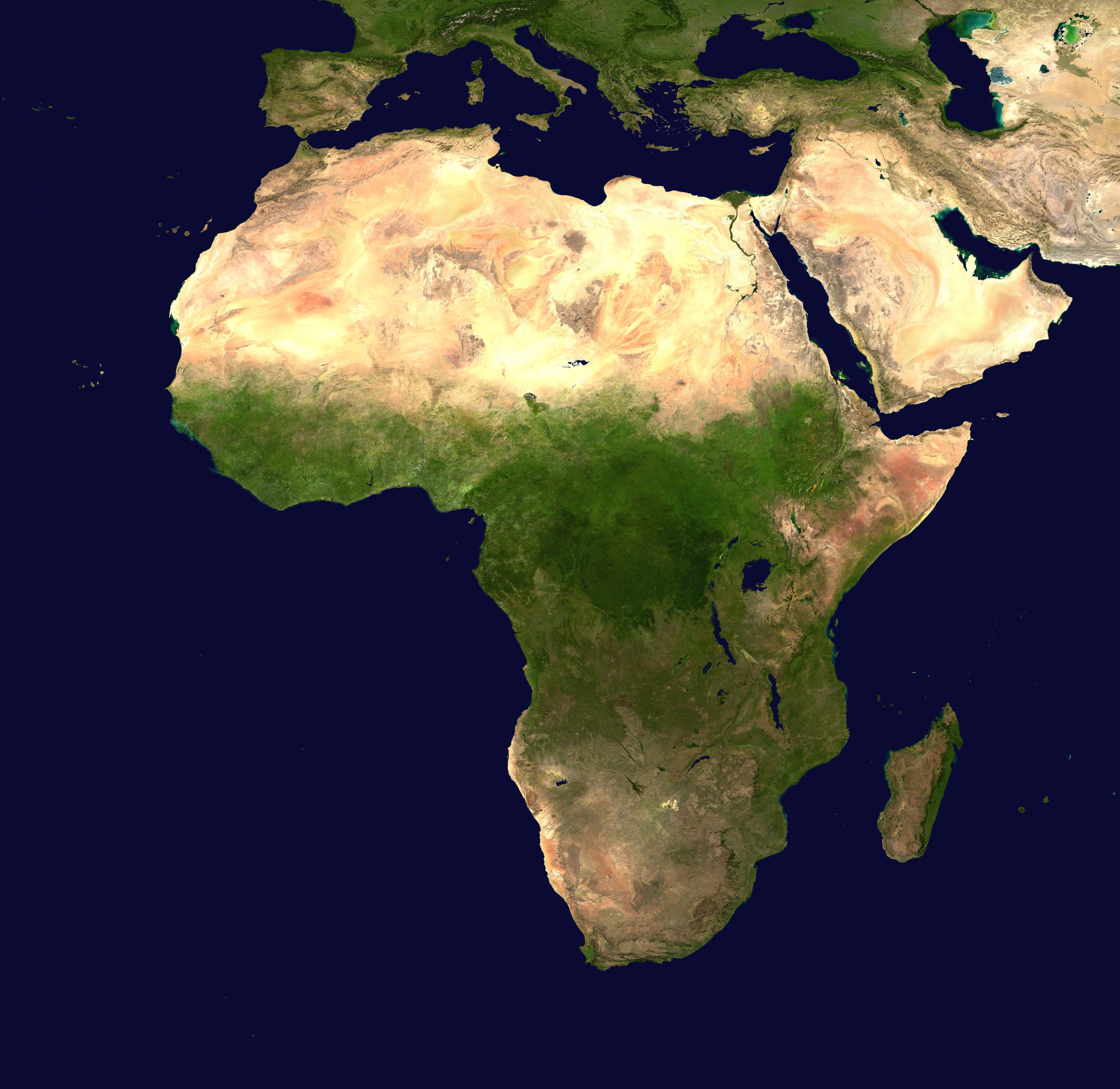
The Pastoral Neolithic of Africa

The Pastoral Neolithic (5000 BP - 1200 BP) refers to a period in Africa's prehistory, specifically Tanzania and Kenya, marking the beginning of food production, livestock domestication, and pottery use in the region following the Later Stone Age. The exact dates of this time period remain inexact, but early Pastoral Neolithic sites support the beginning of herding by 5000 BP. In contrast to the Neolithic in other parts of the world, which saw the development of farming societies, the first form of African food production was nomadic pastoralism, or ways of life centered on the herding and management of livestock. The shift from hunting to food production relied on livestock that had been domesticated outside of East Africa, especially North Africa. This period marks the emergence of the forms of pastoralism that are still present. The reliance on livestock herding marks the deviation from hunting-gathering but precedes major agricultural development. The exact movement tendencies of Neolithic pastoralists are not completely understood.

The term "Pastoral Neolithic" is used most often by archaeologists to describe early pastoralist periods in eastern Africa (also known as the "East African Neolithic"). In the Sahara, hunter-gatherers first adopted livestock (e.g., cattle, sheep, goats) in the eighth to seventh millennia BP. As the grasslands of the Green Sahara began drying out in the mid-Holocene, herders then spread into the Nile Valley and eastern Africa.

During the Pastoral Neolithic in eastern Africa (5000 BP - 1200 BP), archaeologists have identified two pastoralist groups who spread through southern Kenya and Northern Tanzania; they co-existed alongside Eburran phase 5 hunter-gatherers; these groups are known as the Savanna Pastoral Neolithic and the Elmenteitan. The Pastoral Neolithic in eastern Africa was followed by the Pastoral Iron Age approximately two thousand years ago, during which agriculture, iron technology, and Bantu speakers spread into the region.

The Pastoral Neolithic is associated with the construction of megalithic sites such as the Jarigole pillar site near Lake Turkana in Kenya.

== Origins ==
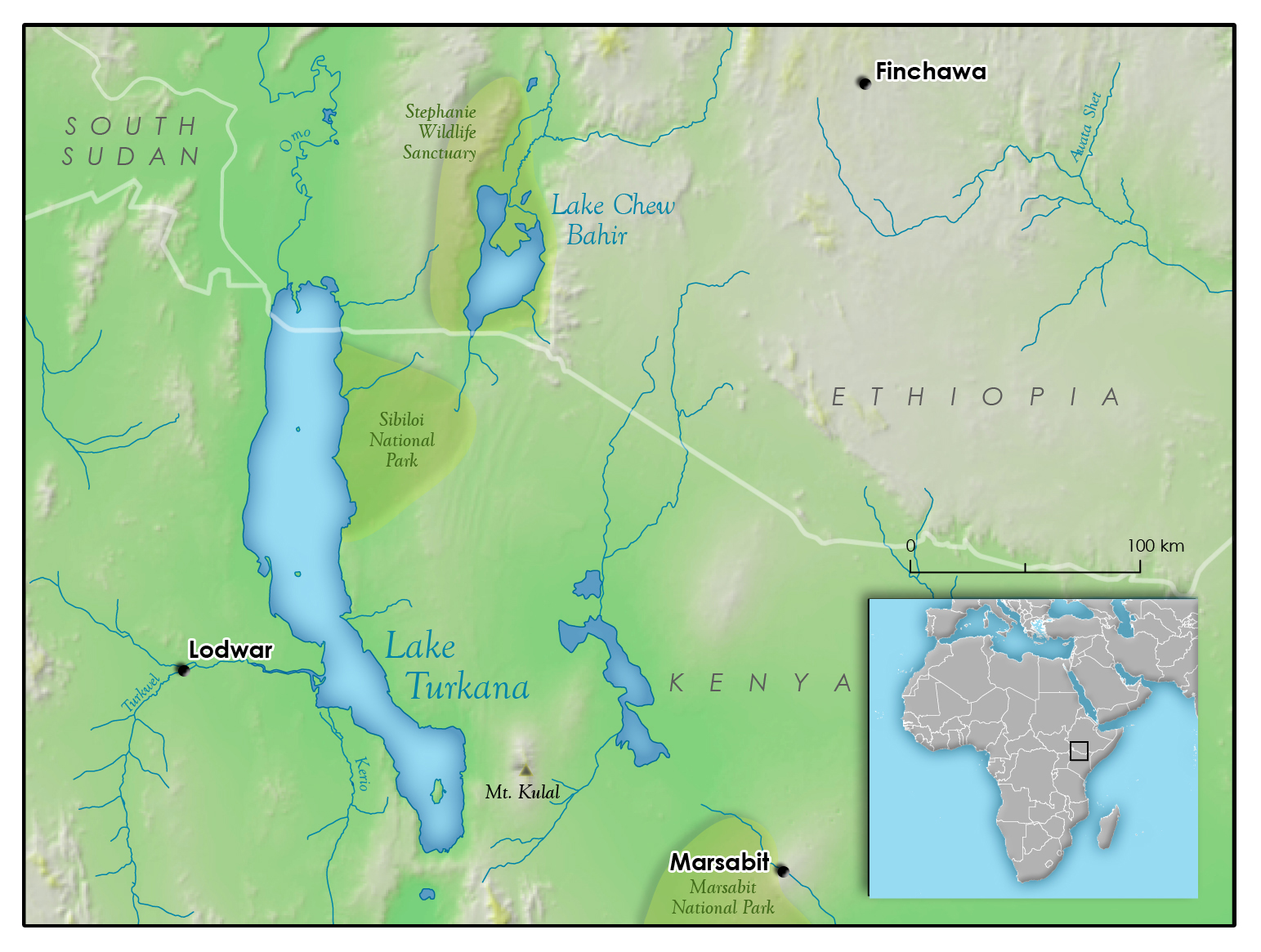
The Lake Turkana region

The beginning of the Pastoral Neolithic follows the Late Stone Age around 5000 BP. The earliest instances of food production in East Africa are found in Kenya and Tanzania. The earliest Pastoral Neolithic sites are in the Lake Turkana region from around 5000 BP. Predating the introduction of imported livestock, African pastoralists kept domestic livestock but did not keep the lifestyles characteristic of modern pastoralists; this is shown by the lack of bones from domesticated animals and an abundance of bones from undomesticated animals at early Pastoral Neolithic sites. These preliminary herding cultures are characteristic of the Pastoral Neolithic and generally lack stationary agricultural practices and metal use. The exact introductory timeline of pastoralism to eastern Africa is not completely known.

The faunal record shows that the livestock of Neolithic pastoralists were not domesticated in East Africa, but were introduced into East Africa; faunal remains of wild cattle, sheep, or goats are not found. The fossils of common domesticates are not found at excavated sites in East Africa (e.g., Lake Turkana Basin, Lake Nakuru Basin, Serengeti Plains, Lake Eyasi), suggesting they were not present during the transition into the Pastoral Neolithic. Limited cave painting evidence from Mt. Elgon, Kenya is consistent with the presence of northern African breeds of cattle during the Pastoral Neolithic. These domesticated animals can be estimated to have arrived in northern Africa around 8000 BP and to have reached Eastern Africa by 5000 BP. The import of different breeds of cattle occurred on multiple different occasions throughout the Pastoral Neolithic period.

Genetic evidence shows that lactase persistence developed in East African populations between 7000 BP and 3000 BP, which is consistent with existing evidence for the introduction of livestock. According to genomic data from 2019, the herders moved into Eastern African around 5,000 BP, and they carried both ancestry from the Near-East and Sudan.

== Migratory patterns ==
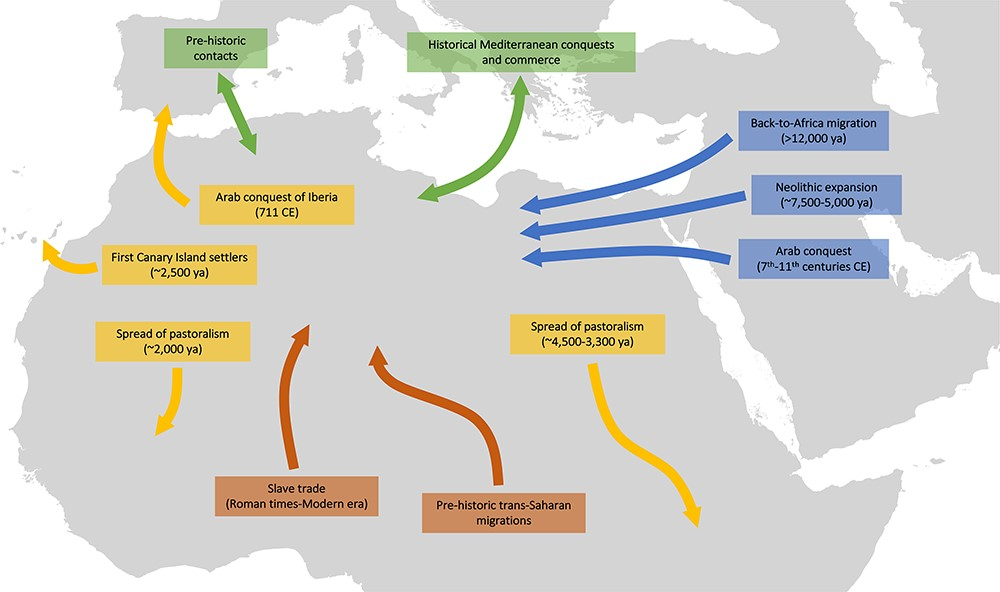
Movement of pastoralists into East Africa

The exact way in which pastoralism reached East Africa during the Pastoral Neolithic is not completely understood. The pottery and stone tools found near Lake Turkana supports that migrants from Ethiopia and Sudan traveled south in small bursts and introduced pastoralism.

A considerable amount of evidence supports the case of there being two major expansions (associated with the spread of Afro-Asiatic and Nilo-Saharan languages) in eastern Africa which transformed the food systems of the region.

A study by Prendergast et al. (2019) analysed genome-wide DNA data from 31 Pastoral Neolithic individuals from sites in Kenya and Tanzania. The study found that these early pastoralists harboured ancestry from three distinct ancient populations, related to: (1) modern groups from northern Africa and the Levant, (2) contemporary Nilotic speakers such as the Dinka or Nuer, and (3) hunter-gatherers from East Africa. The Pastoral Neolithic individuals were modelled as deriving ~40% of their ancestry from Chalcolithic Levantines (sampled by Harney et al. 2018), ~40% from a population related to present-day Dinka, and ~20% from East African hunter-gatherers, represented by an ancient forager from Mota in Ethiopia. There was no evidence for West African or Bantu-related ancestry in the Pastoral Neolithic individuals, this ancestry only appearing in later samples dating from the Iron Age. The study hypothesised that admixture between a Levantine-related population and a Nilotic-related population occurred around 6000-5000 BP in northeastern Africa, associated with the spread of pastoralism. This admixed population then migrated southwards, mixing further with East African foragers, before reaching the Turkana Basin around 5000 BP (3000 BC). Among modern populations, the Pastoral Neolithic samples were found to have greatest similarities to modern Cushitic speaking peoples, who harbour a similar mix of East African and West Eurasian ancestry.

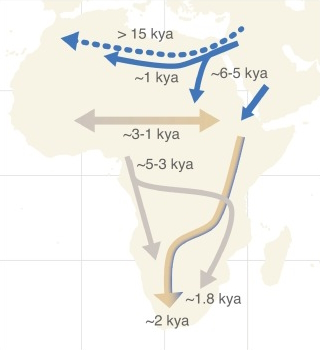
Migration routes in Africa related to the expansion of herders and crop farmers during the Holocene

A study by Skoglund et al. (2017) similarly found that a Pastoral Neolithic individual from Tanzania, dating from ~3,100 BP, derived ~38% of her ancestry from Neolithic farmers of the Levant. According to the authors, this result could be explained by "the migration into Africa by descendants of pre-pottery Levantine farmers."

A study by Wang et al. (2022) analyzed a sample from Kadruka in Upper Nubia, dated to roughly 4000 BP (c. 2000 BC), and found it to be genetically indistinguishable from those of the Pastoral Neolithic, harbouring a similar mix of approximately 40% Levantine-related and 60% East African-related ancestry. The Kadruka individual was from an agro-pastoral population linked with the Kerma culture of Upper Nubia. These findings are consistent with the Kadruka individual representing "a possible genetic source population for the earliest eastern African pastoralists who settled in the Rift Valley." The authors of the study suggest that the Pastoral Neolithic likely arose through a rapid migration from the Nile Valley, without significant admixture with the indigenous foragers of East Africa as was previously thought.

A study by Vicente et al. (2021) found that people related to the Pastoral Neolithic introduced pastoralism into southern Africa approximately 2000 years ago, and admixed with local hunter-gatherer groups to form the Khoekhoe populations in South Africa. These pastoralists carried approximately 69% East African and 31% Eurasian ancestry, and were likely Cushitic speakers. Lin et al. (2018) found that this pastoralist migration introduced the SLC24A5 Eurasian light-skin pigmentation gene into the Khoe-San population 2,000 years ago, which subsequently experienced a selective sweep within the Khoe-San. The most common SLC24A5 haplotype was found to be identical among European, eastern African, and Khoe-San individuals. All extant Khoe-San groups have admixture with a mixed group containing East African and Eurasian ancestry.

In Southern Africa it is also argued that plant cultivation took place considerably later than the domestication of cattle and other animals. This is also believed to have been true for other areas of the world such as India and Peru. Marshall et al (2002) take the tenth millennium BP as that of African cattle domestication. Plant domestication is placed by these researchers as being sometime after 4000 BP. Their point is that the advantage of yield is not, in the African context, a significant driver compared to the risks of aridity and the need to move so as to ensure feed for cattle. These are conclusions based on remains. In studies based on chemical analysis, on-going benefit from Neolithic herding activities is detected. It is speculated that the richer grasslands persist because they attract wild grazers as well as herded animals, thereby perpetuating the cycle.

== Cultural characteristics ==
Neolithic pastoralists employed various subsistence strategies (e.g., fishing, herding) and are generally associated with stone tools, ceramics, and burial traditions.

=== Pastoral practices ===
The shift from hunting-gathering to herding developed gradually, over thousands of years, during the Pastoral Neolithic. The Pastoral Neolithic of East Africa is one of a few in world history where herding significantly preceded agricultural food production.

The major transition from predominantly hunter-gatherer economies to predominantly herding economies may have occurred around 3000 BP. There are limited remains of domesticated animals at sites that predate 3000 BP. For example, at the Enkapune Ya Muto rock shelter site of central Kenya, among evidence of mostly wild fauna, there are few caprine (goat/sheep) teeth dated to around 4400 BP. The length of time between the initial introduction of domesticates and their full adoption is thought to have occurred between the cultural separation of immigrant populations and indigenous populations in the region. Additionally, paleoclimatic evidence from Lake Naivasha, Kenya suggests that rain patterns may not have been favorable for dairy pastoralism until around 3000 BP. After 3000 BP, the majority of fauna found at Pastoral Neolithic sites are from domesticated animals rather than undomesticated animals. By this time, many communities were exclusively stock-keeping and herding.

=== Stone tool use ===
Luxmanda
- Location of Luxmanda site
- 4°15′24″S 35°18′38″E
- Location: Tanzania

As compared to stone use associated with agriculture, archeological reports of stone use provide insight into the technological development and use during the Pastoral Neolithic.

The major 20th century archeological study of Stone Bowl cultures conducted by Louis Leakey and Mary Leakey uncovered a considerable amount of evidence about food systems during the Pastoral Neolithic.

The archeological site at Luxmanda, Tanzania is estimated to have been occupied initially around 3000 BP, thereby, establishing it as Africa's southernmost Pastoral Neolithic site to date. The size of stone tools found at Luxmanda establishes that Pastoral Neolithic establishments may not have been mobile. Stones were used for the purpose of grinding show high plant food processing as well as for the purpose of bone marrow pounding and grease extractions. These stone tools found at Luxmanda, Tanzania challenge established ideas about travel patterns and food systems during the Pastoral Neolithic.

Archeological evidence from the Lake Turkana region shows that Nderit and Ileret pottery emerged in the region between 4500 BP and 4200 BP. The introduction of these distinct decorated and shaped forms of pottery are associated with sheep and cattle domestication in the region.

=== Burial traditions ===
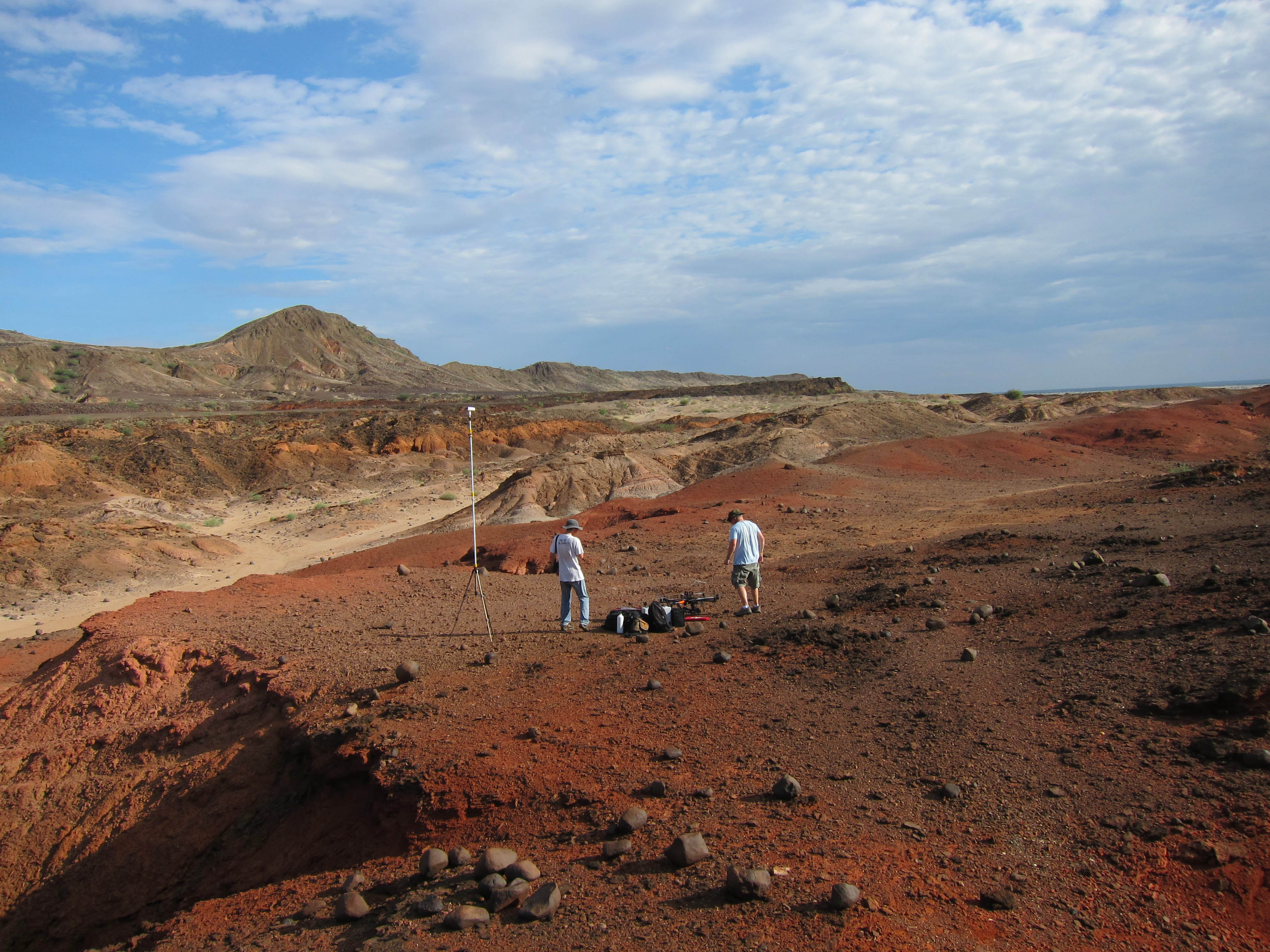
The Lothagam Site in Northern Kenya

Excavations of cemeteries and burial sites of communities during the Pastoral Neolithic provide insight into the traditions and social structures associated with the Pastoral Neolithic.

The Lothagam North Pillar Site is a communal cemetery in the Lake Turkana region where the earliest Pastoral Neolithic sites are found. The Lothagam North Pillar Site consists of a large cavity constructed with large rocks, estimated to hold at least 580 individuals. The demographics of those buried are diverse in age, sex, and predicted social class. This site is consistent with the narrative of communities in movement throughout the Pastoral Neolithic.

== The end of the Pastoral Neolithic ==
The introduction of metallurgy around 1200 BP marks the end of the Pastoral Neolithic. The iron-using pastoralists of the Early Iron Age consists populations that descend from Pastoral Neolithic populations, immigrating populations from Northern Africa, and populations from elsewhere. The Pastoral Neolithic period is followed by the Pastoral Iron Age which saw an influx of northern Nilotic peoples, and the later Iron Age migration of Bantu agriculturalists.

== See also ==
- Jarigole pillar site
- Kalokol Pillar Site
- Lothagam North Pillar Site
- Nderit pottery
