= Borana calendar =

Ancient calendar from Ethiopia and Kenya

The Borana calendar is a calendrical system used by the Borana Oromo, a people living in southern Ethiopia and northern Kenya. The calendar was reported to have been developed around 300 BC found at Namoratunga. However, reconsideration of the Namoratunga site led astronomer and archaeologist Clive Ruggles to question the relationship between the calendar and the Namaratunga megaliths. The Borana calendar consist of 29.5 days and 12 months for a total 354 days in a year. The calendar has no weeks but name for each day of the month. It is a lunar-stellar calendar system.

== Structure ==
A lunar-stellar calendar, the Borana Calendar relies on astronomical observations of the moon in conjunction with seven particular stars or constellations. Borana months (Stars/Lunar Phases) are Bittottessa (Triangulum), Camsa (Pleiades), Bufa (Aldebaran), Waxabajjii (Bellatrix), Obora Gudda (Central Orion-Saiph), Obora Dikka (Sirius), Birra (full moon), Cikawa (gibbous moon), Sadasaa (quarter moon), Abrasa (large crescent), Ammaji (medium crescent), and Gurrandala (small crescent).

There are 27 names of days of a month. Hence, first two or three days are used twice at the beginning and end of a month.

Names of days of a month
1. Bita Kara	10. Gidada	19. Adula Ballo
2. Bita Lama	11. Walla	20. Maganatti Jarra
3. Gardaduma	12. Ruda	21. Maganatti Britti
4. Sonsa	13. Basa Dura	22. Garba Dura
5. Sorsa	14. Basa Ballo	23. Garba Balla
6. Rurruma	15. Areri Dura	24. Salban Dura
7. Algajima	16. Areri Ballo	25. Salban Balla
8. Lumasa	17. Carra	26. Salban Dullacha
9. Arb	18. Adula Dura	27. Garda Dullacha

Months can be identified by moon phase in relation to seven stars or star groups. They star groups are Triangulum (called Lami by Borana), Pleiades (called Busan by Borana), Aldebaran (called Bakkalcha by Borana), Bellatrix (called Algajima by Borana), central Orion (called Arb Gaddu by Borana), Saiph (called Urji Walla by Borana), and Sirius (called Basa by Borana) star systems.

Month and star system
Month name	Star group	Borana name for star group
1. Bittottessa	Triangulum	Lami
2. Camsa	Pleiades	Busan
3. Bufa	Aldebaran	Bakkalcha
4. Wacabajjii	Belletrix	Algajima
5. Obora Gudda	Central Orion-Saiph	Arb Gaddu
6. Obora Dikka	Sirius	Basa
7. Birra	full moon	
8. Cikawa	gibbous moon	
9. Sadasaa	quarter moon	
10. Abrasa	large crescent	
11. Ammaji	medium crescent	
12. Gurrandala	small crescent	

The first day of the new year in Borana calendar starts in the month of "Bittootessa" and the day name "Bitta Kara". This is when Triangulum is in conjunction with the new moon. After that, the calendar simply counts the day names through the month based on that first astronomical observation – conjunction of the new moon at the beta Triangulum position. The next month begins when the new moon is in conjunction with the next star or star system, in this case, Pleiades (a blue star cluster). This occurs 29.5 days after the start of the first month. However, the calendar runs out of day names a couple of days early. This is acceptable since the names of the days that started the month are also the names of the days that finish the month. This is the same for all the months, adjusted for the observations, of course, allowing a variation of a day or two here and there based on the astronomical observation. The third month starts when one spots the new moon rising "in conjunction with" the star Aldebaran. This continues down the list of six Borana star positions for the first six months.

== See also ==
- Namoratunga
