= Lapurr Sandstone =

Geological formation in Kenya

- Stratigraphic range: Campanian-Paleocene; ~72–65 Ma
- Type: Geological formation
- Underlies: Oligocene basalt
- Overlies: Precambrian metamorphic basement
- Thickness: 400–610 m (1,310–2,000 ft)

Lithology
- Primary: Sandstone

Location
- Coordinates: 4.3°N 35.8°E
- Approximate paleocoordinates: 13.8°S 27.8°E
- Region: Rift Valley Province
- Country: Kenya
- Extent: Turkana Basin, Great Rift Valley, Kenya

Type section
- Named for: Lake Turkana
- Lapurr Sandstone (Kenya)

The Lapurr Sandstone, also spelled Lapur Sandstone, previously considered part of the informal "Turkana Grits", is a geological formation in Kenya (Turkana County). It is the oldest unit in the Turkana Basin. The strata date back to the Late Cretaceous, likely Campanian to Maastrichtian, based on palynology and the presence of dyrosaurs and mosasaurs, the upper part of the unit likely extends into the Palaeogene, based on zircon dating. It predominantly consists of fine-coarse arkosic sandstone, which has been interpreted as either been deposited in fluvial or shallow marine conditions. Dinosaur remains among other vertebrates have been recovered from it around Lokitaung Gorge, though these mostly consist of heavily abraded, isolated bones of robust morphology like sauropod limb bones and caudal vertebrae.

== Vertebrate paleofauna ==
Dinosaurs
Taxa	Presence	Notes	Images
Sauropoda	Rift Valley Province, Kenya	At least 3 distinct taxa, at least some of which represents titanosaurs with affinities to Saltasauria, while others represent more basal Titanosauriformes Giant titanosaurs are also represented by dermal elements.	
Iguanodontia indet		Two distinct taxa	
?Ornithopoda indet.	Rift Valley Province, Kenya		
Abelisauridae	Rift Valley Province, Kenya	An unnamed giant abelisaurid, known from partial cranial and post cranial remains. Another smaller abelisaurid is also known.	
Theropoda indet		Distinct from the abelisaurid, suggested to be large in size.	

Other reptiles
Taxa	Presence	Notes	Images
Mosasauria indet		Caudal vertebra, initially misidentified as the vertebra of a pterosaur	
Neosuchia		Known from skull and lower jaw material showing large crushing teeth, initially misidentified as a spinosaur	
Dyrosauridae		Abundant remains	
Testudines			

== See also ==
- List of dinosaur-bearing rock formations
