= MRD-VP-1/1 =

Fossilized skull of Australopithecus anamensis found in Ethiopia

MRD
- Catalog no.: MRD-VP-1/1
- Common name: MRD
- Species: Australopithecus anamensis
- Age: 3.8 million years
- Place discovered: Woranso-Mille, Afar Region, Ethiopia
- Date discovered: February 10, 2016
- Discovered by: Ali Bereino

MRD-VP-1/1 is a fossilized cranium of the species Australopithecus anamensis. The first piece of MRD, the upper jaw, was found by Ali Bereino, a local Afar worker, on February 10, 2016, at Miro Dora, Mille district of the Afar Region, in present-day Ethiopia.

This first cranium of A. anamensis was identified by Yohannes Haile-Selassie of the Cleveland Museum of Natural History, Stephanie Melillo of the Max Planck Institute for Evolutionary Anthropology and their team members of the Woranso-Mille project in 2019. Prior to this, A. anamensis was known mainly from jaws and teeth.

Sedimentologist Beverly Saylor and her team members at Case Western Reserve University in Ohio dated the nearby minerals in layers of volcanic rock and determined the age of MRD as being around 3.8 million years old.

== Implications ==
According to the study, the MRD cranium and other fossils from the Afar, show that A. anamensis and A. afarensis co-existed for approximately 100,000 years.
