= Ian McDougall (geologist) =

Australian geologist and geochemist (1935–2018)

Ian McDougall (24 May 1935 – 10 November 2018) was an Australian geologist and geochemist.

McDougall was born in Hobart and studied at the University of Tasmania and Australian National University, before taking up a research position at ANU. He was a Fellow of the Geological Society of America, the Australian Academy of Science, and the American Geophysical Union. McDougall also served as Vice President of the International Association of Volcanology and Chemistry of the Earth's Interior.

McDougall's research areas included plate tectonics and geochronology. He has been described as "one of Australia's most internationally distinguished earth scientists," and was awarded the Centenary Medal in 2001.

McDougall died on 10 November 2018.
