= Lothagam North Pillar Site =

Archaeological site in Kenya

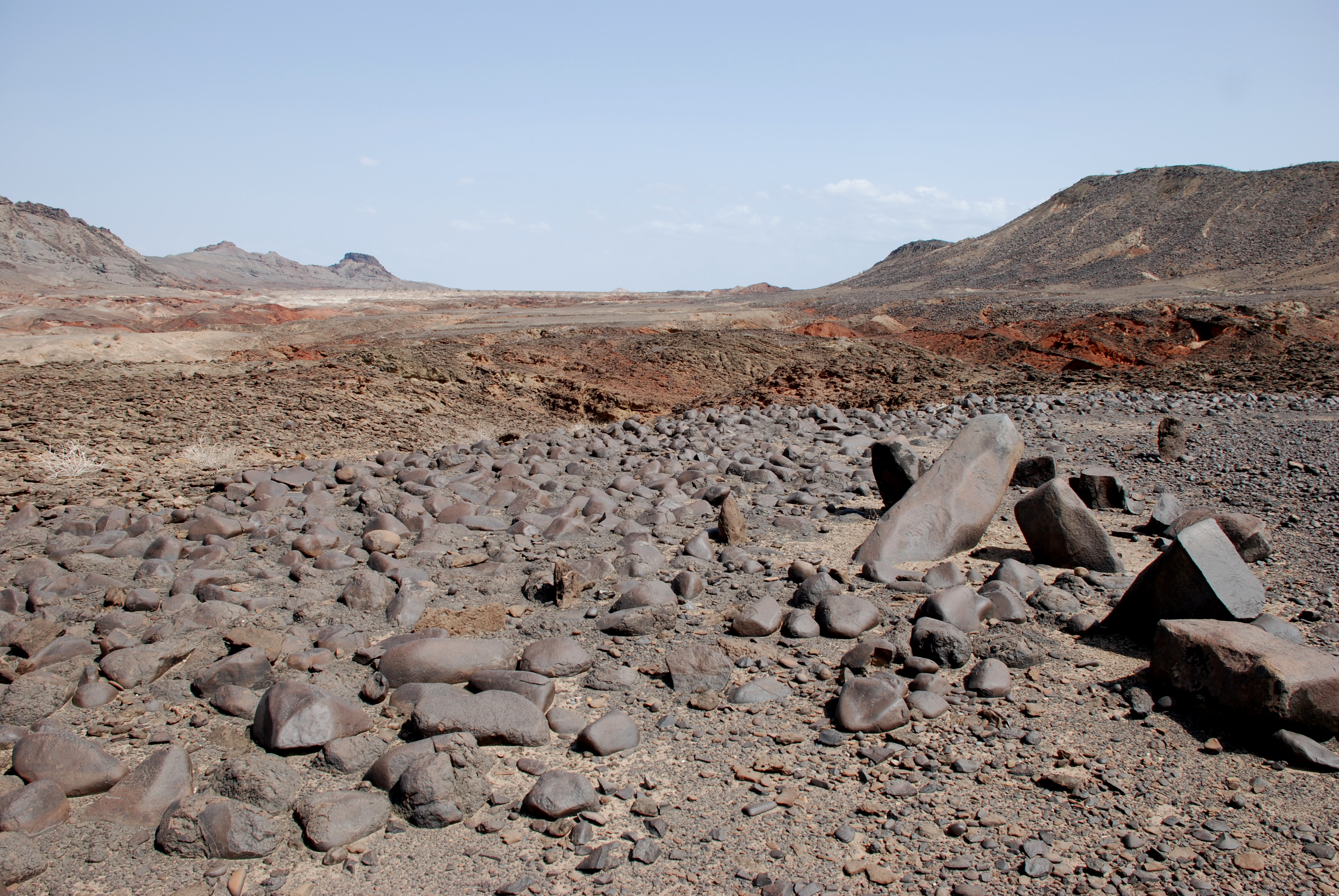
- Interactive map of Lothagam North Pillar Site
- Location: Turkana County, Kenya

The Lothagam North Pillar Site, registered as GeJi9, is an archaeological site at Lothagam on the west side of Lake Turkana in Kenya dating to the Pastoral Neolithic and the Holocene. It is a communal cemetery, built between 3000 BCE and 2300 BCE by the region's earliest herders as rainfall in the area decreased and Lake Turkana receded. It is thought to be eastern Africa's largest and earliest monumental cemetery.

The burial site study and excavation were led by Elisabeth Hildebrand from 2009 to 2014. The burial site is flanked by megaliths, stone circles, and cairns, and is believed to hold the remains of hundreds of individuals. Many of the people buried at Lothagam North were adorned with stone beads, ivory, animal teeth, rings, or other ornaments.

== Context ==
Between 12,000 and 5,000 years ago, tropical Africa experienced significant climate change resulting in increased humidity and a northward shift of vegetation zones and fauna. This time period is referred to as the African Humid Period, and during the Early and Middle Holocene, North and East Africa had a humid climate with full lakes and diverse water animals. The first herding economies emerged during this period, with sheep, goats, and cattle spreading rapidly through the Central Sahara and Nile Valley. As aridity increased in the Sahara Desert, specialized forms of pastoralism emerged and populations shifted out of the region.

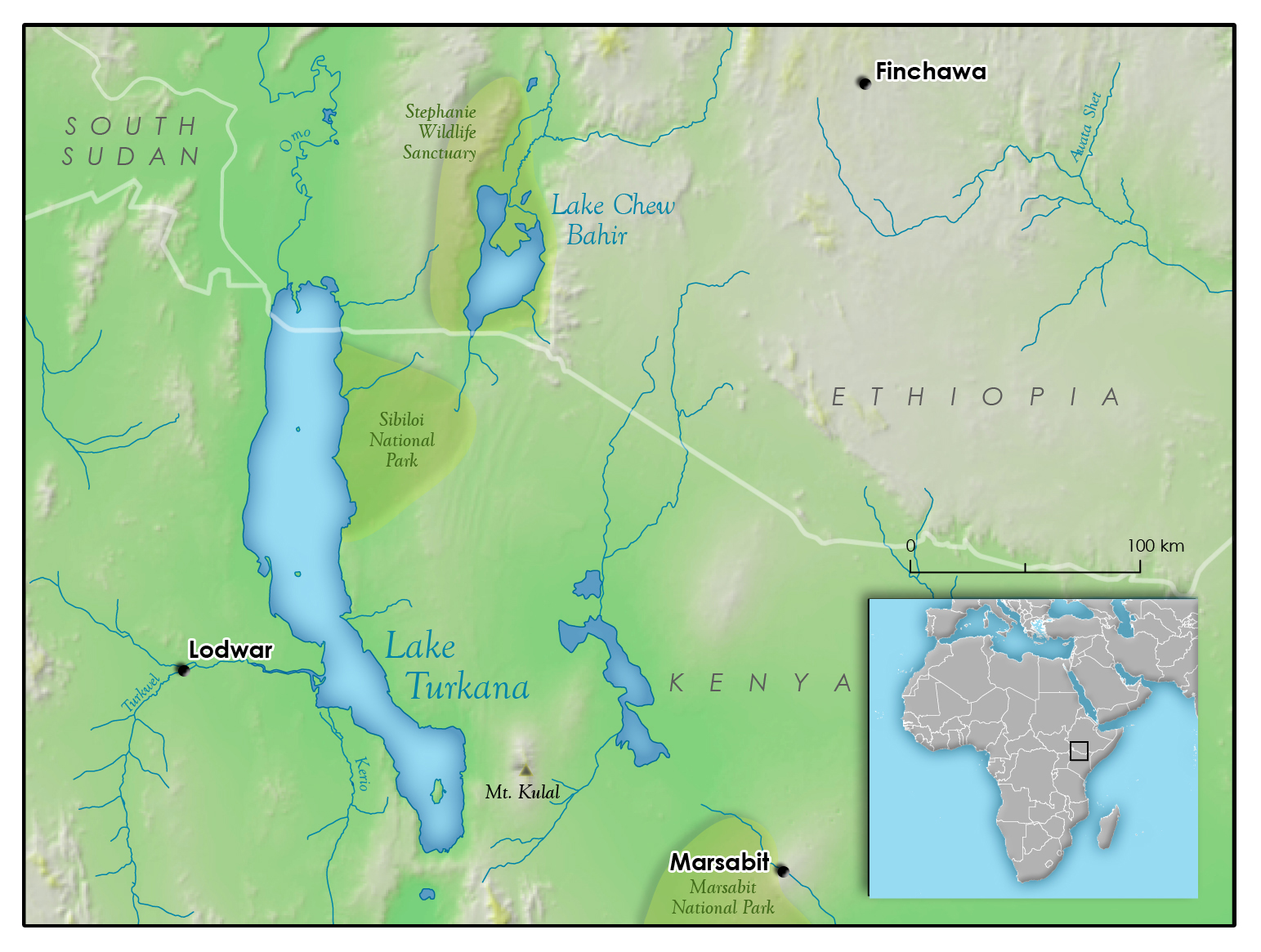
Location of the Lothagam North Pillar Site near Lake Turkana in Kenya

The Lothagam North Pillar Site, situated in the Lake Turkana Basin of East Africa, provides extensive evidence of Early and Middle Holocene pastoralism and adaptations. The site shows that people adjusted to various ways of living, including ceramic use and the hunting and gathering of aquatic resources, as well as relying on livestock and herding.

== History of occupation ==
During the African Humid Period, the Lothagam North Pillar Site displayed a unique and distinctive monumental tradition amongst significant environmental shifts. The changing climate caused the lake to recede revealing fertile land for herbivores to feed on, and people began to migrate into northwest Kenya, bringing cattle and herding practices. As people adapted to changes in the environment, they developed new technologies and social networks. However, around 3300 BCE, the African Humid Phase came to an end in the Turkana region, and the lake level dropped again. Towards the end of the African humid period, when drier conditions began, nomadic peoples of pastoralist hunter-gatherer communities would return to the site to bury their dead.

The construction and use of the site ended at the end of the humid period by 2300 BCE. The site is the oldest of six known pillar sites in the area and was in use for almost five hundred years. The architectural elements, such as cairns, stone circles, and platforms, indicate that the site was completed. The change in the climate or new diseases resulting in cattle losses may have forced the local inhabitants to move elsewhere. It is also possible that social changes and other factors played a role in the decrease in communal burial practices, as these customs were not observed in other herding populations in the Lake Turkana region.

== Excavation ==
The Lothagam North Pillar site situated in Kenya features two volcanic ridges oriented in a north-south direction and a trough between them containing deposits ranging from the Pliocene to the Holocene era. GeJi9 is located roughly 1 km northwest of early Holocene beach deposits and is separated into eastern and western sections. The western area is a circular platform supported by three pillars, while the eastern portion consists of six cairns and nine stone circles.

The platform surrounded by boulders on the western side of the Lothagam site covers an area of 700 square meters and contains a mortuary cavity, which is estimated to hold anywhere from 585 to 1,053 individuals. Recent research published in the Journal of Anthropological Archaeology has argued that the cemetery was for all members of this community, not just the leaders. The site yielded 30 excavated burials containing the remains of at least 44 individuals, including both males and females of different ages, and most of them were buried with ornaments. Data from excavations and ground-penetrating radar (GPR) reveal that the cemetery was a planned and multi-generational project. The mortuary cavity was built by removing beach sands from a large area down to sandstone bedrock. Each person was buried approximately 3 feet (0.91 m) deep in a smaller cavity. At the bottom of the mortuary cavity, pits with additional burials were carved into soft sandstone bedrock. The entire platform was then filled with rubble and capped with basalt pebbles, and natural basalt pillars were brought in and placed surrounding the platform’s east side.

On the eastern side, excavations occurred around one stone circle and one cairn. The largest cairn at Lothagam North, covering 57 square meters, is surrounded by massive sandstone slabs. The stone circle, a 16 square meter ring of sandstone and basalt cobble, covers a small, central bedrock pit containing remains and artifacts of at least three persons of distinct ages. The stone circle’s compact spacing and size are similar to the arrangement of burials and pits within the western platform.

== Archaeological finds ==
=== Human remains ===
Within Lothagam North’s platform on the western side, the mortuary cavity contains tightly arranged skeletal remains of all ages and sexes. Excavations of more than 44 individuals revealed that some of the burials were delayed, indicated by disorganized bones. Two-thirds of burials contained bent and folded individuals in various positions and were often capped with a sandstone or basalt boulder. On the edge of the cavity, excavation uncovered three skulls and dismembered body parts. The strategic placement of bodies allowed for maximum use of space, with variable body positions and orientations. Evidence shows that areas remained undisturbed after burial.

=== Ornamental remains ===
Nearly all skeletons found at the site were adorned with personal ornaments. These included ostrich eggshell or stone beads around the neck, ivory rings, pendants, earrings, and bangles. Two burials contained decorated headpieces adorned with intricate arrangements of mammal teeth. Another individual was buried with 12 perforated hippo tusks that may have represented jewelry of some sort. The burial pit yielded some caprine remains, as well as a carved stone palette that mimicked a cow. Adornments were found across all age groups and sexes, indicating that ornamentation was the norm. Over 300 vibrantly colored stones and minerals beads were found in 20 burials. The beads consisted of 36 raw materials, including soft materials such as pink analcime, dark green talc, and purple fluorite, and harder minerals such as bright blue-green amazonite and chalcedony. Many volcano-derived rocks, such as amygdaloidal and vesicular basalt, rhyolite, and phonolite, were found that are available locally, but other rocks like amazonite and talc only exist around other parts of the Turkana Basin, suggesting frequent travel to and from the site.

=== Ceramics ===
Classic Nderit rim sherd from the Lothagam North Pillar Site.

The GeJi9 ceramic assemblage was found to be from the middle Holocene times and includes 145 rim sherds from 99 vessels, with one of the vessels being gourd-shaped. Several vessels are complete, but 79 only consist of fragmented sherds. Most of the vessels are closed-mouth bowls that range from 5-22 cm in diameter, and some are decorated with grooves or incisions, Classic Nderit patterns, or burnished ripples. The vessels' paste contains volcanic material, and quartzose particles, and some vessels show faint amounts of mica. Although oxidation is usually incomplete, most sherds appear to be well-fired.

=== Lithics ===
The two excavation units at GeJi9 yielded a total of 258 lithic artifacts, mainly consisting of obsidian micro-debitage (small flakes less than 2 cm in size) which are similar to those found at the Jarigole pillar site, which is contemporenous to this site. Very few flakes have cortex on more than half of their surfaces, indicating that the raw material was brought from far away and that the cores were carefully selected. The six cores found are single-platform prismatic blade cores, and only one tool, identified as a scraper, was found.

=== Faunal remains ===
Very few faunal remains were found at the site. Ostrich eggshell beads and mammal bone fragments including teeth were found in the burials on the western side. The platform also contained remains of other mammals, caprine, and fish below the stone slabs, but no microfauna or birds.

== Discussions ==
=== Mortuary practices ===
Anthropologists’ interpretations of the mortuary practices at the Lothagam North Pillar Site have evolved over time. Early theories from a processual standpoint focus on social organization as the main factor, with the age, sex, and social status of the deceased accounting for the variation between individuals. Middle-range theorists emphasize functional explanations for mortuary behaviors, linking the establishment of cemeteries to territoriality and control over resources. Post-processual scholars take a more contextual approach, considering factors such as religious beliefs and physical circumstances surrounding death. Contemporary mortuary archaeologists use a mix of these theories, recognizing the complex social factors within material and cultural perspectives that shape funerary practices. While there is no universal explanation for the construction of the Lothagam North Pillar Site among early pastoralists and fisher hunter-gatherer communities, the presence of other pastoral cemeteries in mid-Holocene Africa suggests that mobile groups shared a similar social role within the spread of herding and social networking.

=== Abandonment ===
The reasons for the site’s abandonment remain unclear. However, in cases where pastoralism was introduced to a new area, cemetery creation often followed, particularly during major environmental shifts as seen in the Lothagam North Pillar Site. With unpredictable resource and trade distributions following the end of the African Humid Period, incoming herders faced challenges such as new landscapes, forage patterns, rainfall cycles, predators, diseases, and water sources. They may have also encountered diverse hunter-gatherer communities undergoing their own economic struggles due to changing environmental conditions.

The first herders in any area would have faced various challenges when adapting livestock strategies to new or changing environments, such as uncertain resources, unfamiliar weather patterns, and diverse hunter-gatherer communities. These challenges, combined with social tensions arising from interactions between different cultures and economies, may have led to the abandonment of the Lothagam North Pillar Site.

== Significance ==
The occupation of the Lothagam North Pillar Site and surrounding pillar sites in northwest Kenya were brief, and their absence in other areas suggests that they contributed to important social and economic transformation during their time period. At Lothagam North Pillar Site, a communal cemetery was constructed over a few centuries amidst all of the social and economic tensions of a dynamic landscape. The site may have served as a landmark for mobile people to express unity through shared ritual, promoting trade, information sharing, and strategic planning of livestock movements across multiple areas. The development of the site supports this idea, suggesting that monumentality helped lessen social and economic challenges.

Ethnographic and ethnohistoric accounts of eastern African herders and hunter-gatherers offer insights into the possible functions of pillar sites. They describe motivations for construction, including ceremonial, cultural, and religious practices that involved the establishment of social statuses and the gathering of mobile populations. Archaeologists can use this knowledge, even if the practices are different from the past, to test hypotheses about the uses of pillar sites.

The construction of monumental sites and mortuary customs indicate complex social forms that involve cooperative efforts of large groups to create reminders of shared history and cultural values. The Lothagam North Pillar Site provides insight into the social networks and cooperation of small-scale mobile societies without emerging social hierarchies, and researchers investigating pastoral frontiers in other parts of the world can use this data to consider a broad range of possible explanations for such sites. Furthermore, the archaeological record can enrich anthropological understanding of the strategies that led to pastoralist success, which can offer solutions to challenges that exist today, such as globalization, climate change, and urban development.

== See also ==
- Kalokol Pillar Site
- Manemanya Pillar Site
- Jarigole Pillar Site
