= Jarigole pillar site =

Communal cemetery in Lake Turkana Basin, Northern Kenya

The Jarigole pillar site is one of the megalithic communal cemetery sites in Lake Turkana Basin in Northern Kenya associated with the Pastoral Neolithic period. The site is located on the eastern shores of Lake Turkana in the southeastern edge of the Sibiloi National Park. Situated in a recessional beach which is 70 m (230 ft) above the 1973 lake level, the site includes oval platforms >1,000 m^{2} (11,000 sq ft) with a circular mound (120 m^{3} (4,200 cu ft) of sediments), and 28 basalt pillars each weighing about 200 kg (440 lb) and moved over a distance of 2 km (1.2 mi) from the site. The site is believed to have been constructed by the first wave of ancient herders who migrated to the region down from the Sahara around 5,000 years ago, a period marked by rapid climatic, economic and social change.

Radiocarbon dates suggest that the site was used over a relatively short period of time from 4940 to 4630 BP. However, the accuracy of these dates are contestable owing to the fact the dateable materials, which includes Ostrich Egg Shell (OES) beads and charcoal does not provide the exact date of deposition, which are the main limitations of these materials.

== History of excavations and findings ==
The site was first excavated by Merrick and Nelson in the 1980s, as part of the Koobi Fora field school program which ran between 1986-1996. Based on these studies, only one primary burial was found while a majority of the finds included secondary burials. As a result, a single "Jarigole mortuary tradition" was proposed, meaning that the site was primarily used for secondary interments which were defleshed and disarticulated before they were brought to the site for final burial. In addition to the human burials, the site yielded other material cultures including ornaments made of stone beads Ostrich Egg Shells (OES) beads, and ear spools made of ivory, lithics, anthropomorphic figurines, and a distinctive pottery with wavy line decorations, later known as Nderit ware. Preliminary reports also suggested the presence of marine shells Strigatella paupercula, pointing to the wide trade network and contact between the site and the Indian Ocean.

Recent excavations conducted under the auspices of the Later Prehistory of West Turkana (LPWT) project revealed a total of six primary burials which included nine individuals buried in different orientations and material culture. Of these burials, only one (Burial 5) contained 3 commingled and disarticulated individuals, while the rest had individual interments. One individual was found buried with OES bead bracelet (Burial 6), while another individual (Burial 4) was found buried with a necklace made of 100 amazonite beads and other stone beads, a phallus-shaped ceramic, and an animal figurine, which are only unique to this site. Other ornamentations included over 4,000 OES beads that were unrelated to any particular individual but scattered with the burials were also recovered. Zoomorphic ceramic figurines discovered at the site represent various animals including a honey badger, leopard, giraffe, hippopotamus, elephant, and cattle. A new type of pottery known as Nderit pottery, which includes varied decorative styles but manufactured using the same technique was also found in Dongodien: one the Pastoral Neolithic habitation sites located on the eastern shores of Lake Turkana. In addition, lithics which mainly constituted obsidian (72-92%) were discovered at the site, were manufactured using the same techniques as obsidian found in Dongodien, Lothagam North and Manemanya, while other materials were not made with the same level of precision.

== Interpretations ==
Based on the presence of primary burials, the earlier interpretation of the presence of a single "Jarigole Mortuary tradition" was overturned. In addition, the recent studies on the sourcing on mineralogy of the stone beads found on the site, has also proved that the materials were locally sourced, therefore disproving the long-distance trade networks theory as earlier suggested by Nelson

The diversity of styles and decorations on the Nderit pottery in Jarigole and other pillar sites, including Lothagam North, suggests a more variable and complex history of ceramics production and use than previously known. Found to be only localized in the Pastoral Neolithic pillar sites in Turkana basin before its southwards spread into the Rift Valley, the Nderit pottery seems to suggest that they played a central in fostering cohesion and collective actions amongst ancient herders who constructed and used the pillar sites for various purposes. The presence of sherd has been earlier hypothesized as being deliberately broken either on site or in actions accompanying the body from primary to secondary burials. Recent findings of deliberately drilled and broken pots at Lothagam North support this idea. Obsidian stone tools associated with early herders also suggested a shared distinct tradition across Lothagam North, Manemanya, and Dongodien. Recent studies on the sourcing of obsidian indicate that they were originally sourced from the Northern island of Lake Turkana and moved through existing trade networks that were possibly facilitated by the use of boats However, due to the differences in architectural and artefactual depositions especially among the contemporaneous pillar sites including Jarigole and Lothagam North seems also to suggest that they might have been used at different time, for different purposes and possibly by different groups.

Overall, the presence of six other pillar sites, including Jarigole, has been interpreted as indicators of social complexity and as proof of communal commemoration of shared belief, especially in the context of the rapid environmental, social, and economic that characterized by the African Humid Period (AHP). The lack of clear evidence of social stratification also supports this argument. As a result, these pillars have been conceptualized as one of the ways the herders buffered risks by creating strong social networks. The construction and use of the pillar sites are believed to have been abandoned following the onset of the "static frontiers," where it is suggested that groups might have developed reifying institutions like age-sets and gerontocracy systems ubiquitous among present-day pastoralists in Africa.
