= Nderit pottery =

Ceramics from some African archaeological sites

"Classic Nderit" rim sherd from Lothagam North Pillar Site, northwestern Kenya. Top image is exterior surface, bottom image is interior surface. Photographed during research by the Later Prehistory of West Turkana Project (LPWT)

Nderit pottery is a type of ceramic vessel found at archaeological sites in Africa, particularly Tanzania and Kenya. Nderit pottery, previously known as ceramic tradition "Gumban A ware," was initially documented by Louis Leakey in the 1930s at sites in the Central Rift Valley of Kenya.Stylistic characteristics of Nderit pottery discovered in the Central Rift Valley include an exterior decoration of basket-like and triangular markings into the clay’s surface. The vessels here also have intensely scored interiors that do not appear to follow a distinct pattern. Nderit Ware exemplifies the transition from Saharan wavy-line early Holocene pottery towards the basket-like designs of the middle Holocene. Lipid residue found on Nderit pottery can be used to analyze the food products stored in them by early pastoralist societies.

== Characteristics ==
=== Composition ===
Majority of Nderit vessels' paste type composition is gritty, well-sorted, and includes medium-to-coarse sized sand. At the Jarigole archaeological site, evidence was found of a softer paste type as well. The sand temper used in producing Nderit Pottery has significant mineralogical diversity. Nderit ceramics found near Lake Turkana commonly have gray cores, which is characteristic of reduced-oxygen firing techniques.

=== Vessel forms ===
Nderit pottery includes a wide variety of vessel forms, such as bowls, platters, jars, and bottles. Twenty different forms of Nderit vessels were found at the Jarigole Pillar Site.

=== Stylistic attributes ===
Classic Nderit vessels' exteriors are often covered in basketry-like impressions. Incised and grooved patterns on the exteriors of Nderit pottery were found on majority of vessels found at Jarigole Pillar Site. Burnished ripple patterns on the exteriors of some Nderit pottery are similar to the wavy-lined pottery and rippled pottery in northeastern Africa's Nile Valley. Nderit pottery has also been found with red slip covering vessels. Channeled Ground Nderit ceramics exhibit repetitive impressions across the exterior of the vessels. These impressions are divided by deeper channels dug across the exterior pattern. Many vessels also contain internal scoring.

== Archaeological sites ==
Burial sites where Nderit pottery was unearthed by Louis Leakey include Hyrax Hill, Stable’s Drift, and Makalia Burial Site. Leakey's pottery sherds were reconstructed to complete three pots. Another site containing Nderit pottery was found by John Bartheleme and is located east of Lake Turkana. Lawrence H. Robbins' discoveries within the Turkana District of Kenya, detailed in 1972, display pottery sherds with Nderit pottery’s distinct internal scoring and basket-like exteriors. Robbins’ Nderit artifacts span throughout the lower Turkwel and Kerio river valleys. Nderit pottery with surrounding lake sediment that could be dated back to 4800 years ago was found at Kangatotha, a site near Turkwel. Within the Jarigole archeological site, which was a communal cemetery near Lake Turkana, highly decorated Nderit pottery was unearthed with diverse items for personal ornamentation. A multitude of the ceramics found at Jarigole had exteriors decorated with the basket-like impressions along with others adorned with ripple and geometric impressions. Another site containing Nderit ceramics and sherds is Dongodien, which lies north of the Jarigole site. The sherds unearthed at Dongodien also contain lipid-bearing residues. Burnished Ripple Nderit pottery has been found at the Lothagam North Pillar Site and the Jarigole Pillar Site.

== Chronology ==
Sites where Nderit pottery has been found are radiocarbon dated through materials such as charcoal, ostrich eggshell (OES), ceramic, and human bone. One of the earliest dated sites containing Nderit pottery is from the Turkana Basin's Jarigole Pillar Site which has OES beads dating at approximately 5045-4840 years before present (BP). The Lothagam North Pillar Site containing Nderit pottery has charcoal dating approximately 4865-4720 BP. The Dongodien site in the Turkana Basin has charcoal dating to approximately 4835-4530 BP.

== Cultural associations ==
In the Makalia Burial Site, three semi-crouched skeletons were discovered along with Nderit sherds, stone bowl shards, and obsidian tools. Hyrax Hill contained approximately 19 human skeletons within a communal cemetery buried with stone platters and about 1350 ceramic sherds.

== Residue analyses ==
By using chemical and isotopic analyses, lipid residues were discovered on Nderit ceramics from two archaeological sites in northern Kenya, Jarigole and Dongodien. Sherds found at these sites, as well as on other Pastoral Neolithic ceramic types from sites farther south, contain the earliest evidence for the processing of dairy, meat, and plants by Pastoral Neolithic societies in eastern Africa.
