= Lothagam =

Geological formation in Kenya

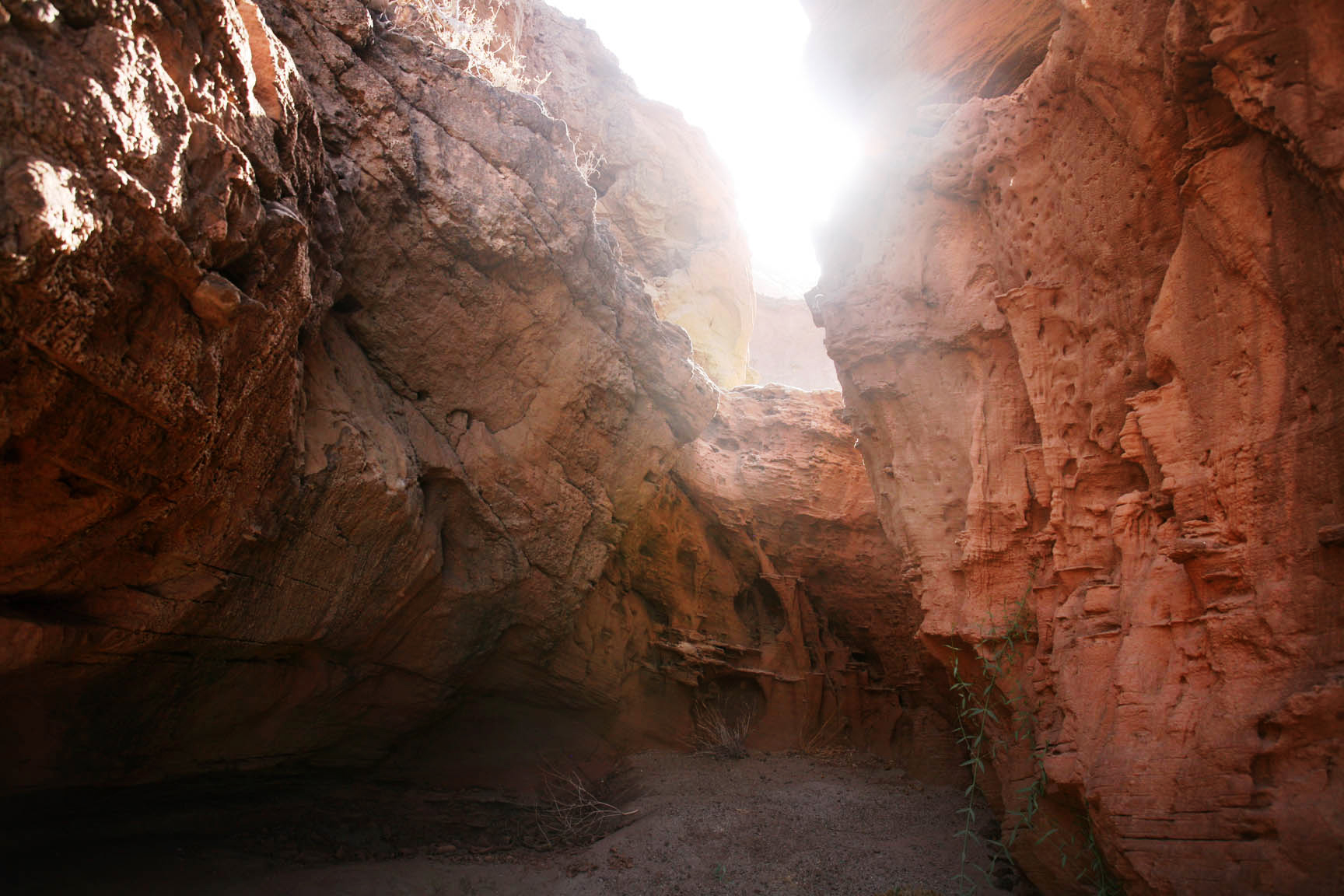
Cavern at Lothagam paleontological site in Turkana, Kenya

Lothagam is a geological formation located in Kenya, near the southwestern shores of Lake Turkana, 55 km (34 mi) from Kanapoi. It is located between the Kerio and Lomunyenkuparet Rivers on an uplifted fault block.

== Archaeology ==
Bryan Patterson from Harvard University was, in 1967, the first to carry out paleontological research at Lothagam. Meave Leakey has also carried out extensive paleontological research at Lothagam.

=== Miocene and Pliocene ===
Miocene-Pliocene deposits and numerous palaeontological finds have been found at Lothagam.

=== Holocene ===
Archaeological sites dating to the Holocene have been found at Lothagam, including the Lothagam Lokam harpoon site and the Lothagam North Pillar Site.

== See also ==
- List of fossil sites
