= Turkana Basin =

Large endorheic basin mainly in Kenya and Ethiopia

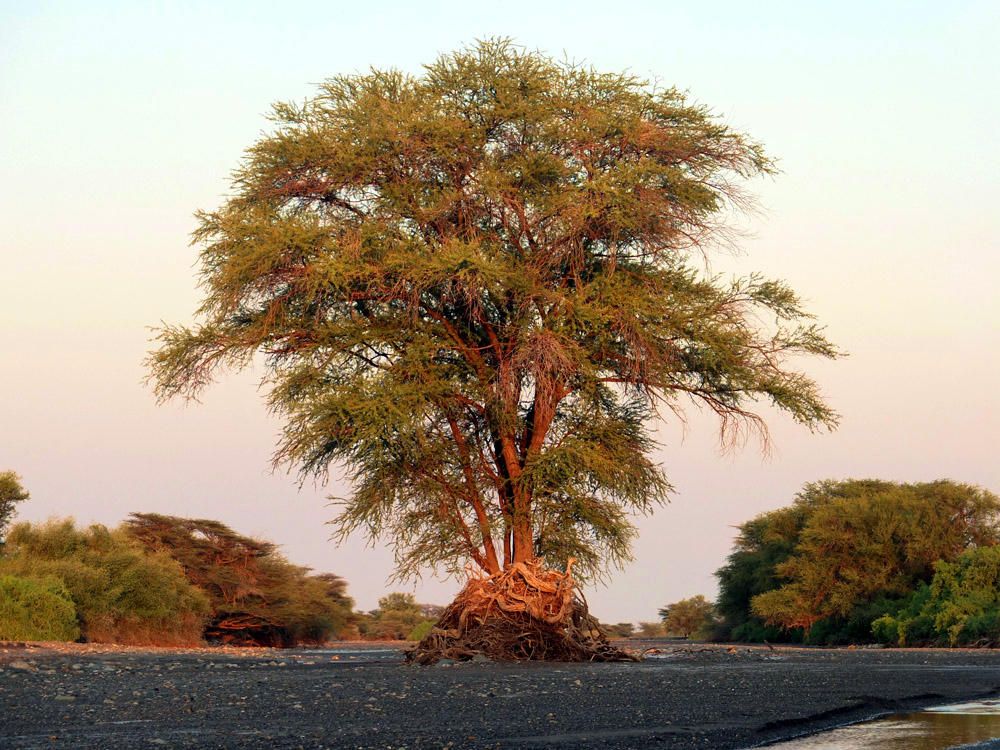
An Acacia tree in the Kokiselei river, northern Kenya

The greater Turkana Basin in East Africa (mainly northwestern Kenya and southern Ethiopia, smaller parts of eastern Uganda and southeastern South Sudan) determines a large endorheic basin, a drainage basin with no outflow centered around the north-southwards directed Gregory Rift system in Kenya and southern Ethiopia. The deepest point of the basin is the endorheic Lake Turkana, a brackish soda lake with a very high ecological productivity in the Gregory Rift.

A narrower definition for the term Turkana Basin is also in widespread use and includes Lake Turkana and its environment within the confines of the Gregory Rift in Kenya and Ethiopia, as well as the lower Omo River valley in Ethiopia. The Basin in the narrower definition is a site of geological subsidence containing one of the most continuous and temporally well controlled fossil records of the Plio-Pleistocene with some fossils as old as the Cretaceous. Among the Basin's critical fossiliferous sites are Lothagam, Allia Bay, and Koobi Fora.

== Geography ==
Lake Turkana sits at the center of the Turkana Basin and is flanked by the Chalbi Desert to the east, the Lotakipi Plains to the north, Karasuk to the west and Samburu to the south. Included within these regions are desert scrub, desert grass and shrubland, and scattered acacia or open grasslands. The only true perennial river is the Omo River in Ethiopia, in the northern part of the basin, which discharges into the lake on its northern shore and supplies the lake with more than 98% of its annual water inflow. The two intermittent rivers – which almost alone contribute the remaining 2% of water inflow – are the Turkwel River and the Kerio River in Kenya, in the western part of the basin. Much of the Turkana Basin today can be described as arid scrubland or even desert. The exception is the Omo-Gibe River valley to the north.

Important towns within the Turkana Basin include Lokitaung, Kakuma, Lodwar, Lorogumu, Ileret and Kargi. The Turkana people inhabit the west of the Basin, the Samburu and Pokot people inhabit the south, and the Nyangatom, Daasanach and Borana Oromo peoples inhabit the north and east.

== Geological setting ==
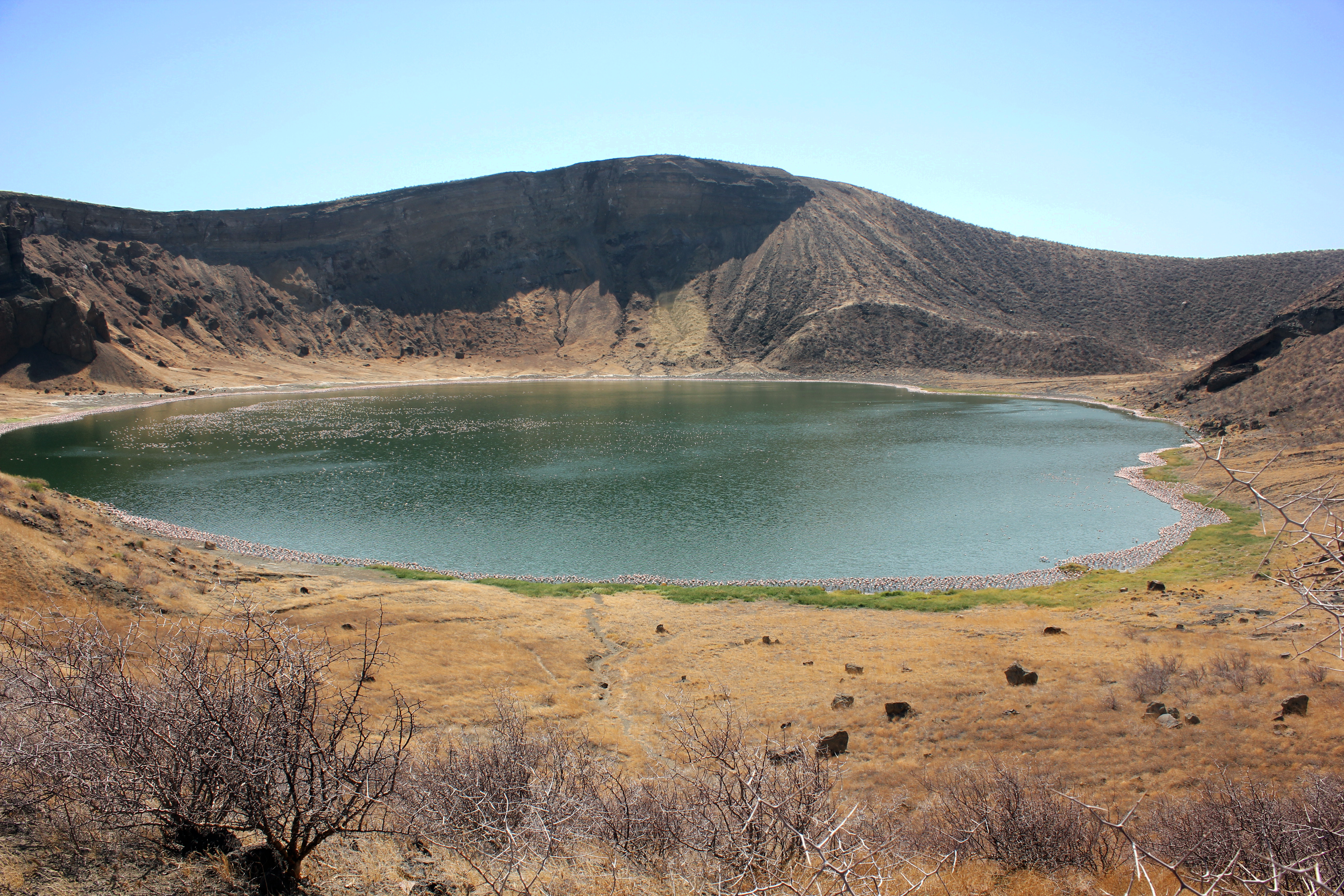
Flamingo Lake on Central Island in Lake Turkana

The oldest sedimentary records go back to the Cretaceous, including units previously informally referred to as the Turkana grits like the Lapurr Sandstone and are dominated by eastward flowing fluvial sequences draining into the Indian Ocean; later formations from the Oligocene and Miocene are characterised by similar fluvial regimes that are not however unified under a single geological group or system. Approximately 4.2 million years ago (Ma), the region experienced widespread and significant volcanism, associated with the Gombe basalts in the Koobi Fora formation to the east and with the Lothagam basalts further south; this event created a lake in the center of the basin and apparently established the modern, continuous depositional system of the Turkana Basin.

Deposition in the Turkana Basin overall is driven primarily by subsidence, a result of rifting between the Somali and Nubian plates that has created a series of horst and graben structures, and led to approximately 1 km of sedimentary deposits at the center of the basin every 1 million years. Sedimentary records, which become more sparse and discontinuous at greater distance from the basin center, suggest that the basin has alternated between fluvial and lacustrine regimes throughout the Plio-Pleistocene, primarily as a result of continued volcanic activity first to the east, and later to the south of the basin.

== Evolutionary record ==
Fossil records in the basin help establish much of what is known about African faunal evolution in the Neogene and Quaternary. As in other regions, the end-Miocene Messinian aridification crisis and global cooling trend seem to have influenced fossil assemblages in the Turkana Basin, either through migrations or de novo evolutionary events. Fossilized leaves characteristic of more mesic landscapes, faunal community compositions, and increase "C4" or arid-adapted plant contribution to herbivore carbon intake, all suggest that the Miocene world was more lush than the Pliocene. Some herbivores, like horses, responded rapidly to the spread of C4 grasslands, while other herbivores evolved more slowly, or developed a number of different responses to an increasingly arid landscape.

Evolutionary studies of the Turkana Basin have found what may be major intervals of faunal turnover after the Miocene as well, most notably in the late Pliocene and early Pleistocene, though later studies have suggested more gradual changes in herbivore community composition throughout this interval. One cause of focus on the late Pliocene and early Pleistocene is the large literature on hominin fossil remains showing an apparent "adaptive radiation" across this boundary. While previous hominin species are considered to be part of a single, continuously evolving "anagenetic" lineage, hominin fossil remains become extraordinarily diverse in East Africa 2.5 million years ago, with numerous species of robust australopithecine and early human ancestors found first in the Turkana Basin, and ultimately in South Africa as well. The earliest putative evidence for stone tool use among human ancestors is found within the Turkana Basin.

== See also ==
- Lake Turkana
- Koobi Fora
- Lothagam
- List of fossil sites
- List of human evolution fossils
- Turkana people
